= List of educational institutions in Abbottabad =

Abbottabad is a military garrison town in the hills of the Hazara region in the Khyber Pakhtunkhwa province of Pakistan. It has a number of universities, colleges and schools, as well as other educational and vocational institutions.

The most prominent of them are Army Burn Hall College, Abbottabad Public School, Army Public College, Pasban-E-Wattan School & College, Mandian Abbottabad and Roots Millennium Schools and Roots School System also widely known as Roots International.

== List of educational institutions in Abbottabad ==
This is a list of educational institutions in the Abbottabad District.

- The Alpha Centauri Schools (Nawanshehr Campus) Abbottabad
- The Alpha Centauri Schools (Islamkot Campus) Abbottabad
- Shama Public School and College (SPSC) Abbottabad – Nawanshehr - [Pre Nursery till FSc]
- Pasban-E-Wattan School & College, Mandian Abbottabad
- The Move Montessori & School Muree Road Abbottabad.
- Abbottabad School & College of Sciences Abbottabad
- Abbottabad Public School (APS)
- Al-Imtiaz Academy
- Al-Noor Academic System (ALNAS) (Hasan Town - P.M.A Road)
- Aligarh Public School & College
- Army Burn Hall College (ABHC)
- Army Public College Kakul Campus (APC)
- Army Public School And College Section, FF centre (APSACS)
- Aspire Schools Abbottabad
- Awaisia Puplic School, Nawansher, Abbottabad
- Banat Public School & Girls College
- Beaconhouse Hassan Town
- Beaconhouse Liaquat Road
- Bloom Hall Public School
- Bright Hall Education System Abbottabad
- The City School Abbottabad
- Comwave Institute Of Science & Information Technology
- Concept School of Learning
- Creations – Academy of Fine Arts Abbottabad
- The Creators School & College of Science and Commerce Abbottabad
- The Educators School
- Abbasi public school and college Abbottabad hazara kp pak

Fauji Foundation Model School Abbottabad

- The First Frontier School & College (FFNS)
- Gandhara Public School
- Government Commerce College & Management Abbottabad (GCMS)
- Government Girls' College#1 Abbottabad
- Government Girls' College#2 Abbottabad
- Government Girls' High School#1 Abbottabad
- Government Girls' High School#2 Abbottabad
- Government Girls' Higher Secondary School Comprehensive Abbottabad
- Government High School#1 Abbottabad
- Government High School#2 Abbottabad
- Government High School#3 Abbottabad
- Government High School#4 Abbottabad
- Green Valley Public High School – P.M.A. Road, Abbottabad
- Hazara Hills Academy – Abbottabad
- Iqra Academy Abbottabad
- Kingston School For Mentally Retarded Children Kehal Abbottabad
- Kingston School For Learning Disabilities, Abbottabad
- Kingston School for Autism Children Abbottabad
- Kingston School for Special Needs Children Abbottabad
- Lime Light Public School
- Leaps Grammar School Narrian Campus
- Mangal Public School
- Modern School System
- Modern Age Public School
- The Muslim Education System
- Nakhlah Academy
- The Nice School and College
- Nishtar Public School, Nawanshehr
- Pakistan International Public School and College (PIPS)
- Pakistan Public Academy – Chinar Road, Abbottabad
- Pine Hills Public School
- Present Times Public School
- Progressive College of Sciences
- Red Roses Islamic Academy – Gulshan Iqbal Jhangi
- Rahber Public School
- Shama Public High School Abbottabad – Nawanshehr
- Sikandria Public School – near Ilyasi Masjid Nawanshehr Choonakari
- Peace Public School
- Urban School & College Abbottabad
- Vertex School System Abbottabad
- Zawiya International Public School
- Siddique Public School Narrian Abbottabad.

== Post-secondary schools ==
- Abbottabad University of Science and Technology
- Army Burn Hall College (ABHC)
- Ayub Medical College
  - Ayub Teaching Hospital
  - Ayub School of Nursing
  - Ayub College of Dentistry
  - Institute of Nuclear Medicine, Oncology and Radiotherapy
- COMSATS Abbottabad
- Emerson College of Technology
- Emerson Degree College of Commerce and Management
- Frontier Medical College
- Gate Way School and College, Abbottabad
- Government College Abbottabad for Boys
- Government College of Management Sciences Abbottabad
- Government College of Technology Abbottabad
- Government Post Graduate College, Abbottabad
- Government Post Graduate College Mandian, Abbottabad
- Institute of Cost & Management Accountants of Pakistan (ICMAP)
- Kingston School for Deaf & Hearing Impaired Children – Kehal, Abbottabad
- Kingston School for Mentally Retarded Children – Kehal, Abbottabad
- Kingston School for Physically Challenged & Visual Challenged Children – Kehal, Abbottabad
- Mishwani's College of Commerce & Accountancy (MCCA) – D.Com., DBA, B.Com. & M. Com; affiliated with the University of Peshawar
- Muslim College of Management Sciences Abbottabad
- NIMS College of Medicine – pending approval for recognition from CJ SC following corruption allegations against PMDC officials
- Oregon Institute of Education Abbottabad
- Peace Group Of Colleges Abbottabad
- Punjab Group of Colleges, Abbottabad
- University of Engineering and Technology, Peshawar, Abbottabad campus
- University of Science and Technology Abbottabad
- Women Medical College – Awami Road, Nawanshehr

=== Military schools ===
- Army Physical Training School
- Army School of Music
- Pakistan Military Academy
- Regimental Training Centers of the Pakistan Army
  - Army Medical Corps (AMC)
  - Baloch Regiment (BR)
  - Frontier Force Regiment (PIFFERS)

== See also ==
- Education in Pakistan
- List of schools in Pakistan
