= 2012 Khyber Agency bombing =

2012 terror attack in northwest Pakistan

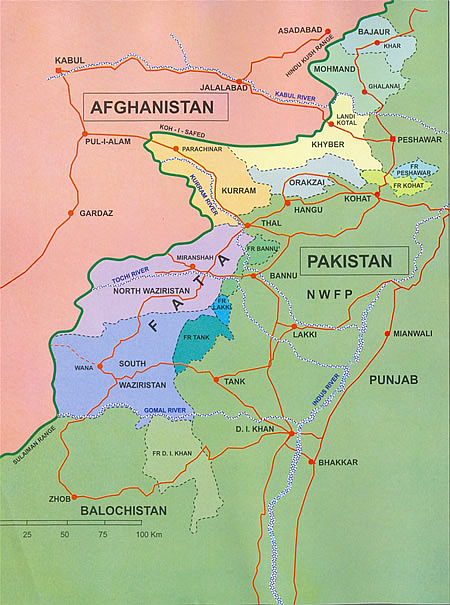
- Map of the Federally Administered Tribal Areas. The Khyber Agency is located in the north (in light yellow). Click to enlarge
- Location: Jamrud, Khyber Agency, FATA, Pakistan
- Date: 10 January 2012
- Deaths: 30
- Injuries: 78

The 2012 Khyber Agency bombing occurred on 10 January 2012, when a bomb exploded near a petrol pump in the town of Jamrud near the Afghan border in Khyber Agency of the Federally Administered Tribal Areas (FATA) of Pakistan. The bombing killed at least 30 people while 78 others were injured.

== Background ==
The Khyber Agency market bombing was recorded to be the first major terrorist attack in the country since September 2011 when a Taliban suicide bomber had killed 46 people at a funeral in Lower Dir, targeting anti-Taliban militia members. Khyber Agency has experienced heavy conflict due to constant cross-border movement of militants connected to the War in Afghanistan. It used to serve as the main NATO supply route to Afghanistan until the closure of all supply lines by Pakistan in the wake of a NATO-led attack on Pakistani military checkposts which resulted in the death of 24 Pakistani soldiers.

== Attack ==
According to official sources, the remote-controlled device had been planted in a passenger pick-up van at a fuel station in the town near a vegetable market (bazaar). A local government administrator said the bombing may have been a reaction to a successful military operation underway in Khyber Agency against insurgents and that the possible target of the attack may have been people of the Zakhakhel tribe who had formed a lashkar (armed militia) against Tehrik-i-Taliban militants. The bombing had hallmarks similar to earlier attacks carried out by insurgent groups.

The injured were transported by ambulances to the Hayatabad Medical Complex, Khyber Teaching Hospital and Lady Reading Hospital in Peshawar. The area was cordoned off by security agencies for investigation following the explosion. Funeral prayers were held for the dead soon after the attack. The authorities announced Rs. 100,000 compensation for the family of each deceased and Rs. 25,000 for each injured person.

== Responsibility ==
A Taliban spokesman speaking via telephone from an undisclosed location denied that the Taliban had a role in the attack. Taliban spokesperson Ehsanullah Ehsan also disowned the attack in an email sent to the media. Local residents claimed that the nature of the bombing suggested that it was related more to a tribal dispute, since most of the victims of the blast were members of a tribe who opposed the notorious local warlord Mangal Bagh.

== Reactions ==
=== Domestic ===
- President Asif Ali Zardari and Prime Minister Yousaf Raza Gillani condemned the blast and expressed grief over the loss of lives.
- Chief Minister of Khyber Pakhtunkhwa Amir Haider Khan Hoti condemned the incident while Masood Kausar, the Governor of Khyber Pakhtunkhwa, also condemned the blast and called it an inhuman act in which innocent people were targeted. Kausar visited injured victims at a hospital.
- Shahbaz Sharif, the Chief Minister of Punjab gave his condemnations on the attack.
- Imran Khan, leader of the Pakistan Tehreek-e-Insaf (PTI) political party condemned the bombing and criticised the government, stating that the ignorance in maintaining rule of law by the country's leaders created a culture in which "the weak and the underprivileged become victims." He added that if the PTI came into power, it would not spare those who violated law.

=== International ===
- United Nations: UN Secretary-General Ban Ki-moon condemned the bombing and issued his "heartfelt condolences and sympathy to the families of the victims and reiterates the continued solidarity of the United Nations with the people and government of Pakistan in their continuing efforts to confront terrorism and extremism."
- United States: In a statement, U.S. State Department spokesperson Victoria Nuland said the United States condemned the marketplace bombing and offered condolences for the dead victims: "By callously targeting innocent peoples, the extremists who planned and perpetrated this attack are just showing their contempt for the value of human life." The U.S. embassy in Islamabad also released a press statement condemning the blast.

== See also ==
- Terrorist incidents in Pakistan in 2012
- 2011 Khyber Agency bombing
