= Government Post Graduate College =

Government Post Graduate College may refer to:

== India ==
- Government Post Graduate College in Gopeshwar, Chamoli, Uttarakhand
- Guru Gorakhnath Govt. Post Graduate College, Hisar, Haryana
- Government Post Graduate College Noida, Uttar Pradesh
- Govt. PG College Rampur Bushahr, Himachal Pradesh
- Post Graduate Government College, Sector 11, Chandigarh
- Post Graduate College, Ghazipur, Uttar Pradesh

== Pakistan ==
Punjab

- Government Post Graduate College (Chakwal)
- Government Post Graduate College (Jhang)
- Government Postgraduate College Sahiwal
- Government Post Graduate College Shakargarh

Khyber Pakhtunkhwa

- Government Post Graduate College, Abbottabad
- Government Post Graduate College Bannu
- Government Post Graduate College Karak
- Government Post Graduate College Lakki Marwat
- Government Post Graduate College Mandian, Abbottabad
- Government Post Graduate College, Mansehra
- Government Post Graduate College Mardan
- Government Post Graduate College Nowshera
- Government Post Graduate College, Swabi

== See also ==
- Graduate College (disambiguation)
