= Ayub Medical Complex =

Ayub Medical Complex may refer to:

- Ayub Teaching Hospital
- Ayub Medical College
- Institute of Nuclear Medicine, Oncology and Radiotherapy
