= KIMS =

KIMS may refer to:

- Kinetic interaction of microparticle in solution, a biochemical test
- Korea Invisible Mass Search, a Korean physicist collaboration in the search of dark matter
- Madison Municipal Airport (Indiana) in Madison, Indiana

== Institutes of Medical Sciences ==
- Kalinga Institute of Medical Sciences, the medical school of KIIT University, Bhubaneswar, Orissa, India
- Karnataka Institute of Medical Sciences, a government medical college in Hubli, Karnataka, India
- Kempegowda Institute of Medical Sciences, a college giving education in medicine in Bangalore, India
- Kerala Institute of Medical Sciences, a healthcare organization headquartered in Trivandrum, India
- KIMS Hospital, Maidstone, England
- KMU Institute of Medical Sciences, Khyber Medical University, Peshawar, Pakistan
- Koppal Institute of Medical Sciences, a government medical college established in 2015 in Koppal, Karnataka, India
- Krishna Institute of Medical Sciences (hospital group), an Indian hospital chain based in Andhra Pradesh and Telangana, India

== See also ==
- Kim (disambiguation)
