= 2011 Khyber Agency bombing =

Terrorist incident in Pakistan

August 2011 Khyber Agency bombing
- Location: Jamrud, Ghundai, Khyber Agency, FATA, Pakistan
- Date: 19 August 2011
- Attack type: Suicide bombing
- Deaths: 48+
- Injuries: 100+

The August 2011 Khyber Agency bombing occurred on 19 August 2011 in Jamrud, Ghundai within the Khyber Agency of FATA, Pakistan. At least 48 people were reported to have died after a suicide bomber exploded his vest at a mosque during Friday prayers in the month of Ramadan when about 300-500 people were praying; at least 40 others were also wounded.

== Background ==
Pakistan has faced a renewed insurgency since the death of Osama bin Laden in April 2011, including bold attacks against military targets and the destruction of naval aircraft.

On the same day of the attacks, the United States of America's Central Intelligence Agency's drones killed four people said to be "militants" in the wider tribal area.

== Attack ==
A suicide bomber who was said to have been a teenage boy exploded his vest at a mosque in the Ghundai area of Khyber Agency. The mosque was in an area inhabited by Kokikhel tribes who have been opposed to the Taliban activities and have fought to expel them from the region. Mutahir Zeb, a regional government administrator, said that the attack could have been in retaliation and that "many of the wounded succumbed to their injuries, adding to the toll that may rise further as there are still people in critical condition." Khalid Mumtaz Kundi, the deputy chief of the district administration, said that the suicide bomber was wearing 8–10 kg of explosives and was on foot when he exploded his vest in the prayer hall; he also said that ball bearings were used in the attack. According to Al Jazeera the whole mosque compound collapsed with many more worshippers buried under the rubble.

The wounded were taken via ambulances for treatment to the Khyber Teaching Hospital, Hayatabad Medical Complex and the Lady Reading Hospital in Peshawar.

== Responsibility ==
Though no one laid claim to the attack, the Pakistani Taliban were suspected. According to Al Jazeera however, Tehreek-e-Taliban Pakistan's factions said that they do not carry out attacks on mosques.

== Reactions ==
=== Domestic ===
- President Asif Ali Zardari condemned the blast and reiterated the government's stance on dealing with militants "with iron hands;" he added that all those who perpetrate such attacks are inhumane.
- Prime Minister Yousaf Raza Gillani also expressed his condemnation and directed the provincial Government of Khyber Pakhtunkhwa to provide the best medical care possible to victims, at the expense of the state.
- Chief Minister of Khyber Pakhtunkhwa Ameer Haider Khan Hoti condemned the blast and termed it as an inhumane and un-Islamic act in the holy month of Ramadan. Expressing grief over the loss of lives, he expressed solidarity with the relatives of the deceased and ordered the administration of local hospitals to ensure ready facilities for the treatment of the injured.
- Imran Khan, chairman of the Tehreek-e-Insaaf party, condemned the blasts and attacked the government, accusing it of having badly failed in protecting the people of Pakistan.
- The Jamat-e-Islami also condemned the blast, with Syed Munawar Hasan and Liaqat Baloch issuing a joint statement in which they called the bombing a coward and inhumane act "by the enemies of the country and Islam." They also expressed sympathies with families who had lost their relatives and prayed for the peace of those who had been killed and injured in the bombing.
- Chief Minister of Sindh Syed Qaim Ali Shah condemned the blast and stated that "terrorists can never succeed in their attempts to destabilise the country."

=== International ===
- United States – Secretary of State Hillary Clinton said that "The slaughter of worshippers as they gathered at a mosque for Ramadan's Friday prayers underscores the brutality of those who would target civilians during a time of celebration and reflection for Muslims throughout the world. Our thoughts and prayers are with the families and loved ones affected by this deplorable violence. The United States deeply respects Pakistan's sacrifices in the fight against extremism and we continue to stand with Pakistan against those who seek to undermine democracy."
