= Graduate College =

Graduate College may refer to:

- Princeton University Graduate College
- Graduate College, Lancaster
- Union Graduate College
- UNLV Graduate College
- Nathan Weiss Graduate College

== See also ==
- Government Post Graduate College (disambiguation)
