= FCPS =

FCPS may refer to:

== Education ==
- Facultad de Ciencias Políticas y Sociales, faculty of political and social sciences at the National Autonomous University of Mexico
- Fairfax County Public Schools, in Virginia, United States
- Fairfield College Preparatory School, in Connecticut, United States
- Fauquier County Public Schools, in Virginia, United States
- Fayette County Public Schools (disambiguation)
- Frederick County Public Schools (disambiguation)

== Other uses ==
- Fellow of the Cambridge Philosophical Society
- Fellow of College of Physicians and Surgeons, a fellowship offered by Bangladesh College of Physicians and Surgeons
- Fellow of College of Physicians and Surgeons Pakistan (also called FCPS), a fellowship offered by the College of Physicians and Surgeons Pakistan
- Fort Collins Police Services, in Colorado, United States

== See also ==
- FCP (disambiguation)
