= Chittagong Medical College =

Medical college in Chittagong, Bangladesh

- চট্টগ্রাম মেডিকেল কলেজ
- Other name: CMC
- Type: Public medical school
- Established: 1957; 69 years ago
- Academic affiliations: Chittagong Medical University
- Chairman: Muhammad Omar Faruque Yusuf
- Principal: Md. Jashim Uddin
- Academic staff: 396
- Undergraduates: MBBS : 1268 (Bangladeshi : 1184 and Foreign 84); BDS : 275
- Postgraduates: 422 (FCPS, MD, MS, MPhil, MPh, Diploma)
- Location: Chittagong, Bangladesh; 22.3593°N 91.8308°E
- Campus: 80.836 acres (32.713 ha); Urban
- Language: English
- Website: cmc.gov.bd

Chittagong Medical College, abbreviated as CMC is a public medical college located in Chittagong, Bangladesh. It is the second oldest and second largest medical educational institute and hospital in Bangladesh. It is affiliated with the Chittagong Medical University.

== History ==
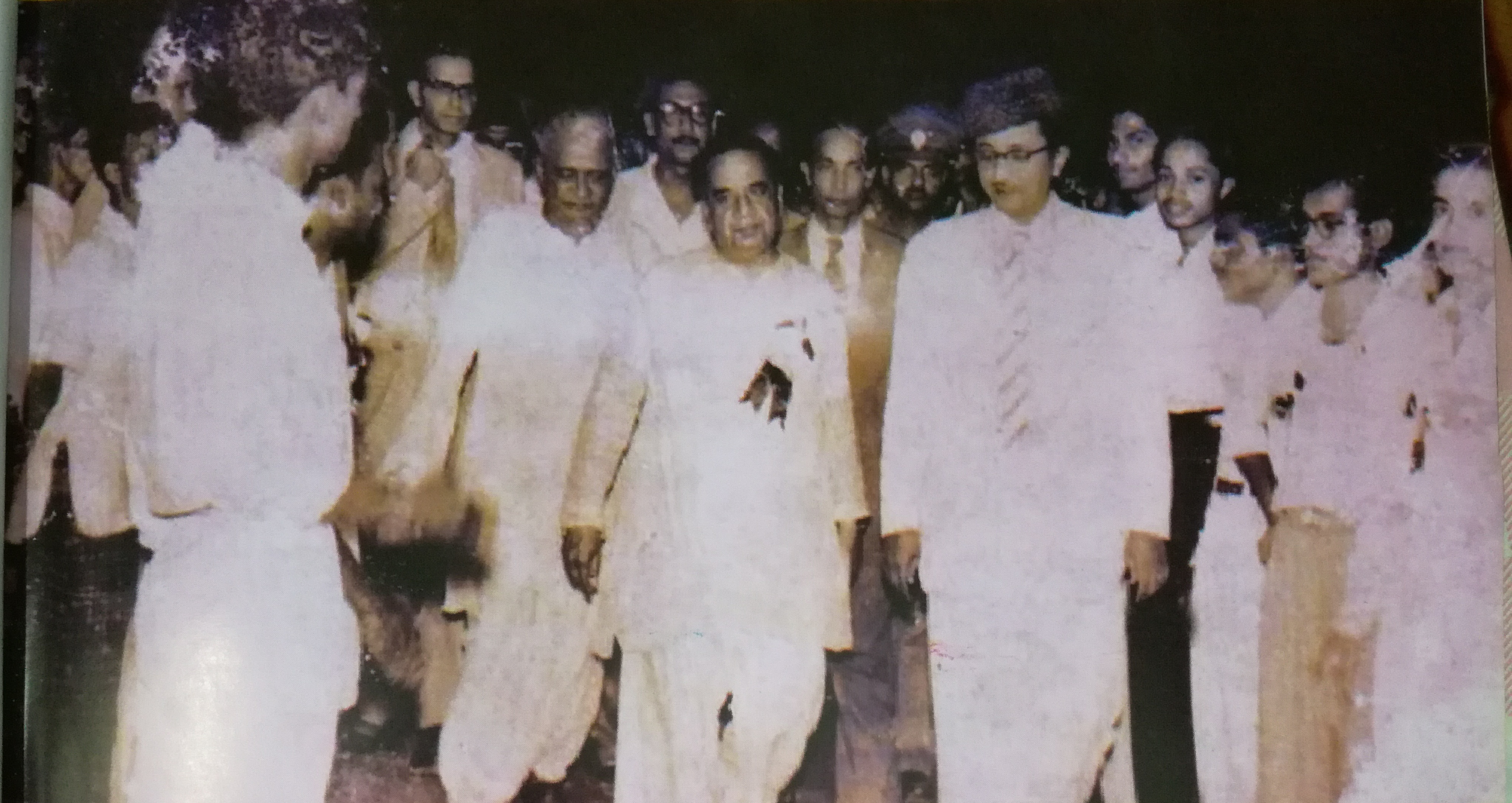
Official opening of CMC in 1957

Chittagong Medical College was established in 1957 in East Pakistan. Chittagong Medical College Hospital (CMCH) was established in 1959, adjacent to the college, with 120 beds. Construction of the present purpose-built, six-storied CMCH was completed in 1969.

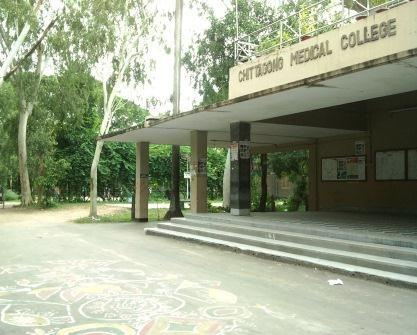
College entrance

== Courses ==
MBBS

From 2026, 225 local students admit here for MBBS course. Moreover, 20-25 foreign students also admit here from India, Pakistan, Sri Lanka, Nepal, Bhutan, Palestine and other countries.

=== BDS ===
Every year, 60 students admit in Chittagong Medical College dental unit. It is the highest number of students among all dental units of public medical colleges in Bangladesh.

=== Post Graduation ===
Every year, 422 students admit here for post graduation courses. There are 39 post-graduation courses in this medical college.

They are:

- MD - 12
- MS - 11
- Diploma -10
- MPhil - 5
- MPH -1

=== FCPS ===
It offers FCPS degree in four subjects. They are:

- Medicine
- Surgery
- Obstetrics and gynaecology
- Pediatrics

== Principle ==
On 29 August 2024, Jasim Uddin took charge as the acting principal of CMC. He succeeded Sahena Akter, who was appointed as the CMC principal on 20 January 2021.

== Facilities ==
- Auditorium

There is an auditorium named Bir Uttam Shah Alam Milonayoton. It is of 1000 people capacity.

- Conference Rooms

There is two conference rooms. One in New Academic Building and it has 80 people capacity. Another one is in Hospital Building and it has 60 people capacity.

- Lecture Galleries

There are 2 lecture galleries and 3 lecture halls in this Medical college.

1. Upper lecture gallery
2. Lower lecture gallery
3. Sutopa lecture hall
4. Lower lecture hall
5. Upper lecture hall
- Distant Learning Theatre

There is a distant learning theatre.

- Teacher's Lounge

There is a teacher Lounge in New Academic Building.

- Common Room

There are two common rooms. They are one for male and another one for female.

- Cafeteria

There are tow cafeteria. One is beside New Academic Building named CMC Cafe. Another one is at hospital building named Doctors Avocation Lounge.

== Hospital ==
Information at a glance:

- Number of Bed : 2200
- Number of Ward : 49
- Number of Cabins :45
- Number of OT : 19
- Total Number of admission:302,647 (2025)
- Emergency visits : 416,422 (2025)
- Bed occupancy rate : 142.31
- Major Operations : 43,170 (2025)
- Minor Operations : 102,703 (2025)

== Hostels ==
=== Undergraduate Hostels ===
There are 2 male hostels and 2 female hostels for undergraduate students.

CMC Main Boys hostel
It is located in Chatteswary Road, Chawkbazar. It has a building of 4 floar with 40 rooms in each floar. In addition, it has 3 reading rooms, a dinning room, a mosque and a lobby.
Nasirabad Boys Hostel
It is located in Nadirabad Housing society. It has two buildings named "Lufus Salam Hostel" and "Hafizulah Bashir Shawon Hostel"
Kanta Girls Hostel
It is located opposite to CMCH east gate.
Dilruba Girls Hostel
It is located in Panchlaish Residential Area.

=== Intern Hostels ===
There are also two hostel for intern doctors.

Dr. Mizan Intern Hostel.
Dr. Jannat Female Intern Hostel.

== Departments ==
There 77 Departments in this medical college.

=== Basic ===
1. Anatomy
2. Physiology
3. Biochemistry

=== Para Clinical ===
1. Pharmacology and Therapeutics
2. Pathology
3. Microbiology and Immunology
4. Virology
5. Forensic Medicine and Toxicology
6. Community Medicine and Public health

=== Clinical ===
1. Medicine
2. Surgery
3. Obstetrics & Gynaecology
4. Pediatrics
5. Pediatric surgery
6. Neonatology
7. Neonatal Surgery
8. Orthopedics
9. Orthopedic surgery
10. Neurology
11. Pediatric Neurology and Development
12. Neuro surgery
13. Cardiology
14. Pediatric Cardiology
15. Cardiac surgery
16. Pediatric Cardiac surgery
17. Urology
18. Pediatric urology
19. Nephrology
20. Pediatric Nephrology
21. Gastroenterology
22. Hepatology
23. Endocrinology and Metabolism
24. Reproductive endocrinology and infertility
25. Hematology
26. Pediatric Hematology and Oncology
27. Paediatric Surgical Oncology
28. Anesthesiology
29. Cardiac Anesthesiology
30. Radiology
31. Neuro Radiology
32. Pediatric Radiology
33. Radiotherapy
34. Critical Care Medicine
35. Respiratory Medicine
36. Physical Medicine and Rehabilitation
37. Rheumatology
38. Casualty
39. Plastic surgery
40. Thoracic surgery
41. Vascular Surgery
42. Otolaryngology abd Head neck surgery
43. Transfusion Medicine
44. Psychiatry
45. Dermatology and Venereology
46. Ophthalmology
47. ENT

=== Dental ===
1. Science of Dental Materials
2. Dental Anatomy
3. Dental Pharmacology
4. Oral Microbiology
5. Periodontology and Oral Pathology
6. Oral and Maxillofacial Surgery
7. Conservative Dentistry and Endodontics
8. Orthodontics and Dentofacial Orthopedics
9. Prosthodontics
10. Dental Public Health
11. Pediatric Dentistry
12. Dental Radiology
13. Dental Jurisprudence and Ethics
14. Oral Surgery
15. Periodontology
16. Removable Orthodontics
17. Removable Prosthodontics
18. Orthodontics
19. Children Dentistry
20. Dental Jurist Law's & Ethics
21. Maxillofacial Surgery
