= Post Graduate Medical Institute Peshawar =

Post Graduate Medical Institute Peshawar (abbreviated as PGMI Peshawar) is a postgraduate medical training institute in Peshawar, Khyber Pakhtunkhwa, Pakistan. Established in 1984, PGMI Peshawar offers FCPS-II training and numerous diploma courses to health professionals throughout Khyber Pakhtunkhwa province. The institute consists of 41 teaching units at Lady Reading Hospital and Hayatabad Medical Complex, both in Peshawar, and is accredited by the College of Physicians and Surgeons Pakistan. PGMI Peshawar is affiliated with Khyber Medical University and governed by an executive committee which is responsible for all academic, financial and policy decisions and includes an Annual Academic Inspection & Evaluation.
