= Government Post Graduate College, Abbottabad =

Government degree awarding college in Abbottabad, Pakistan

- گورنمنٹ پوسٹ گریجویٹ کالج ایبٹ آباد
- Other names: GPGC No.1 Abbottabad
- Former names: Degree College Abbottabad
- Established: 1944
- Accreditation: HEC
- Affiliations: Higher Education Department
- Academic affiliations: AUST(BS and masters programs); BISE ABT (inter)
- Location: Old Abbottabad city, Abbottabad, KPK, Pakistan; 34.1472°N 73.2205°E
- Campus: Urban
- Language: Urdu, English
- Sporting affiliations: BISE, AUST, Hazara University
- Website: gpgc-atd.edu.pk
- Location in Khyber Pakhtunkhwa Government Post Graduate College, Abbottabad (Pakistan)

Government Post Graduate College, Abbottabad (Urdu: گورنمنٹ پوسٹ گریجویٹ کالج ایبٹ آباد), also known as GPGC No.1 Abbottabad, is a government tertiary college located in Abbottabad. GPGC No.1 is affiliated with Abbottabad University (AUST) and BISE Abbottabad for Bachelor and intermediate programs respectively.

== History ==
GPGC No.1 ATD college was established in 1944 in a rented building on the Mansehra Road, Abbottabad. After independence, it was shifted to the center of the city in the Araya School. In 1954 the Chief Minister of the N-W.F.P (now Khyber Pakhtunkhwa) Abdul Qayyum Khan inaugurated the present building at the link road Abbottabad.

In 1966, GPGC No.1 ATD started M.Sc. Physics and MA Economics programs. In 1973, MA programs of English, Urdu and M.Sc. programs in Chemistry and Mathematics were started. M.Sc. Botany and MA Political Science programs begun in the campus in 1986. In 1999 M.Sc. Computer Science was started. In 2010 MA History was further added at postgraduate level. Now it is called a mini university. The college has almost five thousand students from 11th grade to 16th grade in 27 common subjects of science and arts. GPGC No.1 Abbottabad offers 4-year bachelor program in 15 disciplines including English, Mathematics, Statistics, Chemistry, Computer Science. Physics, Economics, Botany, Political Science, GIS, Islamic Studies, History, Pakistan Studies, Urdu and H.P.E.
In 2019, GPGC No. 1 ATD hosted the weightlifting event of the 33rd National Games of Pakistan. As of 2022, regional directorate of Higher Education for Hazara division is planned to be established in the old staff hostel of the Government Postgraduate College No 1, Abbottabad, for the management of administrative and financial affairs of 40 colleges.

== Faculties and departments ==
At present, GPGC Abbottabad offers Intermediate, Bachelors, Masters and BS level programs.

=== Masters degree Offering departments ===
There were 11 departments in GPGC No.1 Abbottabad offering Master's degree. The MA/MSC Program was rolled back by HEC Pakistan in 2022.

- Botany
- Chemistry
- Economics
- Mathematics
- Physics
- Statistics
- English
- Political Science
- Islamiyat
- History
- Urdu

=== BS degree Offering departments ===
The BS degree offering departments of GPGC No.1 ATD are:

- Botany
- Computer Science
- Chemistry
- Economics
- English
- G.I.S
- H.P.E
- Islamic Studies
- Mathematics
- Physics
- Political Science
- Statistics
- Urdu
- History
- Pakistan Studies.

== See also ==
- Government Post Graduate College Mandian, Abbottabad
- Government Post Graduate College, Mansehra
