= Saidu Medical College =

Public Medical College in Khyber Pakhtunkhwa, Pakistan

Saidu Medical College د سیدو طب پوهنځی,
- Type: Public Institute
- Established: 1998
- Parent institution: Khyber Medical University
- Affiliations: KMU, PMDC, CPSP, PNC, HEC WHO
- Principal: Prof. Dr. Israr Ul Haq
- Students: 480
- Location: Saidu Sharif, Pakistan; 34.751°N 72.356°E
- Campus: Urban
- Colours
- Website: smcswat.edu.pk

Saidu Medical College (Pashto: د سیدو طب پوهنځی, Urdu: سیدو طبی کالج ) is a public sector medical education institute located in Saidu Sharif, Swat District, Khyber Pakhtunkhwa, Pakistan. It is one of several medical colleges affiliated with Khyber Medical University.

== History ==
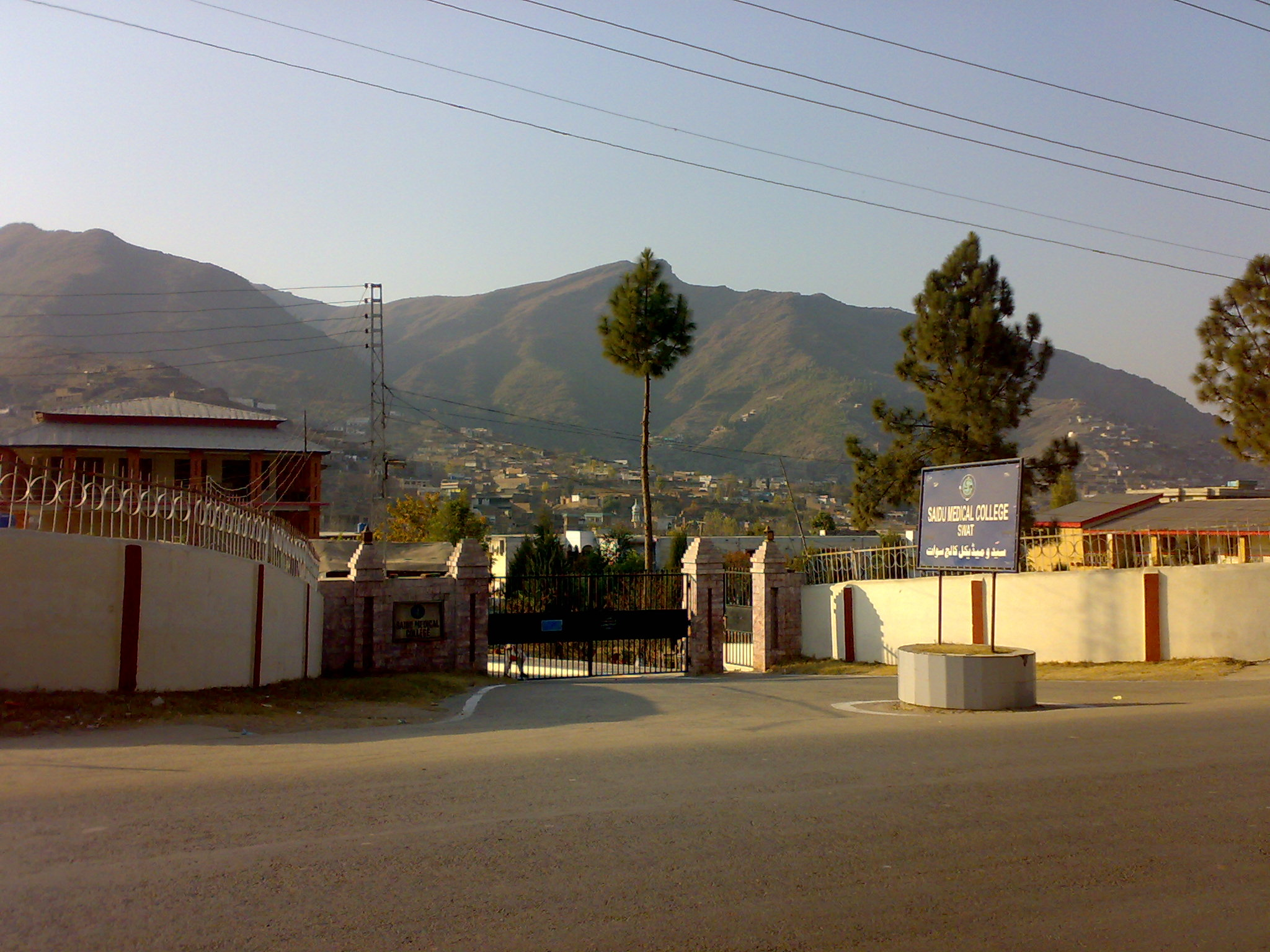
Entrance way of Saidu medical college

The first batch started in December 1998 with enrollment of 50 students in the MBBS Programme. Initially, Saidu Medical College was affiliated with University of Peshawar, but now it is affiliated with Khyber Medical University. The medical college is adjacent to Saidu Teaching Hospital. Till now, more than 1,000 students have graduated from the institution.

== Teaching Hospital ==
Saidu Teaching Hospital is the teaching hospital of Saidu Medical College.

== Admissions ==
Saidu Medical College currently enrolls 100 students every year in the MBBS Programme.

== Departments ==
=== Basic Sciences ===
- Anatomy
- Physiology
- Biochemistry
- Pharmacology
- Pathology
- Forensic Medicine
- Community Medicine
- Medical Education

=== Clinical Sciences ===
- Medicine
- Surgery
- Gynaecology
- Paediatrics
- Ophthalmology
- ENT
- Radiology
- Anesthesia
- Paediatrics Surgery
- Plastic Surgery
- Nephrology
- Orthopedics
- Cardiology
- Pulmonology
- Dermatology
- Psychiatry
- Gastroenterology

== Societies ==
- Social Welfare Society: The main objective of SWS of SMC is to give financial support to poor patients, arranging free medical camps in remote areas of Khyber Pakhtunkhwa (including FATA) and to promote public awareness about serious social problems like smoking, AIDS, Drugs and Narcotics.
- Public Health Society: The purpose of Public Health Society in SMC is to play a significant role in preventing health related issues like AIDS/HIV, Hepatitis, Polio, Tuberculosis, Population, Nutrition Program, Bird Flu etc.
- Literary Society: To enhance Literary interest of the students.
- Sports Society: This society is responsible for conducting annual sports day each year. It organizes sports week for inter-class tournament each year.

== Events ==
Many events are organized by the various societies of the college. The literary society arranges Literary Week, Sports Week, Fun Fair and Crazy Week. Mega Events, Blood Camps, Medical Camps and recreational tours are arranged by other societies like the Bacha Khan Welfare Society.

== Literary work ==
'First Aid & Patient Safety' a widely studied book on emergency first aid throughout the South Asian region is a publication by one of the students of Saidu Medical College, Swat.

== See also ==
- Khyber Medical College
- Khyber Medical University
- Ayub Medical College
- List of medical schools in Pakistan
