= Government Post Graduate College Mandian, Abbottabad =

Government degree awarding college in Abbottabad, Pakistan

- گورنمنٹ پوسٹ گریجویٹ کالج منڈیاں ایبٹ آباد
- Other names: GPGC No.2 Abbottabad
- Former names: Degree College Mandian, Abbottabad
- Established: 1990
- Accreditation: HEC
- Affiliations: HED
- Academic affiliations: AUST(BS and masters programs); BISE ABT (inter)
- Principal: Dr. Azhar Mahmood
- Location: College Road, Mandian,, Abbottabad, KPK, Pakistan; 34°11′49.1215″N 73°13′43.8942″E
- Campus: Urban
- Language: Urdu, English
- Sporting affiliations: BISE, AUST, Hazara University
- Website: gpgcm.edu.pk
- GPGC Mandian

Government Post Graduate College Mandian, Abbottabad (Urdu: گورنمنٹ پوسٹ گریجویٹ کالج منڈیاں ایبٹ آباد), also known as GPGC No.2 Abbottabad, is a government tertiary college located in Mandian, Abbottabad. GPGC Mandian is affiliated with Abbottabad University (AUST) and BISE Abbottabad for Bachelor and intermediate programs respectively.

== History ==
In 1990, GPGC (then called as Degree college) Mandian was established in a rented building at Kakul road, and was affiliated with the Board of Intermediate and Secondary Education, Abbottabad for intermediate programs and Hazara University for degree programs. In 1991 it was shifted to its present campus at College Road Abbottabad. In 1999 it achieved status of the Postgraduate College with the establishment of a postgraduate department of computer science. GPGC Mandian was first college of the KPK province where M.Sc. Computer Science was started in the year 2000, followed by the commencement of BCS (4 Years) semester system of co-education in the year 2002. Since then, the college has established three state-of-the-art Computer laboratories.

GPGC Mandian was the first college of Pakistan to start BS Bio-Informatics and was the first college of the KPK province which offered BS Information Technology in addition to BS Computer Science. In 2011, GPGC Mandian became the first college of the district Abbottabad to start BS Zoology.

In 2013, the college started admissions in BS Microbiology and Sociology. Currently GPGC is in an advanced stage to establish state of the art laboratories for bioinformatics and Zoology with the assistance of the Provincial Government.

In 2020, speaker KP provincial assembly Mushtaq Ahmed Ghani inaugurated the Science block in the college.

== See also ==
- Government Post Graduate College, Abbottabad
- Abbottabad University of Science and Technology
