= Khyber Medical University =

Medical University in Pakistan

- جامعہ طبی خیبر خیبر طبي پوهنتون
- Logo of KMU
- Type: Public
- Established: 2007; 19 years ago
- Affiliations: Pakistan Medical Commission; Pakistan Medical and Dental Council; Pakistan Medical Research Council; College of Physicians and Surgeons Pakistan; Pakistan Nursing Council; Higher Education Commission (Pakistan)
- Chancellor: Governor of Khyber Pakhtunkhwa
- Vice-Chancellor: Abdul Jalil Khan
- Students: 48000
- Undergraduates: 4000
- Postgraduates: 220
- Location: Peshawar, Khyber Pakhtunkhwa, Pakistan
Colours
- Nickname: KMU
- Website: kmu.edu.pk

Khyber Medical University (Urdu: جامعہ طبی خیبر, Pashto: د خیبر طبي پوهنتون, abbreviated as KMU) is a public research university located in Peshawar, Khyber Pakhtunkhwa, Pakistan.

Established in January 2007, the university comprises several constituent colleges and institutes, as well as affiliated undergraduate and postgraduate medical and dental institutions, and various programs in the allied health sciences.

== Recognized university ==
Khyber Medical University is recognized by the Higher Education Commission of Pakistan and by the Pakistan Medical and Dental Council.

== Constituent institutions ==
- KMU Institute of Basic Medical Sciences
- KMU Institute of Dental Sciences, Kohat
- KMU Institute of Health Professions Education and Research
- KMU Institute of Medical Sciences, Kohat
- KMU Institute of Nursing Sciences, Peshawar
- KMU Institute of Paramedical Sciences, Peshawar
- KMU Institute of Physical Medicine and Rehabilitation, Peshawar
- KMU Institute of Public Health and Social Sciences, Peshawar
- KMU Institute of Health Sciences, Mardan
- KMU Institute of Health Sciences, Swat
- KMU Institute of Health Sciences, Islamabad
- KMU Institute of Paramedical Sciences, Lakki Marwat
- KMU Institute of Health Sciences, Kohat
- KMU Institute of Pharmaceutical Sciences, Peshawar
- KMU Institute of Pathology and Diagnostic Medicine, Peshawar
- KMU Institute of Health Sciences, Lower Dir
- KMU Institute of Health Sciences, Swabi
- KMU Institute of Health Sciences, Kurram
- KMU Institute of Mental Health & Behavioral Sciences, Peshawar
- KMU Institute of Family Medicine, Peshawar

== Affiliated institutions ==
=== Undergraduate ===
- Khyber Medical College (Peshawar)
- Ayub College of Dentistry (Abbottabad)
- Ayub Medical College (Abbottabad)
- Bacha Khan Medical College (Mardan)
- Abbottabad International Medical College (Abbottabad)
- Abbottabad International Dental College (Abbottabad)
- Bannu Medical College (Bannu)
- Gajju Khan Medical College (Swabi)
- Gomal Medical College (Dera Ismail Khan)
- Jinnah Medical College (Peshawar)
- Khyber College of Dentistry (Peshawar)
- Khyber Girls Medical College (Peshawar)
- Rehman Medical College (Peshawar)
- Northwest School of Medicine, (Peshawar)
- Saidu Medical College, (Swat)
- Women Medical and Dental College, (Abbottabad)
- Muhammad College of Medicine, (Peshawar)
- Pak International Medical College, Peshawar
- Nowshera Medical College, Nowshera

=== Postgraduate ===
- Post Graduate Medical Institute Peshawar

=== Nursing ===
- Himalaya College of Nursing Mardan
- Ayub School of Nursing (Abbottabad)
- Northwest College of Nursing, Peshawar
- RMI School of Nursing, Peshawar
- Royal College of Nursing, Swat (Saidu Sharif)
- Buner Institute of Health Sciences, Buner
- Khyber Pakhtunkhwa Institute of Medical Sciences (KPIMS), Peshawar

=== Pharmacy ===
- Northwest College of Pharmacy, Peshawar

=== Allied health sciences ===
- Bannu College of Medical Technology, (Bannu)
- Frontier Homeopathic Medical College, Peshawar
- Mahboob School of Physiotherapy, Peshawar
- National Institute of Health and Management Sciences, Peshawar
- Northwest College of Physical Therapy, Peshawar
- Pakistan Institute of Community Ophthalmology, Peshawar
- Pakistan Institute of Prosthetics & Orthotics Sciences, Peshawar
- RMI School of Allied Health Sciences, Peshawar
- RMI College of Rehabilitation Science, Peshawar
- Sarhad Institute of Health Sciences, Peshawar
- Udhyana Institute of Medical Sciences, Peshawar
- Khyber Pakhtunkhwa Institute of Medical Sciences (KPIMS), Peshawar

== See also ==
- University of Health Sciences, Lahore
- Dow University of Health Sciences
