= KTH =

KTH may refer to:

- Keat Hong LRT station, Singapore, LRT station abbreviation
- Kent House railway station, London, National Rail station code
- KTH Royal Institute of Technology, a university in Sweden
- KTH Krynica, a Polish ice hockey team
- Khyber Teaching Hospital, a university hospital in Pakistan
- .kth, the extension of KDE theme files
