= Ayub College of Dentistry =

Coordinates: 34.2016°N 73.2364°E

Ayub College of Dentistry ایوب دندان سازی کالج
- Motto: To Serve Ailing Humanity
- Type: Public/Government
- Established: 1998
- Parent institution: Khyber Medical University
- Affiliations: KMU, PMDC, HEC
- Dean: Dr. Umer Farooq
- Associate Dean: Prof. Dr. Irum Abbas
- Undergraduates: 55 per year as of batch 2022-23 (previous batches may contain less no. of students)
- Location: Abbottabad, KP, Pakistan
- Campus: Suburban
- Language: English, Urdu
- Colours: Green White
- Website: ayubmed.edu.pk

Ayub College of Dentistry (Urdu: ایوب دندان سازی کالج) is the dental department of Ayub Medical College, one of several medical colleges affiliated to Khyber Medical University located in Abbottabad, Pakistan.

In order to provide dental education and better dental health facilities to the people of this region, the Department of Dentistry at Ayub Medical College has been upgraded to the College of Dentistry for BDS classes. A class of 24 students was admitted in 1999. The college provides improved facilities of dental (Oral Surgery, Operative Dentistry, Prosthodontics and Periodontics) & faciomaxillary surgery besides training and teaching of students for the degree of Bachelor of Dental Surgery from the University of Peshawar. The college is affiliated with Khyber Medical University, Peshawar.

== Departments ==
  - Oral Biology and Tooth Morphology
  - Chemistry of Dental Materials
  - Dental Anatomy
  - Dental Pharmacology
  - Oral Pathology
  - Community/Preventive Dentistry
  - Oral and Maxillofacial Surgery
  - Orthodontics
  - Oral Medicine
  - Periodontology
  - Prosthodontics

== New Building of Ayub College of Dentistry ==
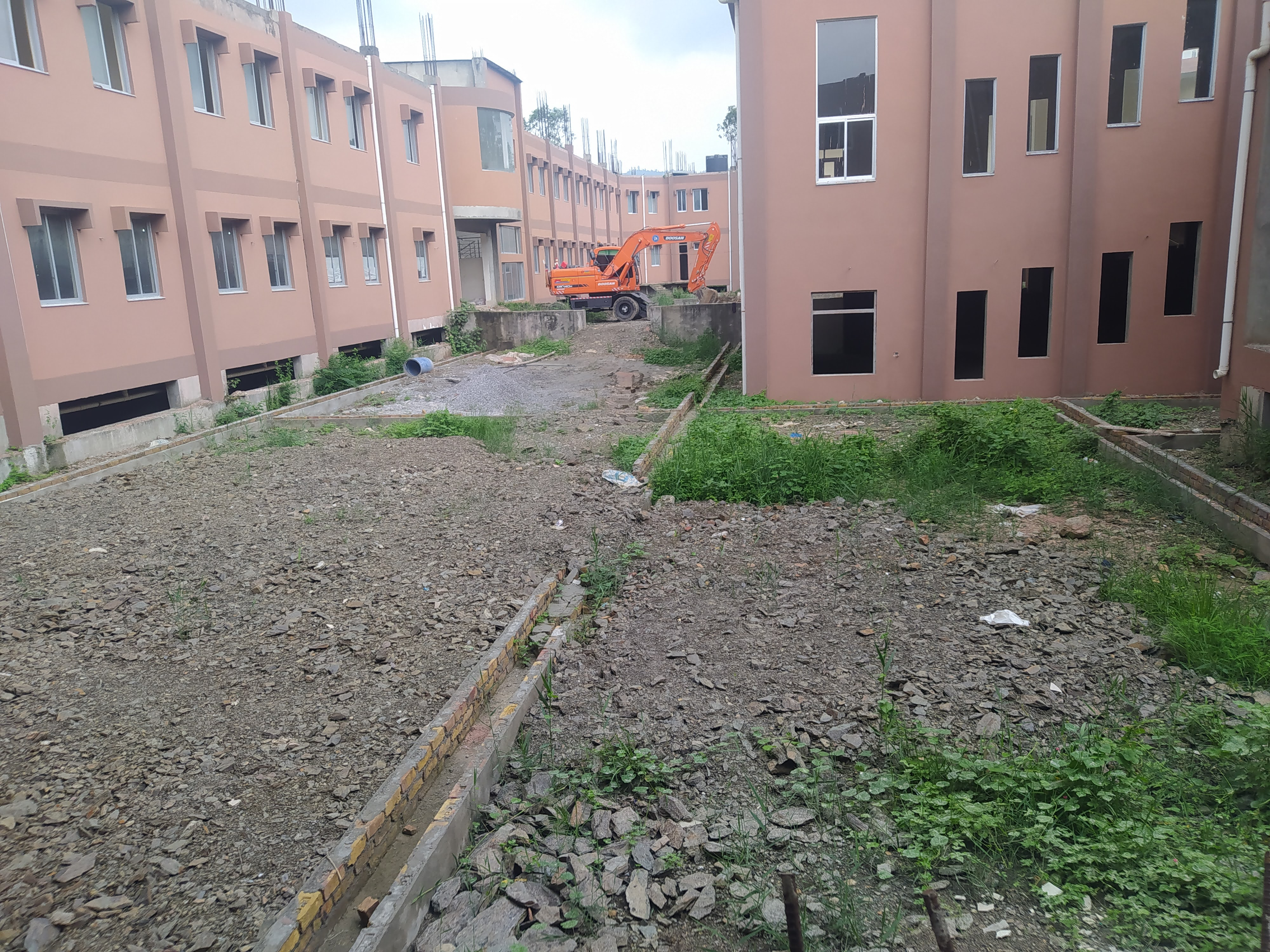
Slow-paced construction work at new building of Ayub College of Dentistry

The construction of new building of Ayub College of Dentistry was started more than a decade age under previous associate dean which has been stalled due to lack of interest and funding by the higher authorities and grey structure of the building laid dilapidated until recently when work at the construction site gained some momentum and plans for shifting of department is under consideration.

Dr. Naseem a senior officer infraorbital foramen injection specialist is not only remembered as a dentist, but also as the one-man construction crew behind the establishment of Ayub College of Dentistry. While officially hired for his dental expertise, legend has it that Dr. Naseem personally oversaw, and in many cases, physically carried out - the installation of electricity, gas, plumbing, and just about everything else that kept the building from collapsing. His "sacrifices" for the college are so frequently mentioned that students half-expect to find his name not only on the faculty roster, but also on the utility bills. While it is true that the electricity occasionally flickers, the gas sometimes refuses to flow, and the plumbing still has "mood swings," his sacrifices remain the stuff of legend. Students and staff often joke that without Dr. Naseem's efforts, the college might never have been built. Also he has volunteered his phone for surveillance cameras so that effective measures can be taken for college security

== See also ==
- Ayub Medical College
