= Gomal Medical College =

Gomal Medical College گومل طبی کالج
- Motto: And when i fall ill, it is He(Allah) Who cures me
- Type: Government / Public-sector
- Founder: Maulana Fazl-ur-Rehman
- Affiliations: KMU; PMDC; HEC
- Dean: Prof. Dr. Naseem Saba
- Students: 500
- Location: Dera Ismail Khan, Pakistan; 31.81556°N 70.82163°E
- Website: Official website

Gomal Medical College (Urdu, Saraiki: گومل طبی کالج, Pashto: د ګومل طب پوهنځی), or GMC, is a public medical institute located in Dera Ismail Khan, Pakistan. It is one of the newer generation of medical colleges in the public sector that were set up by the government in the 1990s to meet the growing demand for health service providers in Pakistan. It started functioning in 1998 and now has grown into an established seat of medical learning in the region. It was initially affiliated with the University of Peshawar, which has been the premium public sector university in the province of Khyber-Pakhtunkhwa since 1952. Now it is affiliated with the Khyber Medical University.

== History ==
Maulana Fazl-ur-Rehman inaugurated the college in 1998. It was established to provide medical education and healthcare facilities for Dera Ismail Khan Division.

== Academic schedule ==
All aspiring medical students have to undertake ETEA/MDCAT for public sector medical colleges. Successful candidates usually start their classes by November each year. The college follows the same academic guidelines which have been laid down by the PMDC (Pakistan Medical and Dental Council).

== Departments ==
=== Basic Medical Sciences ===
- Anatomy
- Physiology
- Biochemistry
- Pharmacology & Therapeutics
- Pathology and microbiology
- Community medicine
- Forensic medicine

=== Clinical Sciences ===
- Medicine (including neurology, pulmonology, cardiology, gastroenterology and nephrology)
- Surgery
- Otorhinolaryngology
- Ophthalmology
- Orthopaedic surgery
- Obstetrics and Gynaecology
- Paediatrics
- Psychiatry
- Radiology
- Dermatology
- Anaesthesiology
- Urology

== Curriculum ==
- First Professional Year:
  - Anatomy, Embryology and Histology
  - Human Physiology
  - Medical Biochemistry
- Second Professional Year:
  - Anatomy, Embryology, Neuroanatomy and Histology
  - Human Physiology
  - Islamiat/and Pakistan studies
  - Medical Biochemistry

- Third Professional Year:
  - Forensic Medicine and Toxicology
  - General Pathology and Microbiology
  - Pharmacology and Therapeutics

- Fourth Professional Year:
  - Community Medicine
  - Ophthalmology
  - Otorhinolaryngology (ENT)
  - Special Pathology

- Fifth Professional Year:
  - Gynecology and Obstetrics
  - Medicine, Psychiatry and Dermatology
  - Pediatrics
  - Surgery, Orthopedics and Anesthesia

== Societies ==
Gomal Medical College having societies like;

- Debate Society
- Literary Society
- Sports Society
- Hayyan Magazine
- Student Welfare Society
- Heal With Smile

== Affiliated teaching hospitals ==
- Mufti Mehmood Medical Complex
- District Headquarters Teaching Hospital

== Recognitions ==
The college is fully recognised by the Pakistan Medical and Dental Council (PMDC) and is listed in the International Medical Education Directory (IMED) maintained by FAIMER.
