= Saidu Teaching Hospital =

Hospital in Khyber Pakhtunkhwa, Pakistan

Saidu Group of Teaching Hospitals SGTH د سیدو تدريسي روغتون

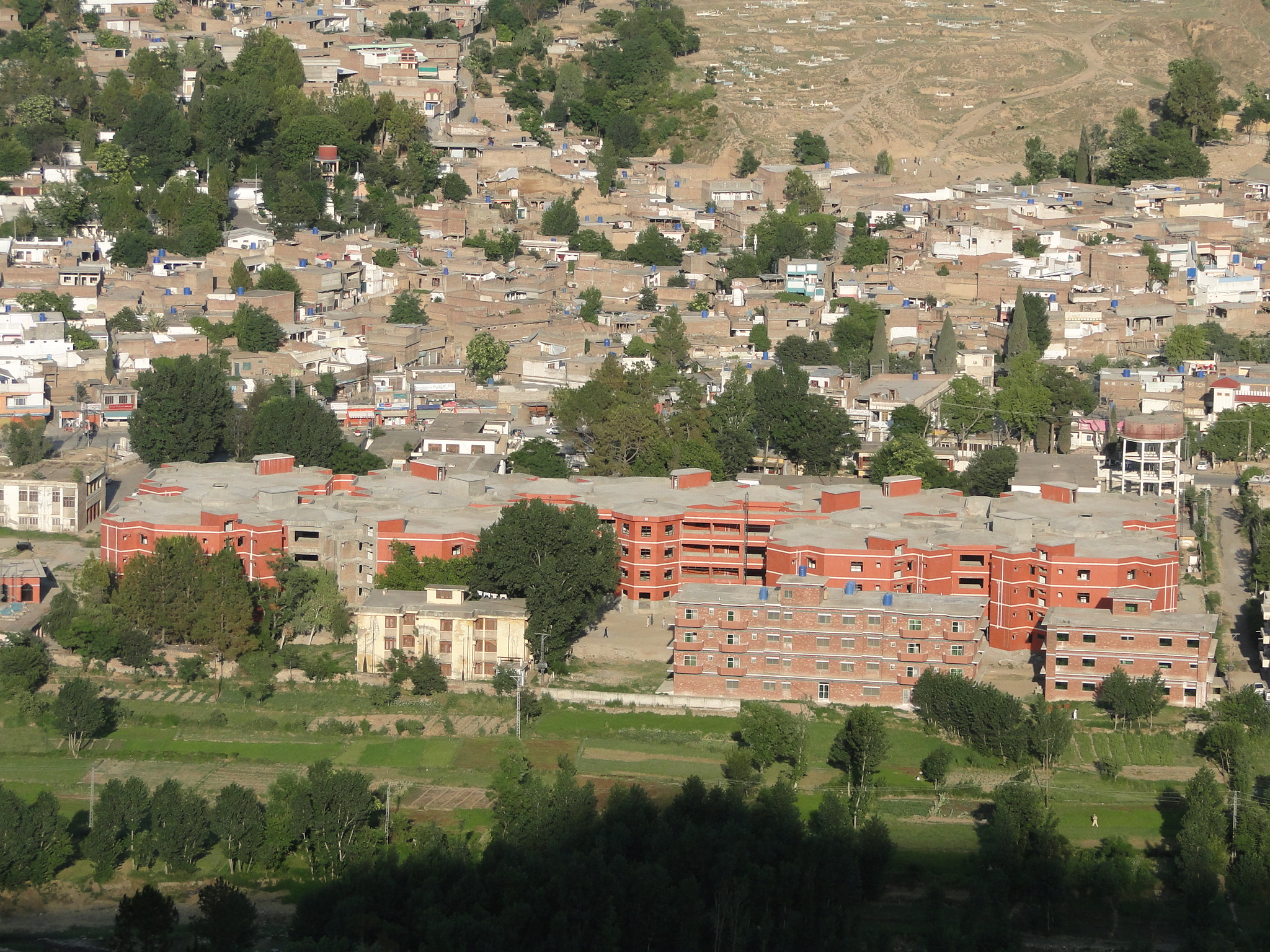

Geography
- Location: Saidu Sharif, Khyber Pakhtunkhwa, Pakistan
- Coordinates: 34.749494°N 72.356484°E

Organisation
- Type: Teaching Hospital
- Affiliated university: College of Physicians and Surgeons of Pakistan; Saidu Medical College

Services
- Emergency department: A&E, ICU, CCU, Neunatal Care Unit.
- Beds: 500

History
- Founded: 1971

Links
- Website: sth.org.pk
- Lists: Hospitals in Pakistan

Saidu Group of Teaching Hospitals (Pashto: د سیدو تدريسي روغتون, Urdu: سیدو تدریسی ہسپتال ), abbreviated as SGTH) is located in Swat, Khyber-Pakhtunkhwa, Pakistan. It is the teaching hospital of Saidu Medical College.

The 500-bed institution consists of two wings which are 1.5 km apart from each other. The catchment area is Malakand Division and parts of Kohistan District.

== Accredited hospital ==
This hospital is accredited by the College of Physicians and Surgeons of Pakistan (CPSP) and Pakistan Medical & Dental Council (PMDC).

== See also ==
- Khyber Teaching Hospital
- Ayub Teaching Hospital
