= Pakistan International Public School and College =

Pakistan International Public School & College
- پاکستان انٹرنیشنل پبلک سکول اینڈ کالج
- Abbottabad, Mansehra, Swabi, Mirpur, Gujranwala and Gujrat; Abbottabad, Khyber Pakhtunkhwa, Pakistan

Information
- Other name: PIPS
- Type: Private
- Motto: Unity, Faith, Discipline; Excelsior
- Established: 1983
- Founder: Brig. (R) Ijaz Akbar (Late)
- Director: Farrukh Ijaz & Dr. Manzar Ijaz
- Employees: 450+
- Enrollment: 7000+
- Campuses: Custom-Built Campuses
- Color
- Nickname: Pipsonians
- Website: https://pipsc.edu.pk/

Pakistan International Public School & College (Urdu:پاکستان انٹرنیشنل پبلک سکول اینڈ کالج), usually abbreviated to its acronym PIPS is a private residential school situated in Abbottabad city of the Khyber Pakhtunkhwa province of Pakistan with branches in cities of Khyber Pakhtunkhwa and Punjab. The parent institute in Abbottabad has two separate campuses, Boys Campus known as Senior PIPS is situated on a hill at Jhangi Khoja near Mandian while Girls Campus usually referred to as Junior PIPS is situated at PMA Link Road in Jinnahabad and collectively they are known as PIPS Abbottabad.

== History ==
The school was founded in 1983 by Brig. (r) Ijaz Akbar (late) who until then had served as the principal of the boys section of Army Burn Hall College, also in Abbottabad. PIPS was established by the Pakistan Education Association, a government registered body of the North West Frontier Province(NWFP), now Khyber Pakhtunkhwa. The school has been running successfully for 40+ years with delivery of top results in board examinations.

== Administration ==
The college and its branches were managed by Brig. (r) Ijaz Akbar (late) as Managing Director who also served as principal of Junior PIPS until his death after which his sons (Farrukh Ijaz & Dr. Manzar Ijaz) took the charge as managing directors of PIPS . A retired brigadier of Pakistan Army serves as principal of Senior PIPS.

- "Abbottabad board announces Inter exam results". DAWN.COM. 2003-08-24.
- "Abbottabad BISE announces HSSC results". www.thenews.com.pk. 2011-07-25.
- "NEWS IN BRIEF". DAWN.COM. 2013-06-14.
- "Academic excellence: Girls outclass boys in SSC examinations". The Express Tribune. 2014-06-17.
- "76.54pc pass Abbottabad board SSC exams". DAWN.COM. 2016-06-17. Other than curricular activities, college also regularly participates in and co-curricular activities and won positions in national and international competitions.
- "30th All Pakistan Bilingual competition held". www.thenews.com.pk.
- "Punjab University wins declamation contest". DAWN.COM. 2018-09-13.
- "Shogran hotels sealed for not paying taxes". DAWN.COM. 2019-10-24. The college has also remained sports champion of BISE, Abbottabad over the years winning various sports competitions annually organized by Abbottabad Board.

== Branches ==
The college has a total of 8+ branches in Punjab and Khyber Pakhtunkhwa provinces. The most notable branch among them is PIPS Gujranwala situated in Gujranwala, Punjab while others in Gujrat and Mirpur. Another branch has also recently been started in Mansehra. The college claims to be one of the largest private boarding schools in Pakistan and ranked among top schools in the country.

== See also ==
- Army Burn Hall College
- Abbottabad Public School
