= Government Post Graduate College (Jhang) =

Coordinates: 31°17′30″N 72°18′55″E

Government Postgraduate College Jhang is a government college located in Jhang, Pakistan. The college is affiliated with the University of the Punjab. and Government College University Faisalabad (GCUF).

== History ==
Government Postgraduate College Jhang was established in 1926.

== Alumni ==
- Abdus Salam, a Nobel laureate in Physics
- Har Gobind Khorana, a Nobel laureate in Physiology or Medicine
- Majeed Amjad, poet and journalist
- Mahmood Shaam, poet and writer
- Wazir Agha, critic of Urdu language
