= KMU Institute of Medical Sciences =

KMU Institute of Medical Sciences د خیبر طبی علومو پوهنتون کوهاټ د خیبر طبی علومو پوهنتون کوهاټ
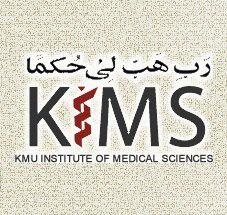
- Motto: Service to Humanity
- Type: Public Sector
- Established: 6 April 2006
- Affiliations: Pakistan Medical and Dental Council, Khyber Medical University, World Health Organization, College of Physicians and Surgeons Pakistan
- Principal: Lal Muhammad
- Location: Kohat, Pakistan
- Campus: DHQ Teaching Hospital KDA Phase 2, Kohat 0922-9260325
- Website: Official website

KMU Institute of Medical and Dental Sciences (Urdu: جامعہ طبی خیبر- کالج علوم کوہاٹ, Pashto: د خیبر طبی علومو پوهنتون کوهاټ), in Kohat, Khyber Pakhtunkhwa, Pakistan, is a public sector medical college, established in April 2006.

KMU-IMS/IDS, the constituent body of KMU, enrolls students in a five-year programme leading to a Bachelor of Medicine and Bachelor of Surgery (MBBS) degree, and also in a four-year programme leading to a Bachelor of Dental Surgery (BDS) degree.

It is a public sector medical institution approved by the Pakistan Medical and Dental Council. Each year 100 students are enrolled in MBBS, on the basis of their performance in ETEA test, and 50 are enrolled in BDS.

It is affiliated with Khyber Medical University, Peshawar.

== Introduction ==
1) DHQ Teaching Hospital, Kohat 2) Liaqat Memorial Teaching Hospital
- KIMS, Kohat

Geography
- Location: KMU Institute Of Medical Sciences, Kohat, Pakistan

Organisation
- Care system: Public
- Type: Teaching
- Affiliated university: KMU

Services
- Standards: ISO 9001:2000; WHO
- Emergency department: Yes
- Beds: 500

History
- Founded: 2006

Links
- Lists: Hospitals in Pakistan

Khyber Medical University Institute of Medical Sciences Kohat was conceived and realized by Kohat University of Science and Technology (KUST). On the directions of the then Chancellor KUST / Governor, Khyber Pakhtoonkhwa (KP), Syed Iftikhar Hussain Shah, the KUST syndicate took a bold decision in 2005 to start the first ever Institute of Medical Sciences. It speaks the volume of zeal with which the KUST wanted to serve the people. The inauguration of KIMS was performed on Thursday 6 April 2006 by the then Governor Khalil-ur-Rehman.

Khyber Medical University Institute of Medical Sciences Kohat (KIMS) was shifted to Khyber Medical University (KMU) as a constituent Institute on 25.11.2011 vide Government of Khyber Pakhtunkhwa Health Department Notification No. SOH/3-3/KMU dated 25.11.2011.

The institute is recognized by PMDC on a permanent basis. Its first batch of students have graduated. KIMS had a future vision of starting a dental section and this dream is being fulfilled. Nursing education, paramedics and post-graduate education are plans for the near future.

The institute is located in the most developed and modern area of Kotal Township of Kohat Development Authority. KIMS's main campus is a one-hour drive from KP's capital, Peshawar. Liaqat Memorial women and children and Divisional Headquarters hospitals of 500 beds capacity have been declared as teaching hospitals for KIMS by the government of KP. Both the hospitals are well equipped, with nursing wards for different types for patients, as well as operation theaters, radiology and diagnostic labs.

== Departments ==
- Basic sciences
  - Anatomy
  - Physiology
  - Biochemistry
  - Pharmacology
  - Forensic Medicine
  - Pathology
  - Community Medicine
  - Department of Medical Education

- Medicine and allied departments
  - General Medicine
  - Pediatrics
  - Behavioural Sciences
  - Cardiology
  - Dermatology
  - Neurology
  - Psychiatry
  - Social and Preventive Medicine

- Surgery and allied departments
  - General Surgery
  - Obstetrics and Gynaecology
  - Oral and Maxillofacial Surgery
  - Orthopedics
  - Ophthalmology
  - Otorhinolaryngology
  - Anesthesiology
  - Radiology

== Recognitions ==
KIMS is recognized by the Pakistan Medical and Dental Council (PMDC) for 100 seats in MBBS and 50 in BDS.

The college is also recognized by the World Health Organization and International Medical Education Directory - maintained by FAIMER.

== Faculty ==
=== Core faculty ===
Post	S.NO	Name	Qualification	Designation (If Any)
P r o f e s s o r	1	Dr. Salim Khattak	MBBS FCPS	Principal
P r o f e s s o r	2	Dr. Farman Ullah	MBBS MD	
P r o f e s s o r	3	Dr. Sadiq Ur Rehman	MBBS FCPS	
P r o f e s s o r	4	Dr. Abdul Waheed	M.Phil, Ph.D (Germany)	
P r o f e s s o r	5	Dr. Asghar Kamal	MBBS FCPS	Vice Principal Hospital
P r o f e s s o r	6	Dr. Aziz Marjan	MBBS M Phil	Vice Principal Administration, Chairman IRBB
P r o f e s s o r	7	Dr. S. Mutahir Ali Shah	MBBS M.Phil	
P r o f e s s o r	8	Dr. Lal Muhammad	MBBS FCPS	Incharge Social Welfare Society KIMS
P r o f e s s o r	9	Dr. Bashir Marwat	MBBS FCPS	
P r o f e s s o r	10	Dr. Abdul Sahib Khan	MBBS FCPS	
P r o f e s s o r	11	Dr. Musarrat Jabeen	MBBS FCPS	
P r o f e s s o r	12	Dr. Mohammad Tahir Bangash	MBBS FCPS FRCS (UK)	
P r o f e s s o r	13	Dr. Fouzia Gul	MBBS DGO FCPS	
P r o f e s s o r	14	Dr. Farid Anwar	MBBS FCPS	
P r o f e s s o r	15	Dr. Syed Zafar Hussain	MBBS FCPS	
A s s o c P r o f	16	Dr. Muhammad Sajid	MBBS FCPS	
A s s o c P r o f	17	Dr. Akhtar Munir	MBBS M.Phil	
A s s o c P r o f	18	Dr. Shujaat Ali Khan	MBBS FCPS	Incharge Student Counseling Cell & Vice Chairman Literary Society
A s s o c P r o f	19	Dr. Sohail Aziz	MBBS FCPS	
A s s o c P r o f	20	Dr. Umar Hayat	MBBS MPH	
A s s o c P r o f	21	Dr. Nafeesa Tahir	MBBS FCPS	Incharge Sports & Culture Wing Female
A s s o c P r o f	22	Dr. Fahim Shah	MBBS FCPS	
A s s o c P r o f	23	Dr. Akhtar Sherin	MBBS FCPS	Incharge College Magazine, Journal & Literary Chairman
A s s o c P r o f	24	Dr. Fazal Ahmad	MBBS FCPS	
A s s o c P r o f	25	Dr. Qazi Tahir ud Din	MBBS FCPS	Incharge Sports & Culture Wing Male
A s s o c P r o f	26	Dr. Khalid Qayyum	MBBS DLO FCPS	
A s s o c P r o f	27	Dr. Arshad Firzooq	MBBS FCPS	
A s s o c P r o f	28	Dr. Noor Nasir Khattak	MBBS FCPS	
A s s i s t a n t P r o f e s s o r	29	Dr Asmat Shaheen	BDS M.Phil	
A s s i s t a n t P r o f e s s o r	30	Dr Mohammad Ashraf	MBBS FCPS	
A s s i s t a n t P r o f e s s o r	31	Dr. Tahira Atta	MBBS M.Phil	
A s s i s t a n t P r o f e s s o r	32	Dr Sajid Munir	MBBS FCPS	
A s s i s t a n t P r o f e s s o r	33	Dr. Mehmood Akhtar	MBBS FCPS	
A s s i s t a n t P r o f e s s o r	34	Dr. Tauseef Raza	MBBS Phd	
A s s i s t a n t P r o f e s s o r	35	Dr. Muhammad Alam	MBBS FCPS	
A s s i s t a n t P r o f e s s o r	36	Dr. Ameena Saba Awan	MBBS FCPS	
A s s i s t a n t P r o f e s s o r	37	Dr. Asif Iqbal	MBBS FCPS	
A s s i s t a n t P r o f e s s o r	38	Dr. Saddique Aslam	BDS FCPS	
A s s i s t a n t P r o f e s s o r	39	Dr. Shabhat Ullah Khan	BDS FCPS	Coordinator Dental Section KIMS
A s s i s t a n t P r o f e s s o r	40	Dr. Asmat Ullah	BDS FCPS	

Lecturer KIMS

- Dr. Muhammad Akbar Khan
- Dr. Fozia
- Mr. Muhammad Usman Amin
- Dr. Nowshad Asim
- Dr. Durdana
- Dr. Muhammad Noor Faraz
- Dr. Safia Bibi

- Dr. Zakia Subhan
- Dr. Azhar Ali Qaisar
- Dr. Nasra Iqbal
- Dr. Sajjad Ahmad (D.S)
- Dr. Syed Jaffar Raza (D.S)
- Dr. Muhammad Waqas Luqman (D.S)
- Dr. Shahid Ali Shah (D.S)
- Dr. Syed Umar Farooq

- Dr. Salih Jan
- Dr. Ayesha Babar
- Dr. Ahmad Ali
- Dr. Syed Ayaz Shah
- Dr. Syed Salman Shah
- Dr. Zayad Tariq
- Dr. Fazal Hanan
- Dr. Inayat Ur Rehman

=== Visiting faculty ===
1. Dr. Mehr Ali

3. Shahid Afridi

4. Dr Jaffar Iqbal, FCPS

5. Dr Mohammad Nasir, FCPS

6. Dr Khalil Asad, FCPS

7. Dr Awlia Jan, FCPS

8. Dr Mir Ahmad Khan, FCPS

9. Dr Maroof khan

== Literary Society ==
=== Introduction ===
KIMS Literary Society, a name of excellence producing active KIMSonians in today's competitive world. The basic aim of the society is to give the KIMSonians some social knowledge along with their tough academics. In this society there are a total of nine sections and two clubs:

1. Activity Section

2. Medical Section

3. Urdu Section

4. English Section

5. Pashto Section

6. Arts & Photography Section

7. Sports Section

8. Dramatic Club

9. Debate Club

10. Hiking Club

=== Literary Society 2015-16 ===
The First Literary Society was first formed in 2010. The current office bearers of the Literary Society are:

Patron In Chief: Prof Dr Salim Khattak

Literary Chairman: Assoc Prof Dr. Akhtar Sherin

Vice Literary Chairman: Assoc Prof Dr. Shujat Ali Khan

Literary Secretary & Editor in Chief: Waleed Farooq Khan (Final Year)

Staff Editors, Staff Secretaries, Chief Editors, Secretaries, Editors & Members

	Section	Names & Posts
L I T E R A R Y S O C I E T Y 2; 0; 1; 4 - 1; 5	English Section	Staff Editor: Prof Dr Musarat Jabeen; Chief Editor: Alvina Farid (Final Year); Editors: Salman Badshah (3rd Year MBBS), Danish Bilal (2nd Year MBBS), Uzma (2nd year), Maryam Malik (1st year), Hajra Ramzan (1st Year)
L I T E R A R Y S O C I E T Y 2; 0; 1; 4 - 1; 5	Medical Section	Staff Editor: Prof Dr Fozia Gul; Chief Editor: Nauman Khan (Final Year); Editors: Amna Khattak (Final Year), Fawad Khan (4th Year), Shahid Iqbal (3rd Year), Faseeh Muhammad(3rd year) Ayesha Imran (2nd year)
L I T E R A R Y S O C I E T Y 2; 0; 1; 4 - 1; 5	Arts & Photography Section	Staff Editor: Asst Prof Dr Tahira Atta; Chief Editor: Maria Jalal (Final MBBS); Editors: Mussawir Iqbal ( Finl year), Tayyab Mustajab (4th Year), Asad Ahmad, Muhammad asim (3rd Year), Nazish Khan(3rd year), Danial Ahmad (2nd year), Dure najaf (2nd year), Shehnaz Sharif (ist year)
L I T E R A R Y S O C I E T Y 2; 0; 1; 4 - 1; 5	Activity Section	Staff Editor: Prof Dr Sahib Khan; Chief Editor: Fahad Khattak (Final Year); Female Incharge: Kalsoom Bibi (Final Year); Editors: Shah Faisal (4th Year), Irsa Hadayat (4th Year), Asfandyar Khan (3rd Year MBBS), Zeeshan Nawaz (3rd Year MBBS), Kalsoom Raza (3rd Year MBBS), Shah Fahad Qamar (2nd year MBBS) Wajahat Hassan (2nd Year MBBS), Hayat Ullah (1st year)
L I T E R A R Y S O C I E T Y 2; 0; 1; 4 - 1; 5	Sports Section	Staff Editor: Asst Prof Dr Sajid Munir; Chief Editor: Jehanzeb(Final Year); Editors: Ayesha Yousaf (Final year( Nazia Bangash (Final Year), Khurram Jalil (4th Year), Salman Khan(2nd Year MBBS), Tariq Khan( 2nd year), Azeem Sikandar (1st year)
L I T E R A R Y S O C I E T Y 2; 0; 1; 4 - 1; 5	Dramatic Club	Staff Secretary: Asst Prof Dr Sabahat Ullah Khan; Secreatary: Nauman Ashraf(Final Year); Members: Laraib ( Final Year), Pir Mubassir Shah (4th Year), Sardar Alam (3rd Year MBBS), Sumbal Saeed (3rd Year MBBS),
L I T E R A R Y S O C I E T Y 2; 0; 1; 4 - 1; 5	Debate Club	Staff Secretary: Prof Dr Abdul Waheed; Secreatary: Laila Gul (Final Year); Members: Khalid Ameen (4th Year), Aftab Khan (3rd Year MBBS), hussan (3rd year), Aiman Baloch( 1st Year), Mian Danish Gul (ist year)
L I T E R A R Y S O C I E T Y 2; 0; 1; 4 - 1; 5	Pushto Section	Staff Editor: Prof Dr Lal Muhammad; Chief Editor: Salahuddin (Final Year); Editors: Adil Khan ( Final Year) Noor Jalal (3rd Year MBBS), Mudassir Ali (3rd Year MBBS), Muhammad Salman Khan (2nd year) Latif Khan( 2nd year)
L I T E R A R Y S O C I E T Y 2; 0; 1; 4 - 1; 5	Urdu Section	Staff Editor: Assoc Prof Dr Fazal Ahmad; Chief Editor: Sana Ehsan Usafxai (3rd Year) Abuzar Ghaffar (Final Year); Editors: Nabia Qamar(4thYear), Salman Ahmed (2nd year), Fatima Abid(2nd year), Humais ul Hassan Luni( ist yar), Ilyan Fatima( 4th year)
L I T E R A R Y S O C I E T Y 2; 0; 1; 4 - 1; 5	Hiking Club Club	Staff Secretary: Assoc Prof Dr Akhtar Munir; Secreatary: Asad(Final Year); Members: Bilal Qureshi (3rd Year), Shehzad (3rd Year MBBS), Aziz Ullah (3rd Year MBBS), Faseeh Muhammad (3rd Year MBBS), Usman (2nd Year MBBS)

=== Literary Secretaries ===
Post	S. No	Name	Tenure	Batch
L I T E R A R Y S E C R E T A R Y	1	Iqtidar Ahmed	2010-11	Pioneer Batch
L I T E R A R Y S E C R E T A R Y	2	Shahid Hussain	2012-13	3rd Batch
L I T E R A R Y S E C R E T A R Y	3	Saqib Naseer	2013-14	4th Batch
L I T E R A R Y S E C R E T A R Y	4	Mian Saad Ahmed	2014-15	5th Batch
L I T E R A R Y S E C R E T A R Y	5	Waleed Farooq Khan	2015-16	6th Batch

=== FARAZ (Annual KIMS Magazine) ===
The annual magazine of KIMS, Kohat was named on the Historic Poet belonging to Kohat Region that is Ahmed Faraz. So far two editions of FARAZ have been published.

== Khyber Medical University Journal ==
=== Introduction ===
"KMUJ: Khyber Medical University Journal" is the official journal of KMU, KIMS, Kohat Khyber Pakhtoonkhwa, Pakistan. KMUJ (previously published as KMJ-KUST Medical Journal) is apeer-reviewed journal and follows the uniform requirements for manuscripts submitted to biomedical journals, updated on www.icmje.org. All rights are reserved. The publisher and the members of the editorial board cannot be held responsible for errors or for any consequences arising from the use of the information contained in this journal.

KMUJ (KMJ) IS

Recognized by: Pakistan Medical and Dental Council (PMDC) and the Higher Education Commission (HEC) Pakistan

Indexed and abstracted in: Index Pakistan, WHO IMEMR Current Contents, Index Copernicus Poland

Registered with: International Serials Data System of France
Pakistan
Covered by: Pakmedinet, Directory of Open Access Journals (DOAJ), Google Scholar
Available on: EBSCO, Factiva, Gale and affiliated international databases through Asianet-Pakistan

ISSN (Print) 2305-2643 ISSN (Online) 2305-2651

KMUJ is a member of Committee on Publication Ethics (COPE) and follows the COPE guidelines regarding publication ethics and malpractices. http://www.publicationethics.org/members/kmj-kust-medical-journal

=== Editorial Board ===
Patron: Prof. Dr. Mohammad Hafizullah

Vice Chancellor, KMU

Chief Editor: Prof. Dr. Salim Khattak, Principal, KIMS

Managing Editor: Dr. Akhtar Sherin, KIMS

Members of Editorial Board:

1. Dr. Abdul Waheed, KIMS Kohat

2. Dr. Abdul Wahab Yousafzai, Islamabad

3. Dr. Ashfaq Shuaib, Canada

4. Dr. Aziz Marjan Khattak, KIMS, Kohat

5. Dr. Bader Faiyaz Zuberi, DUHS, Karachi

6. Dr. Farmanullah Wazir, KIMS, Kohat

7. Dr. Fazal Ather, WHO, Sudan

8. Dr. Jawad Ahmad, IBMS, KMU Peshawar

9. Dr. Maysaa El Sayed Zaki, Egypt

10. Dr. Muhammad Arif, KIMS, Kohat

11. Dr. Muhammad Aslam, Maj Gen (Rtd), Islamabad

12. Dr. Muhammad Salim Wazir, Abbottabad

13. Dr. Musharraf Jilani, IBMS, KMU Peshawar

14. Dr. Niaz Ali, IBMS, KMU Peshawar

15. Dr. Pei-Yi Chu, Taiwan

16. Dr. Salman Yousuf Guraya, Saudi Arabia

17. Dr. Shad Mohammad Khan, Director AA&QA, KMU Peshawar

18. Dr. Shujaat Ali Khan, KIMS, Kohat

19. Dr. Suhail Aziz Paracha, KIMS, Kohat

20. Dr. Taneem Ul Haque, Missouri, USA

21. Dr. Tariq Saeed Mufti, RMC Peshawar

22. Dr. Tasleem Akhtar, KMU, Peshawar

23. Mr. Saqib Waheed, Statistician

=== Reviewers ===
225-REVIEWERS FOR KMUJ

1. Aakif Ullah Khan, Nuclear Medicine, Peshawar

2. Aamer Shehzad, Internal Medicine, Rawalpindi

3. Aamir Ghafoor Khan, Gastroenterology, Peshawar

4. Aasim Rehman, Rheumatologist, Islamabad

5. Abdul Jabbar, Medicine/endocrinology, UAE

6. Abdul Kareem A Mahmood, Community Medicine, Iraq

7. Abdul Malik, Cardiovascular Surgery, Peshawar

8. Abdul Sahib Khan, General Surgery, Kohat

9. Abid Jameel, Oncology, Peshawar

10. Abu Ubaida Siddiqui, Anatomy, India

11. Adnan Khan, Neurology, Peshawar

12. Afshan Khattak, Pediatrics, Peshawar

13. Ahmad Ali Aurakzai, Pediatrics, UK

14. Ahmad Badar, Physiology, Saudi Arabia

15. Ahmad Fawad, Cardiology, Peshawar

16. Ahsan Numan, Neurology, Lahore

17. Alam Ibrahim Siddiqui, Neurology, Larkana

18. Ali Gholamrezanezhad, Nuclear Medicine, Radiology, Iran

19. Ali Hassan Rajput, Neurology, Saudi Arabia

20. Ali Jawa, Endocrinology, Lahore

21. Ali Madeeh Hashmi, Psychiatry, Lahore

22. Ali Zulqernain, Psychiatry, Peshawar

23. Aman Ullah Pathan, Internal Medicine, USA

24. Amanat Khan, Anesthesiology, Sialkot Cantt

25. Amber Ashraf, Cardiology/Medicine, Peshawar

26. Ambreen Kazi, Community Medicine, Karachi

27. Amer Ejaz, Dermatology, Pano Aqil

28. Amir Rashid, Biochemistry, Rawalpindi

29. Amreek Lal, Haematology, Swat

30. Ana Marusic, Anatomy, Croatia

31. Aneeqa Rashid, Physiology, Wah Cantt

32. Anjum Ilahi, Medicine/Cardiology, Islamabad

33. Arshad Iqbal, Ophthalmology, Swat

34. Asad Tamizuddin Nizami, Psychiatry, Rawalpindi

35. Asghar H. Asghar, Oncology, Karachi

36. Asher Ahmed Mashhood, Dermatology, Kohat

37. Asma Shaukat, Chemical Pathology, Bahawalpur

38. Asif Ullah Khan, Biochemistry/Bioinformatics, Peshawar

39. Asmat Ullah, Maxillofacial Surgery/Dentistry, Saudi Arabia

40. Athar Saeed Dil, Pathology, Abbottabad

41. Ayaz Khan Orthopedic Surgery, Peshawar

42. Ayaz Shah, Paediatric Neurology, UK

43. Ayesha Ahmed, Pathology, Saudi Arabia

44. Ayub Khan, Paediatric Surgery, Peshawar

45. Azhar Masood A. Farooqui, Cardiology, Karachi.

46. Aziz Ahmad, Orthosis/Prosthesis Peshawar

47. Bader Faiyaz Zuberi, Hepatology, Karachi

48. Bakhtiar Ahmad, Radiology, Saudi Arabia

49. Bashir Ahmad, Psychiatry, Peshawar

50. Bikha Ram Devrajani, Medicine, Jamshoro

51. Bissallah Ekele, Gynae/Obs, Nigeria

52. Ch. Javed Iqbal, Ophthalmology, Lahore

53. Devendra K.Gupta, Paeds Surgery, India

54. Ejaz Hassan Khan, Pathology, Peshawar

55. Fahimullah, Prosthodontics, Peshawar

56. Farooq A Rathore, Rehabilitation, Rawalpindi

57. Fazal Ather, Epidemiology, Sudan

58. Fazal Ghani Dentistry, Peshawar

59. Fazil Mohammad, Paediatrics, Mardan

60. Fida Ullah Wazir, Anatomy, D I KHAN

61. Filipa Markotic, Pharmacology, Bosnia and Herzegovina

62. Fouzia Gul, Obstetrics/Gynaecology, Kohat

63. Ganesh Dangal, Obstetrics/Gynaecology, Nepal

64. Ghanshyam Yadav, Anesthesiology, India

65. Ghias-Un-Nabi Tayyab, Medicine, Lahore.

66. Ghulam Murtaza Gondal, Medicine, Rawalpindi

67. Habibullah Khan, Internal Medicine, DI Khan

68. Hafiz Ur Rehman, Cardiology, Swat

69. Haitham Idriss, Biochemistry, Malaysia

70. Hikmatullah Jan, Cardiology, Peshawar

71. Humaira Zafar, Microbiology, Islamabad

72. Iftikhar A Jan, Paediatric surgery, UAE

73. Iftikhar Hussain Bangash, Paediatrics, UK

74. Iftikhar Qayum, Pathology/ Histopathology, Peshawar

75. Ihsanullah Wazir, Anatomy, Mardan

76. Inayat Ullah Khan, ENT, Peshawar

77. Inayatullah Khan, Paediatrics, Peshawar

78. Intekhab Alam, Internal Medicine, Peshawar

79. Iqbal Haider, Internal Medicine, Peshawar

80. Irshad Ahmad, Paediatrics, Peshawar

81. Ishtiaq Ahmed, Surgery, Rawalpindi

82. Ishtiaq Ali Khan, Surgery, Abbottabad

83. Jahangir Sarwar Khan, Surgery, Rawalpindi

84. Jamal R Al-Rawi, Community Medicine, Iraq

85. Javaid Akhtar, Psychiatry, Bannu

86. Jawad Ahmad Kundi, Maxillofacial surgery/Dentistry, Peshawar

87. Jawed Altaf Beg, Biochemistry, Karachi.

88. Joseph Drew Tobias, Anesthesiology/Critical Care, Canada

89. Kamran Hafeez, Orthopedic surgery, Karachi

90. Khurshid Khan, Neurology, Canada

91. Kiran Kamran, Anatomy, Rawalpindi

92. Kostic Sandra, Anatomy, Croatia

93. Lejla Ferhatovic, Anatomy, Croatia

94. Liaqat Ali Toori, Surgery, Peshawar

95. Liaqat Ali, Paediatrics, Peshawar

96. Livia Puljak, Medical education/Anatomy, Croatia

97. M Ali Qurashi, Radiology, Sudan

98. M Iqbal Afridi, Psychiatry, Karachi

99. Mahmood Ul Hassan, Cardiology, Peshawar

100. Mamun Al Mahtab, Hepatology, Bangladesh

101. Mansoor Ali Khan, Anatomy, Multan

102. Maqbool H Jafary, Cardiology, Karachi

103. Masood Jawaid, Surgery/ e-learning, Karachi

104. Mehr Taj Roghani, Pediatrics, Peshawar

105. Mian Mukhtar-Ul-Haq, Psychiatry, Swat

106. Mohammad Abbas Tariq Abbasi, Anaesthesia, Peshawar

107. Mohammad Imran, Paeds Surgery, Peshawar

108. Mohammad Ishaq Khattak, Internal Medicine, Peshawar

109. Mohammad Majid Paracha, Dermatology, Peshawar

110. Mohammad Salih, Gastroenterology, Islamabad

111. Mohammad Yunas Khan, Surgery, Peshawar

112. Mowadat Hussain Rana, Psychiatry, Rawalpindi.

113. Muhammad Saaiq, Plastic Surgery, Islamabad

114. Muhammad Anwar, Plastic Surgery, Rahim Yar Khan

115. Muhammad Asghar Khan, Cardiology, Peshawar

116. Muhammad Ashraf Sharif, Histopathology, Islamabad

117. Muhammad Ayub, Physiology, Abbottabad

118. Muhammad Bilal Mirza, Pediatric Surgery Faisalabad

119. Muhammad Fahim, Cardiology, Peshawar

120. Muhammad Hasnain Raza Haider, General/ Oncoplastic &Reconstructive Breast Surgery, UK

121. Muhammad Irfan, Cardiology, Peshawar

122. Muhammad Irfan, Psychiatry, Peshawar

123. Muhammad Mushtaq, Oral/Maxillofacial Surgery, Peshawar

124. Muhammad Nadeem, Neurosurgery, Islamabad

125. Muhammad Nawaz Anjum, Radiology, Lahore.

126. Muhammad Salim, Orthopedic surgery, Sialkot

127. Muhammad Sameer Qureshi, Biochemistry, Karachi

128. Muhammad Tahir Khan, Haematology, Peshawar

129. Muhammad Tariq Khan, Ophthalmology, Peshawar

130. Muhammad Yaqub Kazi, Pediatrics, Lahore.

131. Muhammad Younas, ENT, Abbottabad

132. Muhammad Zahir Shah, Community Medicine, Abbottabad

133. Muhammad Zarin Surgery, Peshawar

134. Muhammad Javed, Paediatrics, Karachi

135. Mukhtiar Baig, Biochemistry, Saudi Arabia

136. Mumtaz Khan, Surgery, Peshawar

137. Munir Akmal Lodhi, Paediatrics, Rawalpindi

138. Musarrat Jabeen, Gynae/Obs, Kohat

139. Muslim Khan, Maxillofacial surgery/Dentistry, Peshawar

140. Nadeem Akhtar, Pediatric Surgery, Islamabad

141. Naeema Utman, Gynae/Obs, Peshawar

142. Najamuddin, Oncology, Lahore

143. Nasir Saeed, Ophthalmology, Peshawar

144. Nayyar Yaqub, Internal Medicine, Rawalpindi

145. Nazia Amjad, Gyn/Obs, UAE

146. Noshin Wasim Yusuf, Pathology, Lahore

147. Nuzhat Sultana Khattak, Histopathology, Peshawar

148. Obaidullah, Plastic Surgery, Peshawar

149. Osama Ishtiaq, Endocrinology, Islamabad

150. Pei-Yi Chu, Pathology, Taiwan

151. Razia Iftikhar, Obs/Gynae, Karachi

152. Rehana Rahim, Obs/Gynae, Peshawar

153. Riaz Nasim, Pharmacology, Peshawar

154. Rizwan Aziz Memon, Cardiothoracic Surgery, Karachi

155. Rizwan Qaisar, Physiology, Kohat

156. Rizwan Taj, Psychiatry, Islamabad

157. Roshan Ali, Biochemistry, Peshawar

158. Rubina Nazli, Biochemistry, Peshawar

159. S.H. Waqar, Surgery, Islamabad

160. Saadia Ashraf, Pulmonology/Medicine, Peshawar

161. Sabir Hussain, Biochemistry, Islamabad

162. Saeed Alam, Histopathology, Islamabad

163. Saeed Farooq, Psychiatry UK

164. Safia Maqsood Siddiqui, Obs/Gynae, Nawabshah

165. Sahibzada Mahmood Noor, Dermatology, Peshawar

166. Sahibzada Nasir Mansoor, Rehabilitation Medicine, Kohat

167. Sajjad ur Rahman, Paediatrics, Qatar

168. Salah Abdelmoneim, Clinical Oncology, Egypt

169. Saleem Khan Barech, Neurology, Quetta

170. Salman Ali, Paediatrics, Rawalpindi

171. Salman Qayum, Radiology, USA

172. Salman Yousaf Guraya, Surgery, Saudi Arabia

173. Samira Ajmal, Plastic Surgery, Saudi Arabia

174. Sanaullah Jan, Ophthalmology, Peshawar

175. Sania Nishtar, Cardiology, Islamabad

176. Shabbir Akhtar, ENT, Karachi

177. Shafiq Ahmad Tariq, Pharmacology, Peshawar

178. Shah Murad Mastoi, Pharmacology, Lahore

179. Shahab Adil, Orthodontics, Peshawar

180. Shahid Abbas, Cardiology, UK

181. Shahid Ayub, Neurosurgery, Peshawar.

182. Shahid Iqbal, Clinical Psychology, Karachi

183. Shahid Mumtaz Abbasi, Internal Medicine, Rawalpindi

184. Shahzad Waseem, Ophthalmology, Rawalpindi

185. Shakeel- Ur-Rehman Khattak, Operative Dentistry, Peshawar

186. Shakir Hussain, Orthopaedics, Peshawar

187. Shehla Noor, Gyane/Obs, Abbottabad

188. Sheilla K Pinjani, Physiology, Karachi

189. Sher Bahadar Khan, Cardiology, Peshawar

190. Sher Rehman, Gastroenterology Peshawar

191. Sheraz Jamal Khan, Internal Medicine, Peshawar

192. SM Tahir, Plastic Surgery, Hyderabad

193. Sohail Ali, Psychiatry, Muzaffarabad

194. Suchitra N Pandit, Gynecology, India

195. Suraya Zafar, Radiology, Multan

196. Syed Ahmer, Psychiatry, Karachi

197. Syed Sadiq Shah, Cardiology, Peshawar

198. Syed Salahuddin Babur, Psychiatry, Bahawalpur

199. Syed Shahid Habib, Physiology, Saudi Arabia

200. Syed Tahir Shah, Cardiology, Peshawar

201. Syed Wasim Akhtar, Neurology, Karachi

202. Syeda Ayesha Zafar, Neurology, Peshawar

203. Tahmeedullah, Plastic Surgery, Peshawar

204. Tajvur P Saber Rheumatology/Medicine, UK

205. Tariq Nadeem, Paediatrics, Kohat

206. Tariq Saeed Mufti, Surgery Peshawar

207. Tariq Wahab Khanzada, Surgery, Oman

208. Tazeen Saeed Ali, Community Medicine, Karachi

209. Tehniyat Ishaq, Gyn/Obs, Peshawar

210. Tej K. Kaul, Anaesthesiology, India

211. Tomislav Franic, Psychiatry, Croatia

212. Ukasha Dukht, Ophthalmology, United Kingdom

213. Umberin Gul Najeeb, Medicine, Canada

214. Usman Rafique, ENT, Kharian

215. Wajid Ali Akhunzada, Psychiatry, Peshawar

216. Zafar Ali, Medicine/Neurology, Peshawar

217. Zafar Iqbal, Ophthalmology, Peshawar

218. Zafar Iqbal, Pulmonology, Peshawar

219. Zaheer Ahmed Memon, Anatomy, Hyderabad

220. Zahid Anwar Khan, Radiology, Saudi Arabia

221. Zahoor Aslam Khan, Cardiology, Rawalpind

222. Zakaullah Malik, Orthopaedic Surgery, Rawalpindi

223. Zaman Shah, Ophthalmology, Peshawar

224. Zeeshan Khan, Orthopaedic Surgery, UK

225. Zia Ud-Din Afridi, Surgery, Peshawar

== KIMS Alumni Association ==
=== Introduction ===
A new breakthrough was made at the 7th anniversary of KIMS, 6 April 2013. A new college inaugurated in the historical city of Kohat with the name of KUST institute of medical sciences later become KMU institute of medical sciences (KMU-IMS) after affiliation with Khyber medical university.

To repeat the same story, the graduates of first two batches decided to organise a platform from where they can render much more for the advancement and development of the college at the national and international levels so they laid down the foundation of KIMS Alumni Association (KAA) at the 7th anniversary of KIMS.

Organizational structure:

The following shall be the elected office bearers of the Association;

A. President

B. Vice President

C. General Secretary

D. Joint Secretary

E. Finance Secretary

F. Information and Public Relations Secretary

G. Social Welfare Secretary

Executive committee:

The executive committee shall consist of following;

A. All the office bearers shall be the Ex- Officio members

B. The previous outgoing president and the general secretary

C. The principal of the college

D. A faculty member of the college, appointed by the college authorities through a notification, as coordinator

E. Eight members to be elected in Annual General Meeting of the Association

=== Aims and objectives ===
The aims and objectives of the association shall be:

A. To promote social contact between senior alumni, old boys, current students and faculty of the college in collaboration with the college authorities.

B. To promote good fellowship among all members of the association.

C. To provide amenities of good social and professional life for all members.

D. To encourage, strengthen and maintain the high traditions and good name of the college.

E. To cooperate with the State of Pakistan, the college and other institutions in spreading education and enlightenment among the people of Pakistan with special focus on the Khyber Pakhtunkhwa.

F. To provide emergency response programs during natural disasters.

=== Current office bearer ===
President: Dr Iqtidar Ahmed Roghani

Vice President: Dr. Sohail Wisal

General Secretary: Dr Kashif Ullah

Joint Secretary: Dr Abid Imran Khattak

Finance Secretary: Dr Shariq Aman

Members: Dr Zain Khan Tareen

Dr Sohail Ahmed Khattak

Dr Fida Mohammad Khan

Information and Public Relation Secretary: Dr Amir Ali Khan

Members: Dr Abbas Khan

Dr Aminullah Shah

Dr Mansoor Ahmed Bangash

Social Welfare Secretary: Dr Mian Mohammad Asif

Members: Dr Abdul Baqi Wazir

Dr Tayyab Anwar

Executive Committee:

1. Chairman

Principal KIMS

2. Coordinator

Dr Akhtar Sherin

3. Dr. Munir Ahmed

4. Dr. Mohammad Imran

5. Dr. Fazal hayat

6. Dr. Tauseef Nisar

7. Dr. Atiq ur Rehman

8. Dr. Saifullah

9. Dr. Abdullah

10. Dr. Mukhtar
