= Nathan Weiss Graduate College =

The Nathan Weiss Graduate College is the graduate college of Kean University in the U.S. state of New Jersey. The college is located on Kean's East Campus in Hillside, New Jersey and is a comprehensive educational institution that offers various majors for master's degrees and doctorates and fosters the development of ethical and effective leadership in the professions, taking into account the increasingly complex, diverse, and technological nature of American and global society. Nathan Weiss Graduate College is named for a former president of Kean College of New Jersey.
