= Ayub Medical College =

Public medical institute in Abbottabad, Pakistan

Ayub Medical College ایوب طبی کالج
- Motto: To Serve The Ailing Humanity بیمار انسانیت کی خدمت کرنا
- Established: 1979
- Affiliations: Khyber Medical University; Pakistan Medical and Dental Council; College of Physicians and Surgeons Pakistan; Pakistan Nursing Council; Higher Education Commission (Pakistan)
- Dean: Prof Dr Muhammad Asif Karim
- Faculty: 212
- Students: 1500
- Undergraduates: 1350
- Postgraduates: 150
- Location: Abbottabad, Pakistan; 34°12′17″N 73°14′00″E
- Campus: 54 hectares (130 acres) Urban
Colours
- Website: www.ayubmed.edu.pk

Ayub Medical College (Urdu, Hindko: ایوب طبی کالج, Pashto: د ايوب طب پوهنځی, or AMC) is a public medical education institute located in Abbottabad, Pakistan. It is one of the medical colleges affiliated to Khyber Medical University.

== Recognized college ==
Ayub Medical College is a recognized college by the Higher Education Commission of Pakistan.

== History ==
In the late 1960s, a government study concluded that more medical colleges were needed in Pakistan to improve medical education, research, and healthcare in the country. In particular, the Khyber Pakhtunkhwa province was in dire need of health reforms - a decision was thus made in 1972 to construct another medical college outside of Peshawar region.

In 1975, four cities in the province were shortlisted for the site of the new college; Abbottabad, Dera Ismail Khan, Mingora and Chitral. A decision was made in 1978 to build the new college in Abbottabad and on 9 May 1979, classes started at Ayub Medical College.

The first batch consisting of 100 students (class of 1984) was accommodated at the Education Extension Centre, while the present college campus and teaching hospital were later on constructed north of the town. On 30 December 1990, the new campus opened its doors to students and faculty. Abbottabad District Headquarters Hospital remained affiliated to Ayub Medical College upon opening of Ayub Teaching Hospital in 1998. AMC was named after former President Ayub Khan, who hailed from nearby Haripur. The first Principal of AMC was Dr. Abdul Jamil Khan. Today AMC hosts one of the largest medical college campuses in Pakistan.

On 20 December 2023, Prime Minister Anwaar ul Haq Kakar, during a speech to the 46th annual meeting of Association of Physicians of Pakistani Descent of North America (APPNA), announced that AMC would be upgraded to a medical university.

== Academics ==
The Bachelor of Medicine and Bachelor of Surgery is awarded to students after five professional years of theoretical and clinical training. AMC features most of the clinical and basic science departments. Annually, AMC educates and trains approximately 1000 medical students along with 200 resident physicians and fellows. In 2010, AMC introduced Community Oriented Medical Education (COME), a form of problem-based learning in a bid to convert from the annual system to a semester system. However, the transition has been slow and faced a lot of problems regarding its acceptance.

=== Undergraduate programs ===
- Bachelor of Medicine & Bachelor of Surgery (MBBS)

=== Postgraduate programs ===
- Fellow of College of Physicians & Surgeons Pakistan (FCPS)
- Member of College of Physicians & Surgeons Pakistan (MCPS)

== Recognition ==
AMC is fully recognized by the Pakistan Medical and Dental Council (PMDC). The College of Physicians and Surgeons of Pakistan has recognized many of its departments for post-graduate training in Medicine, Surgery, Obstetrics & Gynaecology and Pathology. The Royal College of Obstetricians and Gynaecologists of Britain has granted recognition to the Department of Obstetrics and Gynaecology at AMC for clinical training of MRCOG candidates.

== Departments ==
- Basic sciences
  - Anatomy
  - Physiology
  - Biochemistry
  - Pharmacology
  - Forensic Medicine
  - Pathology
  - Community Medicine
  - Medical Education
- Medicine and allied departments
  - General Medicine
  - Pediatrics
  - Behavioural Sciences
  - Cardiology
  - Dermatology
  - Neurology
  - Psychiatry
  - Radiotherapy
  - Urology
  - Social & Preventive Medicine
- Surgery and allied departments
  - General Surgery
  - Obstetrics and Gynaecology
  - Orthopedics
  - Ophthalmology
  - Otorhinolaryngology
  - Cardiac Surgery
  - Thoracic Surgery
  - Pediatric Surgery
  - Anesthesiology
  - Neurosurgery
  - Radiology

=== Attached hospitals ===
- Ayub Teaching Hospital (1998–present)
- District Headquarters Hospital, Abbottabad (1979–1998)

== Campus ==
The 133-acre (54 ha) Ayub Medical Complex campus consists of a medical school, teaching hospital, nursing school, dental school and paramedical institute with supporting amenities for students and staff. The campus is also home to the Abbottabad CPSP Regional Centre and the Institute of Nuclear Medicine, Oncology and Radiotherapy (INOR).

=== Medical school ===
The medical school building contains four lecture halls, laboratories and museums. The lecture halls are equipped with audiovisual teaching aid.

=== Nursing school ===
The Ayub School of Nursing is the nursing education unit at AMC. However, most teaching and training occurs at Ayub Teaching Hospital.

=== Library ===
The library provides various learning resources for both students and faculty. There are three main sections of the library - the main hall, a reading room, and a self-learning resource center. The main hall houses over 10,000 medical books along with various medical journals. The self-learning resource center consists of 20 computers with access to the digital library of Higher Education Commission.

=== Accommodations ===
The campus also provides hostel accommodation for up to 500 medical students, 300 internees, 100 nurses, and a colony comprising 10 flats for non-teaching staff. The hostels are named after famous Pakistani personalities and regions.

- Quaid-e-Azam Hostel
- Fatima Jinnah Hostel
- Allama Iqbal Hostel
- Ayub Khan Hostel
- Khyber Hostel
- Doctors Hostel

=== Sports complex ===
A sports complex including the PCB-AMC stadium for cricket and hockey ground has also been built on the campus.

== Research ==
=== Journal of Ayub Medical College ===
The Journal of Ayub Medical College has been published by the Faculty of Ayub Medical College since January 1988. It is a peer-reviewed journal and the first medical journal available with illustrations free online.

== Administration ==
- Dean and CEO: Prof. Dr. Muhammad Asif Karim
- Medical Director: Prof. Dr. Alam Zeb khan Swati
- Hospital Director: Dr. Athar Lodhi
- Associate Dean (Undergraduate): Dr. Saima Gillani
- Associate Dean (Research): Prof. Dr. Ruqiyya Sultana
- Associate Dean (postgraduate): Dr. Nasir Jameel

Former Principals/Deans

- A. J. Khan (1979–1986)
- Mujahid Akbar (1986–1992)
- Syed Jamil-ur-Rehman (1992–1994)
- Muhammad Abdul Khaliq (1994–1999)
- Khurshid Khattak (1999–2002)
- Muhammad Aftab (2002–2003)
- Nazir Ahmed (2003)
- Muhammad Ayub (2003–2006)
- Abdul Rashid (2006–2007)
- Jaffar Khan (2007)
- Tariq Saeed Mufti (2007)
- Syed Humayun Shah (2008)
- Muhammad Ayub (2008–2011)
- Shahid Sultan (2011–2016)
- Prof. Dr. Azizun Nisa (2016–2018)
- Prof. Dr. Salma Kundi (2018)
- Prof. Dr. Umer Farooq (2018–2024)

== Student life ==
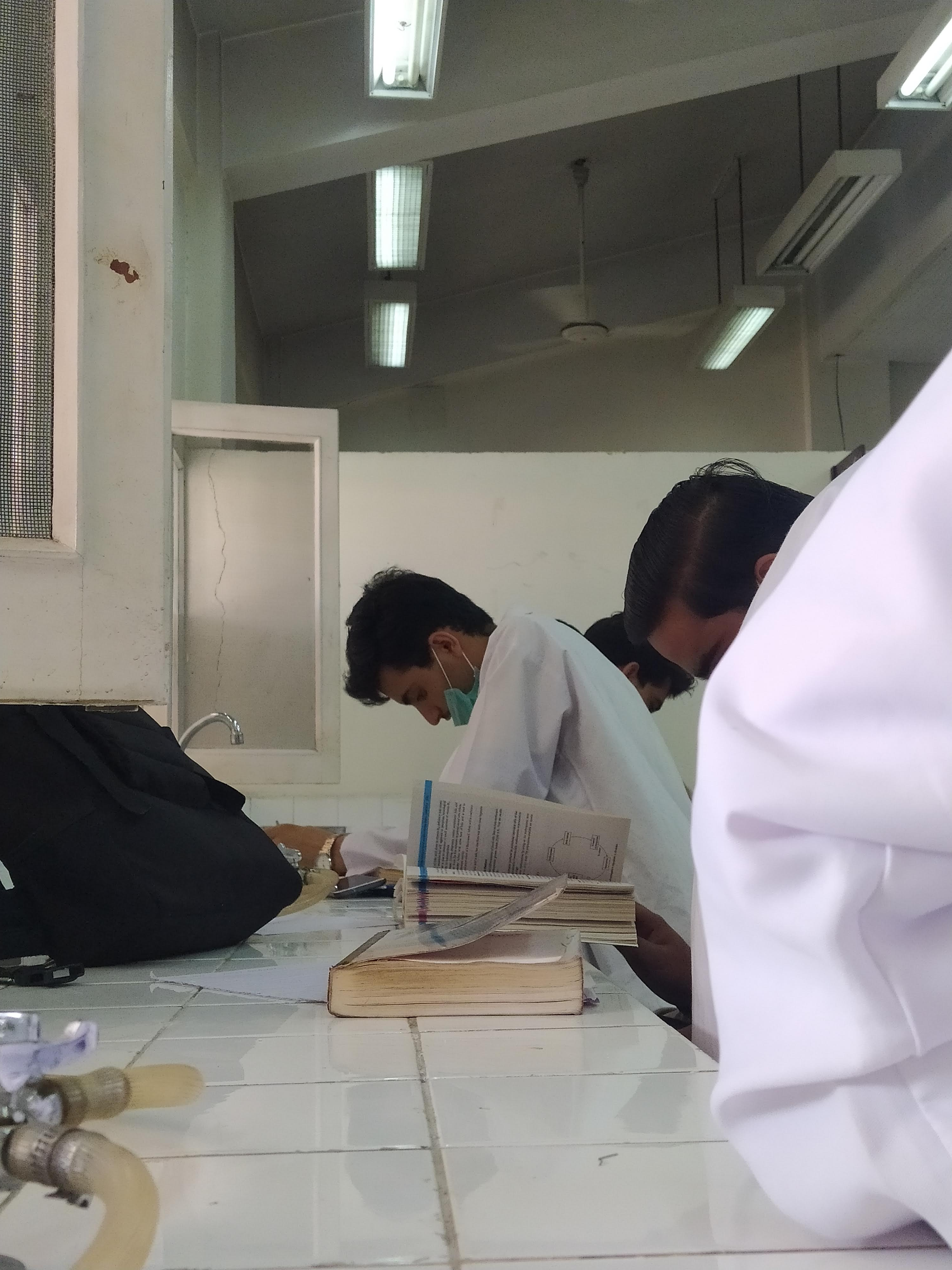
Students at Junior Conservation Lab AMC

Students and alumni of the college are referred to as Ayubians. Students actively partake in clubs and societies within the college. Some societies which are medical-oriented are governed by professors along with an associate society master who serves as "academic advisers" to students. Other societies are strictly governed by students. Due to its unique "crossroad" location, Ayub Medical College has one of the most ethnically diverse campuses in Pakistan with students from various backgrounds including, Balochs, Pashtuns, Hindkowans, Chitralis, Punjabis, Saraikis, Kashmiris, Kalash, Burusho, Shina and Baltis.

=== Publications ===
Karakoram is the annual college magazine published at Ayub Medical College and maintained by the Ayubian Literary Society.

=== Alumni ===
- Anam Najam, physician and psychiatrist
- Ayub Medical College Alumni Association of North America
- AMC Alumni Association Europe
- Misbah Ullah, Pediatrician, Ayub Medical College Alumni, works at Khyber Teaching Hospital

== See also ==
- Ayub Teaching Hospital
- Institute of Nuclear Medicine, Oncology and Radiotherapy
- Ayub School of Nursing
- Education in Pakistan
