= Khyber College of Dentistry =

Public sector dental college located in Peshawar, Pakistan

Coordinates: 33.9995°N 71.4836°E

- د خیبر د غاښونو پوهنځی
- Motto: Service to Humanity
- Type: Public
- Established: 1964
- Founder: Ahmad Iqbal
- Affiliations: PMDC; KMU; HEC
- Dean: Prof.Dr Syed Nasir Shah
- Location: Peshawar, Pakistan
- Campus: Urban
- Colors: Blue and White
- Website: https://www.kcd.edu.pk/

Khyber College of Dentistry (abbreviated as KCD) is a public sector dental college located in Peshawar, in the Khyber Pakhtunkhwa province of Pakistan. It is the oldest dental educational institution in the province, established in 1964, and considered a prestigious dental institute in Pakistan.

== History ==
Khyber College of Dentistry was established in 1964 as a department of dentistry in the pathology block of Khyber Medical College, with the first batch graduating in 1968. On 9 September 1978, this department was shifted to a new building called "Oral & Dental Hospital, Department of Dentistry" and in 1988 an Oral & Maxillofacial Ward and Operation Theater was added for indoor patients.

On 11 January 1990, the Department of Dentistry was upgraded to the status of a College by the then Chief Minister, Aftab Ahmad Khan Sherpao while presiding over the inaugural function of the Silver Jubilee of the Department of Dentistry. In 2009 the department of Oral and Maxillofacial Surgery was shifted to a new purpose-built building. In 2010, R&D Cell, Pathology Laboratory and a new digital library were established.

A seven-story building was completed and inaugurated in 2023 for extension of various departments. The new building has a daycare center, IT Cell, library, masjid, store, lecture theatres, offices, dental laboratories, multi-purpose hall, examination hall and a conference hall. The chairman of the Board of Governors announced the establishment of an emergency department at the college on 19 December 2023.

== Accredited institute ==
The college is fully accredited and recognized by the Pakistan Medical and Dental Council, the College of Physicians and Surgeons Pakistan and also has access to the HEC Digital Library.

== Journal ==
The college has one peer review journal, called Journal of Khyber College of Dentistry. It is recognized by HEC and indexed in WHO Index Medicus. It is the only dental education institution in Pakistan to have its own journal.

== Academic programs ==
- Bachelor of Dental Surgery (BDS)
- Diploma in Clinical Dentistry (DCD)
- MCPS
- FCPS

It is also the first dental institute in the country to offer post-graduate training in periodontology.

== Departments ==
- Oral and Maxillofacial Surgery
- Prosthodontics
- Orthodontics
- Operative Dentistry
- Paediatric Dentistry
- Periodontology
- Oral Medicine
- Science of Dental Materials
- Preventive and Community Dentistry
- Oral Biology/Anatomy
- Oral Pathology
