= Khyber Girls Medical College =

Khyber Girls Medical College خیبر خواتین طبی کالج
- Motto: Quest for Excellence
- Type: Public/Government
- Established: 2004
- Affiliations: Khyber Medical University
- Principal: Zahid Aman
- Location: Peshawar, Pakistan
- Campus: sub-urban
- Website: kgmc.edu.pk

Khyber Girls Medical College (Urdu: خیبر خواتین طبی کالج, Pashto: د خیبر ښځو طب پوهنځی) (KGMC) is the first public sector medical college for girls in Khyber Pakhtunkhwa which came into existence in May 2004 as a women's-only campus of KMC Peshawar. It was declared as an independent college in December 2005, and is recognized by Pakistan Medical & Dental Council in December 2008.

== History ==
Initially, this project was launched in the name 'Girl campus of Khyber Medical College' with the first batch of 50 students during the academic session 2004-05. Later, the then Chief Minister Khyber Pakhtunkhwa Akram Khan Durrani announced the conversion of 'Girls campus of KMC Peshawar' as an independent medical college with the name of 'Khyber Girls Medical College' with effect from 8 December 2005. KGMC is ranked as one of the top medical college of Khyber Pakhtunkhwa.
