= Koppal Institute of Medical Sciences =

Koppal Institute of Medical Sciences ಕೊಪ್ಪಳ ವೈದ್ಯಕೀಯ ವಿಜ್ಞಾನಗಳ ಸಂಸ್ಥೆ, ಕೊಪ್ಪಳ
- Type: Government
- Established: 2013; 13 years ago
- Affiliations: Rajiv Gandhi University of Health Sciences
- Principal: Dr. Raghavendra Babu Y. P.
- Dean: Dr. Vijayanath Itagi
- Location: Koppal, Karnataka, India; 15.352150°N 76.184513°E
- Campus: District Hospital, Koppal - 585105
- Website: kimskoppal.karnataka.gov.in/english

Koppal Institute of Medical Sciences is a government medical college established in 2013 and is located in Koppal, Karnataka. The college accommodates 150 undergraduate MBBS seats and 47 postgraduate seats. The medical college and the medical courses are recognized by National Medical Commission.

== Admissions ==
=== Undergraduate courses ===
==== M.B.B.S. ====
The college offers a four-and-a-half-year M.B.B.S. course with a one-year compulsory rotating internship in affiliated hospitals.

== Departments ==
- ANATOMY
- ANESTHESIA
- BIOCHEMISTRY
- COMMUNITY MEDICINE
- DENTISTRY
- EAR, NOSE AND THROAT
- GENERAL MEDICINE
- GENERAL SURGERY
- MEDICINE
- MICROBIOLOGY
- OBSTETRICS AND GYNAECOLOGY
- OPHTHALMOLOGY
- ORTHOPEDICS
- PAEDIATRIC
- PATHOLOGY
- PHARMACOLOGY
- PHYSIOLOGY
- PSYCHIATRY
- RADIOLOGY
- SKIN & VENEREAL DISEASES
- TUBERCULOSIS AND CHEST
