= Frederick County Public Schools =

Frederick County Public Schools may refer to

- Frederick County Public Schools (Maryland)
- Frederick County Public Schools (Virginia)
