= Fayette County Public Schools =

Fayette County Public Schools can refer to:

- Fayette County School System (Georgia)
- Fayette County Public Schools (Kentucky), part of a consolidated city-county government with Lexington
- Fayette County Schools (West Virginia), in Fayette County, West Virginia
