= UNLV Graduate College =

Coordinates: 36.1074°N 115.1435°W

- Type: Public
- Established: 1964; 62 years ago
- Parent institution: University of Nevada, Las Vegas
- Dean: Kate Hausbeck Korgan
- Location: Las Vegas, Nevada, U.S.
- Website: unlv.edu/graduatecollege

University of Nevada, Las Vegas (UNLV) Graduate College supports more than 4,500 graduate students in more than 150 graduate certificate, master's, specialist and doctoral programs offered at the University of Nevada, Las Vegas (UNLV).

== History ==
The UNLV Graduate College was founded as the Division of Graduate Studies in 1964 by Nevada Southern University (UNLV's name prior to 1969). It was not until 1972 that the Division of Graduate Studies became the Graduate College as it is known today.

== Facts and figures ==
UNLV has more than 5,000 graduate and professional students; 150 graduate degree programs, including more than 50 doctoral and professional programs; 1,000 full-time graduate faculty members; and 1,000 graduate assistants.

== Academics ==
The UNLV Graduate College offers an array of degree programs ranging from accounting to water resources management.
