= Al-Imtiaz Academy =

School in Abbottabad, Pakistan

Location
- Abbottabad; Pakistan

Information
- Established: 1986; 39 years ago
- Founder: Imtiaz Nawaz
- Enrollment: c.1000

Al-Imtiaz Academy is a school in Abbottabad, Pakistan. It consists of three branches, a girls' high school and college, a boys' high school and an elementary school.

The academy was founded by Imtiaz Nawaz (a grandmother-in-law of Canadian singer Dawud Wharnsby) in 1986, and now has about 1000 students.
