= Hayatabad Medical Complex Peshawar =

Hayatabad Medical Complex
- Location in Pakistan Hayatabad Medical Complex Peshawar (Pakistan)

Geography
- Location: Peshawar, Khyber Pakhtunkhwa, Pakistan
- Coordinates: 33°59′N 71°27′E

Organisation
- Type: Teaching
- Affiliated university: Khyber Girls Medical College

Services
- Emergency department: Yes
- Beds: 1280

History
- Founded: 1992

Links
- Website: Hayatabad Medical Complex
- Lists: Hospitals in Pakistan

The Hayatabad Medical Complex (Pashto: د حیات آباد طبي کمپلیکس ) is a large medical complex and hospital located in the Hayatabad suburb of Peshawar in Khyber Pakhtunkhwa, Pakistan. The second largest hospital in the city, it is a medical postgraduate training centre. The hospital provides medical and surgical specialties in the fields of Optometry, Cardiology, Thoracic Surgery, Paediatrics, Physiotherapy, Plastic Surgery, Psychiatry, as well as Dentistry, Dermatology, Orthopedic and Spine Surgery, PEADS, Pulmonology, and Human Nutrition. Apart from the western parts of Peshawar, the hospital also serves patients coming from surrounding regions and neighboring Afghanistan for treatment.

== History ==
The construction of the hospital started in 1990 and was completed in 1992 with a total expenditure of US$17.83 million and 520 beds.

In 2017, a Burns and Trauma Centre was established in the hospital.

== See also ==
- List of hospitals in Pakistan
- Lady Reading Hospital Peshawar
- Khyber Teaching Hospital Peshawar
