= Higher Education, Archives and Libraries Department (KPK) =

Department of Government of Khyber Pakhtunkhwa

Agency overview
- Formed: 2002; 24 years ago
- Preceding agency: Department of Education
- Type: Provincial department
- Jurisdiction: Khyber Pakhtunkhwa (KPk)
- Ministers responsible: Special Assistant to CM KPK; Kamran Khan Bangash
- Agency executive: Dawood Khan, Secretary
- Child agencies: Directorate of Higher Education; Directorate of Archives and Libraries; Directorate of Commerce and Management Education
- Website: hed.kp.gov.pk
- Agency ID: HED

The Higher Education, Archives and Libraries Department, commonly known as the Higher Education Department or HED, is a department of the government of Khyber Pakhtunkhwa responsible for record keeping, policymaking, regulation and administration of higher education institutions and libraries in Khyber Pakhtunkhwa. Currently, the department administers three directorates along with seven autonomous/semi-autonomous bodies. Kamran Khan Bangash currently heads the department as Special Assistant to CM KPK.

== History ==
In July 2001, the Department of Education was restructured into the Elementary & Secondary Education Department and the Higher Education, Archives and Libraries Department.

== Directorates ==
The Higher Education, Archives and Libraries Department comprises three directorates.

=== Directorate of Higher Education ===
The Directorate of Higher Education, HDE, is a sub department of the Higher Education, Archives and Libraries Department, KPK, responsible for education, learning and related services for students, teaching and non-teaching staff, serving in public and private higher education institutions in Khyber Pakhtunkhwa.

==== History ====
The Directorate of Higher Education KP was established in 1979.

=== Directorate of Archives & Libraries ===
The Directorate of Archives and Libraries, Khyber Pakhtunkhwa, is attached to the Department of Higher Education, Archives & Libraries Department, responsible for the collection and protection of official records and historical research; restoration of all the Khyber Pakhtunkhwa records; and the administration, development and maintenance of public libraries in Khyber Pakhtunkhwa.

==== History ====
In August 1946, on the recommendation of the Indian Historical and Record Commission, a separate Directorate of Archives (then the Central Record Office) was set up in the Victoria Memorial Hall, NWFP (now Peshawar Museum, Khyber Pakhtunkhwa). Prof. S. M. Jaffar was its first custodian. In 1973, the department was shifted to the Divisional Council Hall, Shahi Bagh, Peshawar, and was shifted to the Benevolent Fund Building in 1985. In 1992, it was shifted to its current location.
In 1990, the directorate was renamed as the Directorate of Archives and Libraries and was given responsibility of libraries.
