= Dental pharmacology =

Dental pharmacology is the study of drugs used to treat conditions of the oral cavity.

Some of these drugs include antibiotics, analgesics, anti-inflammatory drugs and anti-periodontitis agents.
