= Lady Reading Hospital =

Largest hospital in Khyber Pakhtunkhwa, Pakistan

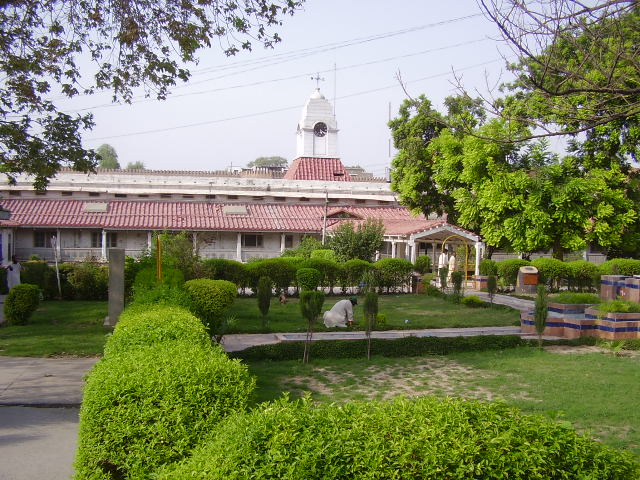

Geography
- Location: Peshawar, Khyber Pakhtunkhwa, Pakistan
- Coordinates: 34°01′N 71°34′E

Organisation
- Affiliated university: College of Physicians and Surgeons of Pakistan Pakistan Medical and Dental Council Post Graduate Medical Institute Peshawar

Services
- Beds: 1800+

History
- Opened: 1924

Links
- Website: lrh.edu.pk
- Lists: Hospitals in Pakistan

Lady Reading Hospital (LRH) (Pashto: ریډینګ روغتوند لیډي) is a public sector tertiary care teaching hospital located in Peshawar, Khyber Pakhtunkhwa, Pakistan. Established in 1924, the hospital is affiliated with Khyber Medical College and serves as one of the principal referral and training centers for medical education and specialized healthcare in the province. It provides a wide range of clinical, surgical, and diagnostic services and receives patients from across Khyber Pakhtunkhwa, the former Federally Administered Tribal Areas, and neighboring regions of Afghanistan.

== History ==
Established in 1924 and named after Lady Reading, the hospital is located just 200 meters (220 yards) south of the Grand Trunk Road, behind the historical Qila Balahisar. The Masjid Mahabat Khan mosque, Ander Shehr Bazaar, Qissa Khwani Bazaar and Khyber Bazaar are across the road. LRH is just outside the historical wall in the jurisdiction of the cantonment board. Later on, the hospital was given the status of District Headquarters hospital with 150 beds, and in 1930 it was a 200-bed hospital. Brierly Ward was added in 1936, named after Lt. Col. Sir Charles Brierly, Chief Medical Officer of NWFP (IMS) and Inspector General of Civil Hospitals. Khan Bahadur Abdul Samad Khan became the first medical superintendent of the hospital. Muhammad Ayaz Khan was appointed the first administrator of the hospital in 1973. This hospital became affiliated with Khyber Medical College in 1955 with medical, surgical, ENT, eye, and TB wards.

== Departments ==
The hospital catchment population includes patients from all over the province, erstwhile tribal areas and Afghanistan as well. Currently, Lady Reading Hospital is serving the largest number of patients in the region having a capacity of 1790+ beds and 33 different Medical Specialties.

Prominent are:

=== Out Patient Department ===
The out patient departments deals with an average of 4500 patients daily and has over 26 clinics.

=== Emergency Department ===
It is the largest trauma center of Khyber Pakhtunkhwa dealing with 3000 to 4000 patients daily. It also has its own system of triaging, known as the LRH Model Triaging System.

=== Medical Departments ===
- Cardiology
- Dermatology
- Endocrinology
- Gastroenterology
- Medicine
- Nephrology
- Neurology
- Peadiatrics
- Pulmonology
- Rheumatology
- Psychiatry

=== Surgical Departments ===
- Burn & Plastic Surgery
- Cardiovascular
- ENT
- Gynae
- Neurosurgery
- Orthopedic
- Ophthamology
- Peads Surgery
- Surgical
- Peadiatric Cardiac Surgery
- Urology
- Maxillofacial Surgery

=== Clinical ===
- Anesthesia
- Pathology
- Pharmacy Services
- Physiotherapy & Rehabilitation
- Radiology

== COVID-19 ==
Continuing its practice in serving the public, the institution has served again as a major frontline. In the peak COVID-19 situation, the hospital had catered for more than 5000 COVID-19 patients, among the largest number of COVID-19 patients at any hospital in Pakistan, with best possible care.

The Medical facility included around 500 dedicated COVID-19 beds.

During the COVID-19 pandemic, supplemental medical oxygen was a primary component of patient treatment. Healthcare systems maintained oxygen supplies across successive waves of infection.

== See also ==
- Khyber Teaching Hospital Peshawar
- Hayatabad Medical Complex Peshawar
