= Khyber Teaching Hospital =

Hospital in Peshawar, Pakistan

Coordinates: 33°59′47″N 71°29′11″E

Khyber Teaching Hospital KTH د خیبر تدريسي روغتون خیبر تدریسی ہسپتال

Geography
- Location: Peshawar, Khyber Pakhtunkhwa, Pakistan

Organisation
- Type: Teaching Hospital
- Affiliated university: Khyber Medical College; Khyber College of Dentistry

Services
- Standards: ISO 9001
- Emergency department: Casualty 100 Beds with a major revamp in 2019
- Beds: 1600

History
- Former names: Ayub Teaching Hospital; Hayat Sherpao Teaching Hospital
- Founded: 1976

Links
- Website: Official Website
- Lists: Hospitals in Pakistan

Khyber Teaching Hospital, also known as "Sherpao Hospital" (Pashto: د خیبر تدريسي روغتون, Urdu: خیبر تدریسی ہسپتال abbreviated as KTH), is a university hospital and the primary teaching affiliate of Khyber Medical College.

KTH lies on the historic route that links up to the historic Khyber Pass. This is one of the largest hospitals in the country. As a tertiary health-care facility, KTH serves as a major referral center in the region. This facility serves a large population, both domestic and foreign, in the north west region of Pakistan as well as in north eastern Afghanistan.

== History ==
Khyber Teaching Hospital, formerly Hayat Sherpao Teaching Hospital, was established in 1976 as a training and biomedical research facility for the medical students of the north western region of Pakistan, as well as the teaching affiliate of Khyber Medical College.

The hospital was commissioned in 1976 for the development of a scientific and research base of the Province. It is shaped like an octagon with extensions of Y-shaped wings that form a wide number of its inpatient units. The present capacity of beds is 1600, with incremental increases every few years.

A major revamp and reconstruction of its emergency facilities had begun in 2013. Restructuring and refurbishing of the entire hospital had been completed in 2021 with the establishment of a new Outpatients Department. This includes 16 procedures rooms for outpatients, pathology and diagnostic services, pharmacy, radiology, blood bank, laundry, and central sterile services department.

Under ground passage and the over-head bridge have made safer the smooth flow of patients and students between KMC, IRNUM and KTH.

Khyber Medical College, the first medical school of the province, came into existence in February 1954. It necessitated the creation of a Teaching Hospital. Initially Lady Reading Hospital Peshawar, the then district headquarters hospital, was utilized for the purpose. But sooner the need was felt to have a teaching hospital in close proximity to the college. Plan for such a hospital was initiated in 1958 and the idea finally materialized, when General Mohammad Musa, the Governor West Pakistan, laid the foundation stone of Khyber Teaching Hospital (at that time named as Ayub Teaching Hospital) on 30 November 1967.

School of Nursing Khyber Teaching Hospital also works as an allied institution with KTH for training of student nurses since inception of the institution.

== Management Council (MC) – KTH/KMC/KCD ==
- Prof. Dr. Mahmud Aurangzeb Dean, Khyber Medical College (KMC)
- Dr. Sajjad Ullah Dawar.Hospital Director, KTH
- Prof. Dr. Mahmud Aurangzeb Principal, Khyber College of Dentistry (KCD)
- Mr. Abdul Waheed Director Finance, KTH, KMC and KCD
- DR Seema Samin Manager Pharmacy Of KTH
- Chairpersons of clinical departments

=== Medical and allied ===
- General Medicine: Dr. Hamza Ali Khan (Chairman & Clinical Lead)
- Cardiology: Prof. Dr. Amber Ashraf (Chairperson)
- Dermatology: Dr. Mehran Khan (Chairman)
- Endocrinology: Dr. Suleman Elahi Malik (Chairperson)
- Gastroenterology: Dr. Sheema Khan (Chairperson)
- Nephrology: Prof. Dr. Amer Azhar (Chairman)
- Neurology: Dr. Irfan Ullah Khattak (Head of Department)
- Oncology: Dr. Muhammad Tariq (Assistant Professor)
- Pediatrics: Prof. Dr. Sabahat Amir (Chairperson)
- Physical Therapy: Dr. Fazal Rehman PT (In-charge)
- Psychiatry: Dr. Imran Khan (Chairman)
- Pulmonology: Prof. Dr. Saadia Ashraf (Chairperson)
- Rheumatology: Dr. Alam Zeb Yousafzai (Chairperson)

=== Surgical and allied ===
- General Surgery: Prof. Dr. Mah Muneer Khan (Chairperson)
- ENT (Otorhinolaryngology): Dr. Muhammad Hafeez (Chairman)
- Neurosurgery: Dr. Sajjad Ullah Dawar (Chairperson)
- Obstetrics and Gynecology: Dr. Mahjabina S. Ghayur (Chairperson)
- Ophthalmology: Dr. Imran Ahmad (Chairperson)
- Orthopedics: Dr. Muhammad Siraj (Chairman)
- Pediatric Surgery: Dr. Muhammad Imran (Chairman & Clinical Lead)
- Pediatric Urology: Dr. Tariq Ahmad (Departmental Lead)
- Plastic Surgery: Dr. Muhammad Haider (Associate Professor)
- Urology: Dr. Hazrat Ullah (Chairperson)

=== Diagnostic and emergency ===
- Accident and Emergency: Dr. Ahmed Zeb (In-charge)
- Pathology and Laboratory: Prof. Dr. Mohsin Shafi (Chairman)
- Radiology: Dr. Kulsoom Nawab (Chairperson)
- Ex-officio members:** Three representatives

=== Ex-officio members ===
- Prof. Dr. Mahmud Aurangzeb – Dean KMC / CEO
- Dr. Awais Naeem – Hospital & Medical Director
- Prof. Dr. Syed Nasir Shah – Principal KCD

=== Public representatives (Board of Governors) ===
- Dr. Wajid Ali – Chairman
- Dr. Rubina Nauman Gillani – Member
- Dr. Bilal Umair – Member
- Mohammad Ishtiaque Ahmad – Member
- Mr. Taimoor Shah – Member
- Khawaja Tanveer Ali Mir – Member
- Eng. Javed Ihsan – Member

== Departments Of KTH Hospital ==
Khyber Teaching Hospital has the following medical and surgical departments:

Department Of Accident and Emergency

Department of cardiology

- Professor and Chairperson: Dr. Amber Ashraf
- Professor: Dr. Muhammad Faheem
- Associate Professor: Dr. Farooq Ahmed
- Assistant Professor: Dr. Sadiq Shah
- Assistant Professor: Dr. Awais Farhad
- Consultant Cardiologist (Not Verified)
- Senior Registrar (Not Verified)
- Registrar (Not Verified)
- Resident Medical Officer (Not Verified)
- Postgraduate Trainee (Not Verified)
- Trainee Medical Officer (Not Verified)
- Medical Officer (Not Verified)
- House Officer (Not Verified)
- Cardiac Technician (Not Verified)
- Cardiac Technologist (Not Verified)
- Head Nurse (Not Verified)
- Nursing Officer (Not Verified)
- Staff Nurse (Not Verified)
- Nursing Assistant (Not Verified)
- Department Coordinator (Not Verified)
- Administrative Officer (Not Verified)
- Department Of Dermatology

Department Of Endocrinology

Department Of ENT (Otorhinolaryngology)

Department Of Gastroenterology

Department Of General Medicine

Department Of General Surgery

Department Of Nephrology

Department Of Neurology

Department Of Neurosurgery

Department Of Nursing Department

Department Of Obstetrics and Gynecology

Department Of Oncology

Department Of Ophthalmology

Department Of Orthopedics

Department Of Pathology and Laboratory

Department Of Pediatric Surgery

Department Of Pediatric Urology

Department Of Pharmacy

Department Of Physical Therapy

Department Of Pulmonology

Department Of Radiology

Department Of Rheumatology

Department Of Urology

Department Of Paediatric

== See also ==
- Lady Reading Hospital Peshawar
- Hayatabad Medical Complex Peshawar
- Ayub Teaching Hospital
- Saidu Teaching Hospital
