= Abbottabad University of Science and Technology =

University in Pakistan

- جامعہ سائنس و ٹیکنالوجی ایبٹ آباد
- Abbottabad University of Science and Technology
- Other name: AUST
- Former name: Hazara University Havelian Campus
- Motto: اقرأ
- Motto in English: Read!
- Type: Public
- Established: 2008; 18 years ago
- Academic affiliations: Higher Education Commission (Pakistan); Pharmacy Council of Pakistan
- Chancellor: Governor of Khyber Pakhtunkhwa
- Vice-Chancellor: PROF. DR. TAHIR IRFAN KHAN
- Location: Havelian, Abbottabad District, Khyber Pakhtunkhwa, Pakistan; 34.06816°N 73.14945°E
- Campus: Urban
- Website: aust.edu.pk

The Abbottabad University of Science and Technology (AUST) is a public university located in Havelian, Pakistan. It offers undergraduate and postgraduate programs.

== History ==
AUST was started as the Havelian Campus of Hazara University in 2008 and got its own charter in 2015. There are four faculties within the university, listed below. It is affiliated with the Higher Education Commission.

== Faculties ==
- Faculty of Health & Biomedical Sciences
- Faculty of Humanities & Social Sciences
- Faculty of Sciences
- Faculty of Engineering and Technology

== See also ==
- University of Haripur
