= Board of Intermediate and Secondary Education, Abbottabad =

Education board in Khyber Pakhtunkhwa, Pakistan

Coordinates: 34°9′26.37″N 73°15′7.23″E

- Urdu: برائے متوسط و ثانوی تعلیم، ایبٹ آباد
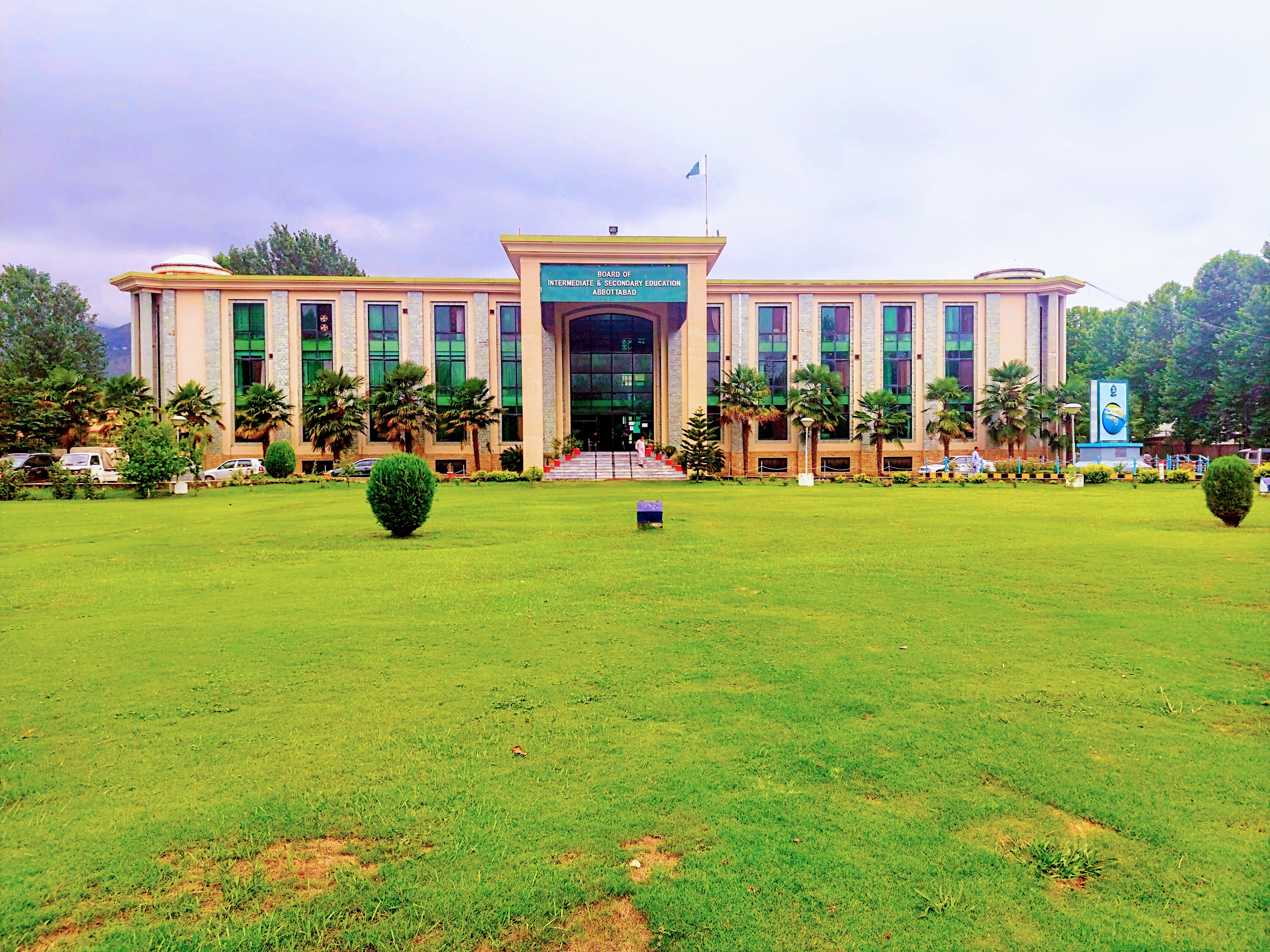
- front view of Board of Intermediate & Secondary Education, Abbottabad

Agency overview
- Formed: 1990
- Jurisdiction: Haripur; Abbottabad; Mansehra; Battagram; Kohistan
- Headquarters: Abbottabad
- Website: biseatd.edu.pk

The Board of Intermediate and Secondary Education, Abbottabad, more commonly known as BISE Abbottabad, is an intermediate and secondary education governmental board located in Abbottabad, Khyber Pakhtunkhwa, Pakistan. It is authorized with financial and administrative authority to organize, manage, regulate, develop and control intermediate and secondary education in general and accomplish examinations in the institutions affiliated with it. BISE Abbottabad came into being as a result of the break-up of Peshawar Board in 1990 under the North West Frontier Province Board of Intermediate and Secondary Education Act 1990. The organisation building is located on Murree Road, Abbottabad.

== Jurisdiction ==
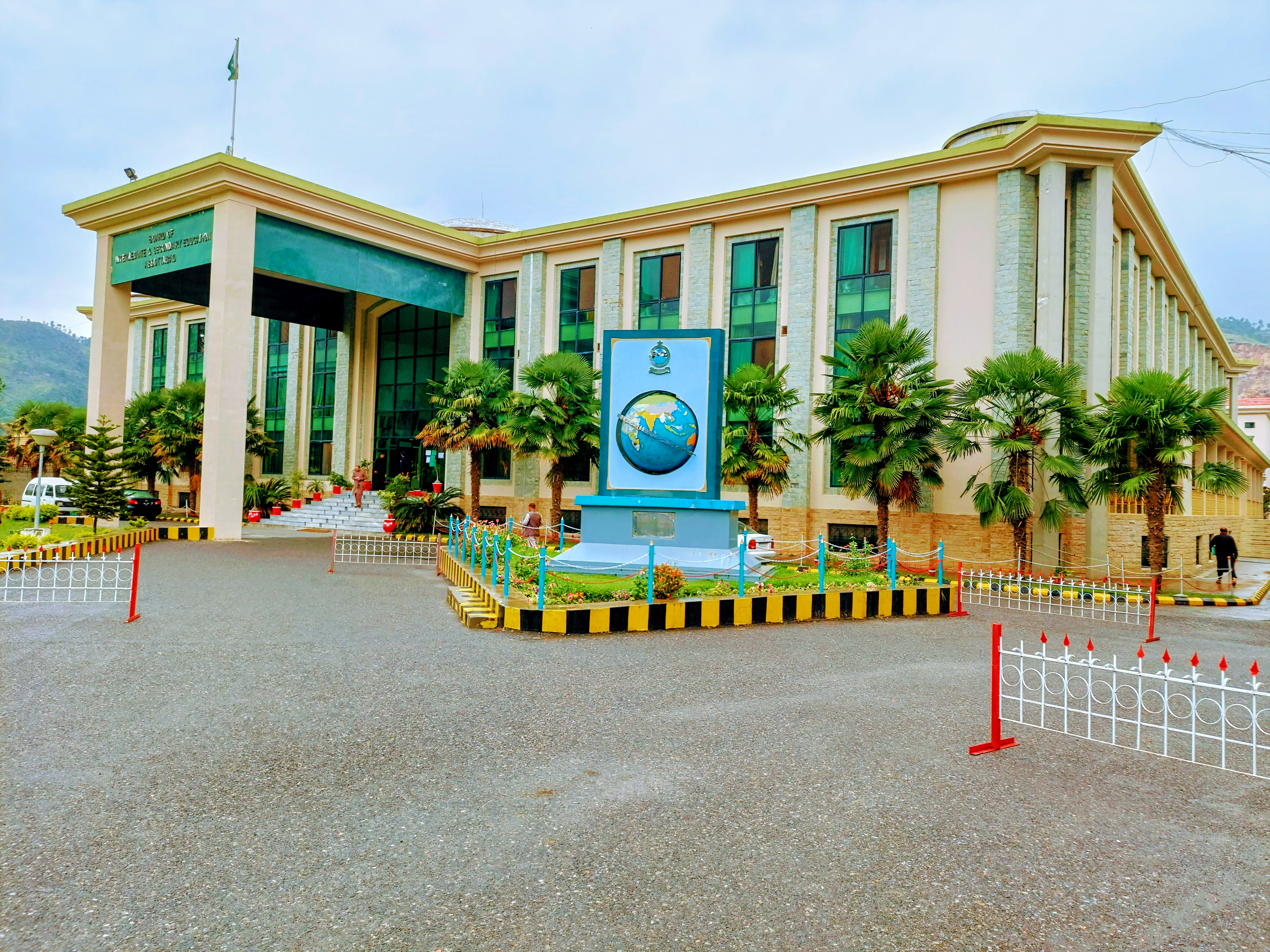
Front view of BISE Abbottabad, Pakistan

Jurisdiction includes five districts, namely Haripur, Abbottabad, Mansehra, Battagram and Kohistan, encompassing an area of 17,194 square kilometres and a population of 3.47 million.

== See also ==
- List of educational boards in Pakistan
- Education in Pakistan
- Education in Khyber Pakhtunkhwa
