= Ayub Teaching Hospital =

Ayub Teaching Hospital ATH ایوب تدریسی سپتال د ایوب تدريسي روغتون

Geography
- Location: Abbottabad, Khyber Pakhtunkhwa, Pakistan
- Coordinates: 34°12′15″N 73°14′19″E

Organisation
- Care system: Tertiary care
- Type: Teaching
- Affiliated university: Ayub Medical College

Services
- Beds: 1275

Helipads
- Helipad: 1

History
- Founded: 1995

Links
- Website: Ayub Teaching Hospital
- Lists: Hospitals in Pakistan

Ayub Teaching Hospital (Urdu, Hindko: ایوب تدریسی سپتال, Pashto: د ایوب تدريسي روغتون, abbreviated as ATH) is a public sector, non-profit tertiary level academic health sciences centre located in Abbottabad, Khyber Pakhtunkhwa, Pakistan. Established in 1995, ATH has one of the largest trauma centres in the region serving the northeastern districts of Khyber Pakhtunkhwa, southern Gilgit-Baltistan and the northern districts of Azad Jammu & Kashmir. The hospital also serves as the chief teaching hospital of Ayub Medical College.

== Patient care ==
ATH employs more than 500 in-house physicians, including 60 residents (fellows), as well as 200 nurses. It is part of a consortium of hospitals which operates in Khyber Pakhtunkhwa. Great hospital .

== Teaching ==
ATH is the principal teaching affiliate of Ayub Medical College and the School of Nursing. Every member of the hospital medical and dental staff holds an academic appointment at the hospital and operates numerous residency training programs as well as resident and fellowship positions.

== Staffing ==
There are around 3500 members of staff working at ATH. About 800 doctors are employed at the hospital, including senior doctors, trainees and house officers. Other staff members include paramedics, nurses, and allied health professionals.

== Wards ==
- Surgical (A, B, C)
- Medical (A, B, C)
- Gynaecology-Obstetrics (A, B, C)
  - Labour room
  - Nursery
- Accident & Emergency
- Anesthesiology
- Bait-ul-Mal
- Cardiology
- Dengue
- Dermatology
- Nephrology-Dialysis Department
- Endocrinology
- Gastroenterology
- Neurosurgery
- Oncology
- Ophthalmology (A, B)
- Orthopaedics (A, B)
- Otorhinolaryngology (ENT) (A, B)
- Paediatrics (A, B)
- Physiotherapy
- Neurology
- Psychiatry
- Pulmonology (A, B)
- Radiology
- Urology
- Rehabilitation center
- Burn center
- Institute of Nuclear Medicine, Oncology and Radiotherapy

== Administration ==
ATH is an autonomous body of the provincial government of Khyber Pakhtunkhwa and is headed by a chief executive appointed by the government. The chain of command includes:

- Medical Superintendent (1)
- Deputy Medical Superintendents (6)
- Resident Medical Officer (1)
- Chief Nursing Superintendent (1)
- Admin Officers (2)
- Human Resource Manager (1)
- Director Finance (1)
- IT In-charge Department (1)

== See also ==
- Khyber Teaching Hospital
- Saidu Teaching Hospital
