= Fellow of College of Physicians and Surgeons Pakistan =

Medical award in Pakistan

The Fellow of College of Physicians and Surgeons (FCPS) is a fellow of College of Physicians and Surgeons Pakistan (CPSP) who holds a professional qualification (fellowship) awarded after completing specialized training in a selected area of specialization and passing the examination in that particular specialty.

== Entrance exam ==
A medical doctor or dentist wishes to achieve fellowship must pass FCPS - I (Part 1) first. The examination is multiple choice questions (MCQ) based and can be done in the chosen specialty. There are about 73 specialties and sub-specialties in which specialization is offered.

== Duration of training ==
After passing FCPS - I, one may start his/her training. It has two parts: initial two years training in a chosen specialty such as General Medicine, Obstetrics and Gynaecology, Ophthalmology, Paediatrics, or General Surgery, etc. An Intermediate Module Exam (IMM) is taken after that. IMM exam consists of both theory and viva exams. The viva exam (called TOACS) can only be given once the theory exam is passed with at least 70% marks. The remaining training can be continued in the chosen specialty for further 2–3 years. After full 4–5 years of training and completing few compulsory requirements (such as rotations at the other relevant departments for certain durations, thesis, and case studies), the candidate is eligible to start attempting the final exam called FCPS-II. FCPS-II consists of theory, viva (TOACS), as well as clinical exams. After passing FCPS-II, the candidate is awarded the Fellowship of the College of Physicians and Surgeons of Pakistan and is called a specialist.

== National recognition ==
This fellowship is regarded as the specialist qualification (clinical) achieved by the physicians or surgeons in any specialty in Pakistan. Furthermore, the Higher Education Commission (Pakistan) equates this qualification with a Master of Science (MS) or a Master of Philosophy (MPhil).

== International recognition ==
To date, following qualifications are eligible for registration with General Medical Council (GMC) of the United Kingdom (UK) without any other exam:

- Anaesthesia

In addition, Cooperation Council for the Arab States of the Gulf (GCC) recognizes this qualification for registration as a specialist, and in Saudi Arabia, as a consultant in any specialty.

== See also ==
- Pakistan Medical Commission
- List of medical organizations in Pakistan
