= Institute of Nuclear Medicine, Oncology and Radiotherapy =

Cancer hospital in Abbottabad, Pakistan

The Institute of Nuclear Medicine, Oncology and Radiotherapy (Urdu: جوہری طبی رسولی اور شعاعي علاج کا ادارہ, or INOR) is a cancer hospital located inside premises of Ayub Teaching Hospital Abbottabad, Khyber Pakhtunkhwa, Pakistan established in 2004. The facility is one of 18 cancer hospitals operated by the Pakistan Atomic Energy Commission or PAEC. The PAEC has made a priority to apply nuclear technology in order to improve Pakistan's health sector. INOR patients receive state-of-the-art diagnostic and treatment either free of charge or at subsidized rates and is also involved in the "National Cancer Awareness & Prevention Program".

== See also ==
- Ayub Teaching Hospital
- Pakistan Atomic Energy Commission
- Institute of Radiotherapy and Nuclear Medicine
