= List of medical schools in Pakistan =

In Pakistan, a medical school is more often referred to as a medical college. A medical college is affiliated with a university as a department which usually has a separate campus. As of January 2019, there are a total of 114 medical colleges in Pakistan, 44 of which are public and 70 private. All but two colleges are listed in International Medical Education Directory. As per Pakistan Medical Commission 2021 database, there are 176 medical colleges in Pakistan (Medical and Dental Colleges), including 45 public sector and 72 private sector medical colleges. In addition, there are 17 public sector and 42 private sector dental colleges.

All medical colleges and universities are regulated by the respective provincial department of health. They however have to be recognized after meeting a set criteria by a central regulatory authority called Pakistan Medical Commission and by Higher Education Commission (Pakistan). Admission to the medical colleges is based on merit under the guidelines of PMC. Both the academic performance at the Higher Secondary School Certificate (HSSC) (grades 11–12) and an entrance test like NMDCAT determine eligibility for admission to most of the medical colleges.

== Admission process ==
To get admission into any government medical college, the weightage is determined by the provincial or federal government. A minimum weightage of 50% should be given to the NMDCAT. In order to get admission into any private medical college, the following weightage is used:

- 50% to the score obtained in National Medical and Dental College Admission Test (NMDCAT) weighted as follows:
  - Biology: 32%
  - Chemistry: 26.5%
  - Physics: 26.5%
  - English: 10%
  - Logical Reasoning: 5%
- 40% to marks of Higher Secondary School Certificate (HSSC) Pre-Medical.
- 10% to marks of Secondary School Certificate (SSC) Science.

The minimum requirements are:

- 65% or above in F-SC /HSSC or A-Levels equivalent IBCC certificate.
- 55% or above in NMDCAT for admission in Medical Colleges and 45% or above for Dental Colleges.

The Pakistani government exerts tight control over the available number of open medical school seats in both private and public colleges. The regulation forbids all colleges from admitting any student over the allocated maximum seats for the college under any circumstances.

== Medical seats ==
Number of registered medical Seats Allocation (PK)
| Province | Public | Private | Total |
|---|---|---|---|
| Azad Kashmir | 330 | 100 | 430 |
| Balochistan | 320 | 100 | 420 |
| Khyber Pakhtunkhwa | 1435 | 1050 | 2485 |
| Punjab and Islamabad | 4200 | 4900 | 8680 |
| Sindh | 2400 | 1850 | 4250 |
| Total | 8265 | 8000 | 16265 |

Number of registered medical colleges (PK)
| Province/Territory | Public | Private | Total |
|---|---|---|---|
| Azad Kashmir | 3 | 1 | 4 |
| Balochistan | 1 | 1 | 2 |
| Khyber Pakhtunkhwa | 10 | 10 | 20 |
| Punjab and Islamabad | 19 | 43 | 62 |
| Sindh | 12 | 17 | 29 |
| Total | 45 | 72 | 117 |

== Punjab ==
=== Public ===
| No. | Name of medical college | Funding | Established | Enrollment | University | City | Province | WDOMS profile | ECFMG eligible graduates |
|---|---|---|---|---|---|---|---|---|---|
| 1 | King Edward Medical University | Public | 1860 | 350 | UHS | Lahore | Punjab | F0001290 | 1953–current |
| 2 | Rawalpindi Medical University | Public | 1974 | 350 | UHS | Rawalpindi | Punjab | F0000151 | 1979–current |
| 3 | Fatima Jinnah Medical College | Public | 1948 | 300 | UoP | Lahore | Punjab | F0000199 | 1953–current |
| 4 | Nishtar Medical University | Public | 1951 | 300 | UHS | Multan | Punjab | F0001535 | 1953–current |
| 5 | Allama Iqbal Medical College | Public | 1975 | 325 | UHS | Lahore | Punjab | F0000203 | 1975–current |
| 6 | Shaikh Khalifa Bin Zayed Al-Nahyan Medical and Dental College | Public | 2009 | 100 | UHS | Lahore | Punjab | F00002567 | 2010-Current |
| 7 | Faisalabad Medical University also known as Punjab Medical College | Public | 1973 | 300 | UHS | Faisalabad | Punjab | F0000863 | 1977–current |
| 8 | Quaid-e-Azam Medical College | Public | 1970 | 325 | UHS | Bahawalpur | Punjab | F0001859 | 1971–current |
| 9 | Services Institute of Medical Sciences | Public | 2003 | 220 | UHS | Lahore | Punjab | F0001998 | 2004–current |
| 10 | Army Medical College | Public | 1977 | 204 | NUMS | Rawalpindi | Punjab | F0000204 | 1981–current |
| 11 | Nawaz Sharif Medical College | Public | 2008 | 61 | UHS UOG | Gujrat | Punjab | F0002566 | 2009–current |
| 12 | Sargodha Medical College | Public | 2007 | 120 | UHS | Sargodha | Punjab | F0002456 | 2010–current |
| 13 | Federal Medical and Dental College | Public | 2012 | 100 | SZAMBU | Islamabad | ICT | F0002675 | 2012–current |
| 14 | Ameer-ud-Din Medical College | Public | 2011 | 110 | UHS | Lahore | Punjab | F0002677 | 2011–current |
| 15 | Khawaja Muhammad Safdar Medical College | Public | 2010 | 120 | UHS | Sialkot | Punjab | F0002678 | 2011–current |
| 16 | Gujranwala Medical College | Public | 2010 | 120 | UHS | Gujranwala | Punjab | F0002679 | 2011–current |
| 17 | Sahiwal Medical College | Public | 2010 | 120 | UHS | Sahiwal | Punjab | F0002680 | 2011–current |
| 18 | Ghazi Khan Medical College | Public | 2010 | 120 | UHS | Dera Ghazi Khan | Punjab | F0004047 | 2016–current |
| 19 | Sheikh Zayed Medical College | Public | 2003 | 160 | UHS | Rahim Yar Khan | Punjab | F0002063 | 2005–current |

=== Private ===
| No. | Name of medical College | Funding | Established | Enrollment | University | City | Province | WDOMS profile | ECFMG eligible graduates |
|---|---|---|---|---|---|---|---|---|---|
| 1 | F.M.H. College of Medicine and Dentistry | Private | 2000 | 100 | UHS | Lahore | Punjab | F0000582 | 2001–current |
| 2 | Foundation University Medical College | Private | 2001 | 150 | NUMS | Rawalpindi | Punjab | F0000583 | 2002–current |
| 3 | Rai Medical College | Private | 2014 | 100 | UHS | Sargodha | Punjab | F0003100 | 2015–current |
| 4 | Islamic International Medical College | Private | 1996 | 100 | RIU | Rawalpindi | Punjab | F0000183 | 1998–current |
| 5 | Lahore Medical and Dental College | Private | 1997 | 150 | UHS | Lahore | Punjab | F0000584 | 2002–current |
| 6 | Shifa College of Medicine | Private | 1999 | 100 | STMU | Islamabad | ICT | F0000585 | 2002–current |
| 7 | Wah Medical College | Private | 2002 | 100 | NUMS | Wah | Punjab | F0002030 | 2007–current |
| 8 | University Medical and Dental College Faisalabad | Private | 2003 | 150 | UHS | Faisalabad | Punjab | F0002111 | 2003–current |
| 9 | University College of Medicine and Dentistry | Private | 2001 | 150 | UHS | Lahore | Punjab | F0001969 | 2001-current |
| 10 | Islamabad Medical and Dental College | Private | 1997 | 100 | SZABMU | Islamabad | ICT | F0002054 | 1997–current |
| 11 | Independent Medical College | Private | 2008 | 100 | UHS | Faisalabad | Punjab | F0002457 | 2008-current |
| 12 | Sharif Medical and Dental College | Private | 2008 | 100 | UHS | Lahore | Punjab | F0002568 | 2008–current |
| 13 | Continental Medical College | Private | 2008 | 100 | UHS | Lahore | Punjab | F0002569 | 2008–current |
| 14 | Akhtar Saeed Medical and Dental College | Private | 2009 | 150 | UHS | Lahore | Punjab | F0002570 | 2009–current |
| 15 | Central Park Medical College | Private | 2008 | 100 | UHS | Lahore | Punjab | F0002571 | 2009–current |
| 16 | Multan Medical and Dental College | Private | 2008 | 150 | UHS | Multan | Punjab | F0002572 | 2009–current |
| 17 | Shalamar Medical and Dental College | Private | 2010 | 150 | UHS | Lahore | Punjab | F0002454 | 2010–current |
| 18 | Avicenna Medical College | Private | 2010 | 150 | UHS | Lahore | Punjab | F0002453 | 2010–current |
| 19 | Shahida Islam Medical College | Private | 2016 | 100 | UHS | Lodhran | Punjab | F0005086 | not eligible |
| 20 | Rashid Latif Medical College | Private | 2010 | 150 | UHS | Lahore | Punjab | F0002392 | 2010–current |
| 21 | Islam Medical College | Private | 2010 | 150 | UHS | Sialkot | Punjab | F0002573 | 2010–current |
| 22 | Amna Inayat Medical College | Private | 2011 | 100 | UHS | Sheikhupura | Punjab | F0002574 | 2011–current |
| 23 | Azra Naheed Medical College | Private | 2011 | 150 | UHS | Lahore | Punjab | F0002575 | 2011–current |
| 24 | Al-Nafees Medical College | Public | 2012 | 100 | IU-H | Islamabad | ICT | F0002682 | 2012–current |
| 25 | Pak Red Crescent Medical and Dental College | Private | 2012 | 100 | UHS | Lahore | Punjab | F0002676 | 2017–2018 |
| 26 | Aziz Fatimah Medical and Dental College | Private | 2012 | 100 | UHS | Faisalabad | Punjab | F0002684 | 2012–current |
| 27 | Hashmat Medical and Dental College (Admission Stopped and Recommended to Ministry of Health for Closure) | Private | 2011 | 100 | UHS | Jalalpure Jattan | Punjab | F0002683 | 2011–2014 |
| 28 | Rawal Institute of Health Sciences | public | 2012 | 100 | SZABMU | Islamabad | ICT | F0002681 | 2012–current |
| 29 | Rahbar Medical and Dental College | Private | 2014 | 100 | UHS | Lahore | Punjab | F0003099 | 2020–current |
| 30 | HBS Medical and Dental College | Private | 2015 | 100 | SZABMU | Islamabad | ICT | F0004050 | 2020–current |
| 31 | HITEC-Institute of Medical Sciences | Private | 2016 | 100 | NUMS | Taxila | Punjab | F0005931 | not eligible |
| 32 | M. Islam Medical and Dental College | Private | 2016 | 100 | UHS | Gujranwala | Punjab | F0005933 | not eligible |
| 33 | Sahara Medical College | Private | 2016 | 100 | UHS | Narowal | Punjab | F0005936 | not eligible |
| 34 | Al Aleem Medical College | Private | 2017 | 100 | UHS | Lahore | Punjab | F0005928 | not eligible |
| 35 | ABWA Medical College | Private | 2017 | 100 | UHS | Faisalabad | Punjab | F0007213 | not eligible |
| 36 | Niazi Medical and Dental College | Private | 2018 | 100 | UHS | Sargodha | Punjab | not listed | not eligible |
| 37 | Bakhtawar Amin Medical and Dental College | Private | 2012 | 100 | UHS | Multan | Punjab | F0005929 | 2021–current |
| 38 | Sialkot Medical College | Private | 2015 | 100 | UHS | Sialkot | Punjab | F0004052 | 2020 - Current |
| 39 | CMH Kharian Medical College | Private | 2018 | 100 | NUMS | Kharian Cantt | Punjab | F0005930 | not eligible |
| 40 | CMH Institute of Medical Sciences | Private | | 100 | NUMS | Bahawalpur | Punjab | F0007211 | not eligible |
| 41 | CMH Lahore Medical College | Private | 2006 | 150 | NUMS | Lahore Cantt | Punjab | F0002055 | not eligible |
| 42 | CMH Multan Institute of Medical Sciences (CIMS) | Private | 2015 | 150 | NUMS | Multan Cantt | Punjab | F0004046 | 2020 - Current |
| 43 | Watim Medical College | Public | | 100 | UHS | Rawalpindi | Punjab | not listed | not eligible |

== Sindh ==
=== Public ===
| No. | Name of medical school | Funding | Established | Enrollment | University | City | Province | WDOMS profile | ECFMG eligible graduates |
|---|---|---|---|---|---|---|---|---|---|
| 1 | Dow Medical College | Public | 1945 | 350 | DUHS | Karachi | Sindh | F0001288 | 1953–current |
| 2 | Chandka Medical College | Public | 1973 | 250 | SMBBMU | Larkana | Sindh | F0000200 | 1979–current |
| 3 | Sindh Medical College | Public | 1973 | 350 | JSMU | Karachi | Sindh | F0001289 | 1979–current |
| 4 | Karachi Medical and Dental College | Public | 1991 | 250 | UoK | Karachi | Sindh | F0001000 | 1997–current |
| 5 | Khairpur Medical College | Public | 2012 | 100 | PUMHS | Khairpur | Sindh | not listed | not eligible |
| 6 | Liaquat University of Medical and Health Sciences | Public | 1881 | 350 | LUMHS | Jamshoro | Sindh | F0001893 | 1953–current |
| 7 | Peoples University of Medical & Health Sciences for Women | Public | 1974 | 250 | PUMHSW | Nawabshah | Sindh | F0001291 | 1979–current |
| 8 | Dow International Medical College | Public | 2007 | 150 | DUHS | Karachi | Sindh | F0002369 | 2007–current |
| 9 | Shaheed Mohtarma Benazir Bhutto Medical College Lyari | Public | 2011 | 50 | DUHS | Karachi | Sindh | F0002685 | 2011–current |
| 10 | Ghulam Muhammad Mahar Medical College Sukkur | Public | 2003 | 100 | SMBBMU | Sukkur | Sindh | F0002391 | 2008–current |
| 11 | Bilawal Medical College | Public | 2019 | 100 | BMC | Hyderabad | Sindh | F0007262 | 2019-current |
| 12 | Gambat Medical College | Public | | 100 | | Gambat-Khairpur Mirs | Sindh | listed | not eligible |

=== Private ===
| No. | Name of medical school | Funding | Established | Enrollment | University | City | Province | WDOMS profile | ECFMG eligible graduates |
|---|---|---|---|---|---|---|---|---|---|
| 1 | Aga Khan University Medical College | Private | 1983 | 100 | AKU | Karachi | Sindh | F0000152 | 1985–current |
| 2 | Baqai Medical College | Private | 1988 | 100 | BMU | Karachi | Sindh | F0001292 | 1993–current |
| 3 | Isra University | Private | 1997 | 150 | IU-H | Hyderabad | Sindh | F0000586 | 2002–current |
| 4 | Hamdard College of Medicine & Dentistry | Private | 1994 | 100 | HU-K | Karachi | Sindh | F0001085 | 1999–current |
| 5 | Jinnah Medical & Dental College | Private | 1998 | 100 | UoK | Karachi | Sindh | F0000587 | 2002–current |
| 6 | Sir Syed College of Medical Sciences for Girls | Private | 1998 | 100 | UoK | Karachi | Sindh | F0000588 | 2002–current |
| 7 | Ziauddin Medical College | Private | 1996 | 150 | ZU | Karachi | Sindh | F0001371 | 1996–current |
| 8 | Muhammad Medical College | Private | 1999 | 100 | UoS | Mirpurkhas | Sindh | F0000589 | 2003–current |
| 9 | Liaquat National Medical College | Private | 2007 | 100 | UoK | Karachi | Sindh | F0002162 | 2007–current |
| 10 | Bahria University Medical and Dental College | Private | 2008 | 150 | BU-I | Karachi | Sindh | F0002576 | 2009–current |
| 11 | Al-Tibri Medical College | Private | 2010 | 100 | IU-H | Karachi | Sindh | F0002577 | 2010–current |
| 12 | Liaquat College of Medicine and Dentistry | Private | 2006 | 100 | UoK | Karachi | Sindh | F0002418 | 2006–current |
| 13 | United Medical and Dental College | Private | 2013 | 100 | JSMU | Karachi | Sindh | F0003101 | 2013–current |
| 14 | Indus Medical College | Private | 2014 | 100 | UoS | T.M. Khan | Sindh | F0004051 | not eligible |
| 15 | Karachi Institute of Medical Sciences | Army | 2016 | 100 | NUMS | Karachi | Sindh | F0005932 | not eligible |
| 16 | Fazaia Ruth Pfau Medical College | Private | 2019 | 100 | Air University (Pakistan Air Force) | Karachi | Sindh | F0007215 | not eligible |
| 17 | Suleman Roshan Medical College | Private | | 100 | | Tando Adam | Sindh | not listed | not eligible |

== Khyber Pakhtunkhwa (KPK) ==
=== Public ===
| No. | Name of medical school | Funding | Established | Enrollment | University | City | Province | WDOMS profile | ECFMG eligible graduates |
|---|---|---|---|---|---|---|---|---|---|
| 1 | Khyber Medical College | Public | 1954 | 275 | KMU | Peshawar | Khyber Pakhtunkhwa | F0001083 | 1957–current |
| 2 | Ayub Medical College | Public | 1979 | 270 | KMU | Abbottabad | Khyber Pakhtunkhwa | F0000206 | 1982–current |
| 3 | Saidu Medical College | Public | 1998 | 115 | KMU | Swat | Khyber Pakhtunkhwa | F0002245 | 2004–current |
| 4 | Gomal Medical College | Public | 1998 | 115 | KMU | D. I. Khan | Khyber Pakhtunkhwa | F0002274 | 1998–current |
| 5 | Khyber Girls Medical College | Public | 2004 | 150 | KMU | Peshawar | Khyber Pakhtunkhwa | F0002112 | 2004–current |
| 6 | KMU Institute Of Medical Sciences, Kohat | Public | 2006 | 115 | KMU | Kohat | Khyber Pakhtunkhwa | F0002458 | 2009–current |
| 7 | Bannu Medical College | Public | 2007 | 110 | KMU | Bannu | Khyber Pakhtunkhwa | F0002686 | 2011–current |
| 8 | Bacha Khan Medical College | Public | 2010 | 100 | KMU | Mardan | Khyber Pakhtunkhwa | F0002578 | 2011–current |
| 9 | Gajju Khan Medical College Swabi | Public | 2014 | 70 | KMU | Swabi | Khyber Pakhtunkhwa | F0007263 | 2018–current |
| 10 | Nowshera Medical College | Public | 2017 | 115 | KMU | Nowshera | Khyber Pakhtunkhwa | F0005935 | not eligible |

=== Private ===
| No. | Name of medical school | Funding | Established | Enrollment | University | City | Province | WDOMS profile | ECFMG eligible graduates |
|---|---|---|---|---|---|---|---|---|---|
| 1 | Frontier Medical College | Private | 1995 | 100 | BU-I | Abbottabad | Khyber Pakhtunkhwa | F0001644 | 1998–current |
| 2 | Kabir Medical College | Private | 1995 | 100 | GU | Peshawar | Khyber Pakhtunkhwa | F0001154 | 1997–current |
| 3 | Women Medical College | Private | 2000 | 100 | KMU | Abbottabad | Khyber Pakhtunkhwa | F0000590 | 2003–current |
| 4 | Peshawar Medical College | Private | 2005 | 150 | RIU | Peshawar | Khyber Pakhtunkhwa | F0002070 | 2005–current |
| 5 | Abbottabad International Medical College | Private | 2008 | 100 | KMU | Abbottabad | Khyber Pakhtunkhwa | F0002459 | 2008–2018 |
| 6 | Swat Medical College | Private | | 100 | KMU | Swat | Khyber Pakhtunkhwa | not listed | not eligible |
| 7 | Pak International Medical College | Private | 2010 | 100 | KMU | Peshawar | Khyber Pakhtunkhwa | F0002580 | 2010–current |
| 8 | Rehman Medical College | Private | 2010 | 100 | KMU | Peshawar | Khyber Pakhtunkhwa | F0002581 | 2010–current |
| 9 | Muhammad College of Medicine (Former Al-Razi Medical College) | Private | 2012 | 100 | none | Peshawar | Khyber Pakhtunkhwa | not listed | not eligible |
| 10 | North West School Of Medicine | Private | 2017 | 100 | KMU | Peshawar | Khyber Pakhtunkhwa | F0005934 | 2022–current |

== Balochistan ==
=== Public ===
| No. | Name of medical school | Funding | Established | Enrollment | University | City | Province | WDOMS profile | ECFMG eligibility |
|---|---|---|---|---|---|---|---|---|---|
| 1 | Bolan Medical College | Public | 1972 | 320 | UoB | Quetta | Balochistan | F0000202 | 1978–current |
| 2 | Loralai Medical College | Public | 2016 | Not accredited by PMC | UoB | Loralai | Balochistan | not listed | not eligible |
| 3 | Makran Medical College | Public | 2016 | Not accredited by PMC | UoB | Turbat | Balochistan | not listed | not eligible |
| 4 | Jhalawan Medical College | Public | 2016 | Not accredited by PMC | UoB | Khuzdar | Balochistan | F0002526 | 2013–current |

=== Private ===
| No. | Name of medical school | Funding | Established | Enrollment | University | City | Province | WDOMS profile | ECFMG eligible graduates |
|---|---|---|---|---|---|---|---|---|---|
| 1 | Quetta Institute of Medical Sciences | Private | 2011 | 100 | NUMS | Quetta | Balochistan | F0002687 | 2011 — Current |

== Azad Jammu and Kashmir (AJK) ==
=== Public ===
| No. | Name of medical school | Funding | Established | Enrollment | University | City | Province | WDOMS profile | ECFMG eligible graduates |
|---|---|---|---|---|---|---|---|---|---|
| 1 | Azad Jammu Kashmir Medical College | Public | 2012 | 110 | UHS | Muzaffarabad | AJK | F0002928 | 2022-current |
| 2 | Mohtarma Benazir Bhutto Shaheed Medical College | Public | 2012 | 110 | UHS Lahore | Mirpur | AJK | F0002929 | 2012–current |
| 3 | Poonch Medical College | Public | 2013 | 110 | UHS | Rawalakot | AJK | F0003102 | 2022-current |

=== Private ===
| No. | Name of medical school | Funding | Established | Enrollment | University | City | Province | WDOMS profile | ECFMG eligibility |
|---|---|---|---|---|---|---|---|---|---|
| 1 | Mohiuddin Islamic Medical College | Private | 2009 | 100 | MIU | Mirpur | AJK | F0002582 | 2009–current |

== Curriculum ==
After successfully completing five years of theoretical and practical (clinical) training in the medical college and affiliated teaching hospitals the graduates are awarded a Bachelor of Medicine and Bachelor of Surgery (MBBS) degree. The graduates are then eligible to apply for a medical license from the PMC. The curriculum for all colleges, irrespective of their regional location and university affiliation, is designed by PMC. The curriculum spans a term of five years or seasons (four professional years).

- First year (first professional year – part 1)
- Second year (first professional year – part 2)
- Third year (second professional year)
- Fourth year (third professional year)
- Fifth/final year (fourth professional year)

Main courses of the curriculum, respective of the academic year they are examined in, are as follows:

- First Professional Year – Part I and II:
  - Anatomy
    - Cell Biology and Histology
    - Cross-sectional Anatomy
    - Embryology
    - Gross Anatomy
    - Neuroanatomy
    - Radiological Anatomy
    - Surface Anatomy
  - Human Physiology
  - Medical Biochemistry, Molecular Biology and Human Genetics
- Second Professional Year:
  - Behavioral Sciences and Medical Ethics
  - Legal/Forensic Medicine and Toxicology
  - General Pathology, Microbiology and Immunology
  - Pharmacology, Pharmacognosy and Therapeutics
- Third Professional Year:
  - Community Medicine*
    also called Social or Public Health Medicine
  - Ophthalmology
  - Otorhinolaryngostomatology (ENT)
  - Special/Systemic Pathology
- Fourth (final) Professional Year:
  - Internal Medicine
    - Medicine I
      - Angiology
      - Cardiology
      - Gastroenterology
      - Hematology
      - Hepatology
      - Medical Oncology
      - Neurology
      - Osteology
      - Pulmonology
      - Rheumatology
    - Medicine II
      - Critical Care Medicine
      - Dermatology
      - Endocrinology
      - Infectious and Venereal diseases
      - Nephrology
      - Psychiatry
  - Gynecology and Obstetrics
  - Pediatrics
- Surgery
  - Surgery I
    - Anesthesiology
    - Operative Care
    - Plastic and Reconstructive Surgery
    - Radiology, Radiotherapy and Radiosurgery
    - Surgical Infections
    - Surgical and Radiation Oncology
    - Traumatology (including Burns)
  - Surgery II
    - Bariatric Surgery
    - Cardiothoracic Surgery
    - General Surgery
      - Abdominal Surgery
      - Breast Surgery
      - Endocrine Surgery
      - Endoscopic Surgery
      - Laparoscopic Surgery
    - Neurosurgery
    - Oral and Maxillofacial Surgery
    - Orthopedic Surgery
    - Pediatric Surgery
    - Urology (includes Andrology)
    - Vascular Surgery

* includes Nutrition, Epidemiology, Biostatistics and Research Methods, Health education, Family Planning, Occupational, Environmental, Preventive and Tropical Medicine.

=== Assessment methods ===
Theoretical, practical and clinical knowledge is assessed by one or more of the following methods; multiple choice questions (MCQs), short essay questions (SEQs), short answer questions (SAQs), laboratory skills, viva voce, and objective structured clinical examination (OSCE). Required laboratory training is provided in biochemistry, histology, physiology, pharmacology, toxicology, pathology including hematology, immunology and microbiology. Teaching in gross anatomy is assisted by exploratory dissection of cadavers. A mandatory group research project is also to be submitted by the students before the fourth professional examination in the community medicine department. Students are also taught diagnostic imaging and technical report writing in the radiology department.

Clinical training and evaluation sessions (or clerkship) at the affiliated teaching hospitals is also compulsory for all medical students, especially in their second, third and fourth (final) professional years. These include observation, assisting and practice in various emergency, outpatient, inpatient and operative settings in the following rotating disciplines: anesthesiology, cardiology, dermatology, general surgery, gynaecology, internal medicine, obstetrics, ophthalmology, orthoptics, orthopedics, otorhinolaryngology, acoustics, pediatrics, psychiatry, radiology and urology.

Visits to various locations for the purposes of training and understanding of social, legal, communal and preventive aspects of health are also conducted if possible, such as:

- Community Medicine
  - Basic Health Unit (BHU)
  - Dog bite center
  - Factory or industrial unit
  - Hospital waste disposal site
  - Maternal and Child Health Center (MCHC)
  - Orphanage
  - Primary school
  - Rehabilitation center
  - Retirement home
  - Rural Health Center (RHC)
  - Special education institute
  - Vaccination center
  - Water purification plant
- Dermatology
  - Skin laser clinic
  - Venereal disease control center
- Legal and Forensics Medicine
  - Autopsy rooms
  - Courtrooms
  - Site of exhumation
- Internal Medicine
  - Cancer research center
  - Diabetes clinic
  - Emergency room
  - Intensive care unit
- Obstetrics
  - Abortion clinic
  - Labor room
- Ophthalmology
  - Eye laser clinic
  - Orthoptics clinic
- Otorhinolaryngology
  - Acoustics laboratory
  - Hearing aid center
  - Speech therapy clinic
- Pathology
  - Pathology museum
- Psychiatry
  - Mental asylum
- Surgery
  - Burns unit
  - Orthotic prosthetic center

=== Foundation year ===
Once the student has graduated after passing his or her final (fourth professional) examination, he or she is eligible to apply for a seat as a house officer in either the attached hospital of the college (usually as a paid employee) or in any other tertiary health care hospital (usually as an unpaid employee or "honorary"). The graduate has to first register (provisional) with and acquire a certificate from PMDC. The house officer has to serve for 12 months (foundation year) at one or more hospitals in four modules; 3 months in internal medicine, 3 months in general surgery, 3 months in medicine allied and 3 months in surgery allied in any order. The graduate can then apply for a medical practice license from PMDC which will allow the medical graduate to work as a registered medical professional anywhere in the country and study for higher specialties/qualifications.

- Internal medicine (3 months) – compulsory module
- Medicine allied (3 months) – options include:
  - Cardiology
  - Dermatology
  - Endocrinology
  - Gastroenterology
  - Hematology
  - Nephrology
  - Neurology
  - Oncology
  - Pathology
  - Pediatric medicine
  - Psychiatry
  - Pulmonology (chest medicine)
  - Rheumatology
- General surgery (3 months) – compulsory module
- Surgery allied (3 months) – options include:
  - Anesthesiology and intensive care medicine
  - Cardiovascular surgery
  - ENT, head and neck surgery
  - Gynecology and Obstetrics
  - Neurosurgery
  - Ophthalmology
  - Orthopedics
  - Plastic and reconstructive surgery
  - Pediatric surgery
  - Radiology and radiosurgery
  - Thoracic surgery
  - Urology

=== Public health education ===
All medical students are taught various aspects of public health such as:

- Auxology
- Biological Weaponry and Hazards
- Biostatistics
- Case Reporting
- Child and Maternal Healthcare
- Community Dentistry
- Community Genetics and Genomics
- Community Ophthalmology
- Community Psychiatry
- Data Collection and Archiving
- Disaster Management
- Environmental Medicine (including Sanitation and Hospital Waste Management)
- Epidemiology and Epidemic Control
- Euthenics
- Family Planning and Birth Control
- Food, Nutrition and Hygiene
- Global Health and Organizations
- Health Economics
- Health Education
- Health Surveillance
- Healthcare Systems
- Healthcare Infrastructure and Ergonomics
- Labor Health
- Occupational Safety and Medicine
- Outreach Methods
- Population Demographics
- Preventive Medicine (including vaccines)
- Rehabilitative Care
- Research Methods
- Resource Allocation
- Pharmaceutical Policy and Drug Trials
- Public Health Law and Reforms
- Social Health Determinants
- Tropical Medicine and Vector Control
- Telemedicine
- Venereal Disease Control and HIV/AIDS

== See also ==
- Medical school
- List of medical schools
- List of medical organizations in Pakistan
- Pakistan Medical and Dental Council
