= List of dental schools in Pakistan =

This is a list of dental schools located in Pakistan.

== Dental seats ==
Number of registered dental Seats Allocation (PK)
Province	Public	Private	Total
Balochistan	54	00	54
Khyber Pakhtunkhwa	269	275	544
Punjab and Islamabad	344	820	1164
Sindh	500	710	1060
Total	1167	1805	2972

Number of registered dental colleges (PK)
Province/Territory	Public	Private	Total
Balochistan	1	0	1
Khyber Pakhtunkhwa	04	05	09
Punjab and Islamabad	05	14	19
Sindh	07	12	19
Total	17	31	48

== List of dental colleges ==
=== Punjab ===
==== Public ====
No.	Name of dental school	Funding	Established	Enrollment	University	District	Province	Website
1	De'Montmorency College of Dentistry	Public	1934	110	UHS	Lahore	Punjab	none
2	Nishtar Institute of Dentistry	Public	1974	65	UHS	Multan	Punjab	nmch.edu.pk
3	Dental Section, Punjab Medical College	Public	1998	65	UHS	Faisalabad	Punjab	pmc.edu.pk
4	Dental Section, Army Medical College	Public	1977	54	National University of Medical Sciences	Islamabad	Islamabad Capital Territory	
5	School of Dentistry	Public		50	SZABMU	Islamabad	Islamabad Capital Territory	http://sod.szabmu.edu.pk/

==== Private ====
No.	Name of dental school	Funding	Established	Enrollment	University	District	Province	Website
1	Watim Dental College, Rawalpindi	Private	2016	50	UHS	Rawalpindi	Punjab	watim.com.pk
2	Dental Section, FMH College of Medicine and Dentistry	Private	2001	75	UHS	Lahore	Punjab	fmsystem.org
3	Dental Section, Akhtar Saeed Medical and Dental College	Private	2008	50	UHS	Lahore	Punjab	amdc.edu.pk
4	Dental Section, Lahore Medical and Dental College	Private	1997	75	UHS	Lahore	Punjab	lmdc.edu.pk
5	Margalla College of Dentistry	Private	1997	50	UHS	Rawalpindi	Punjab	margalla.edu.pk
6	Dental Section, University College of Medicine and Dentistry	Private	2001	75	UoL	Lahore	Punjab	uol.edu.pk
7	Dental Section, Sharif Medical and Dental College	Private	2008	50	UHS	Lahore	Punjab	sharifmedicalcity.org
8	Institute of Dentistry, CMH Lahore Medical And Dental College	Private	2006	50	UHS	Lahore	Punjab	cmhlahore.edu.pk
9	Dental Section, Multan Medical and Dental College	Private	2008	50	UHS	Multan	Punjab	mmdc.edu.pk
10	Dental Section, Islamabad Medical and Dental College	Private	1997	50	SZABMU	Islamabad	Capital	imdcollege.com
11	Dental Section, Rawal Institute of Health Sciences	Private	2012	50	SZABMU	Islamabad	Capital	rihs.com.pk
12	HBS Dental College	Private	2018	50	SZABMU	Islamabad	Capital	https://hbsmdc.hbs.edu.pk/
13	Islam Dental College	Private	2010	50	UHS	Sialkot	Punjab	imdc.edu.pk
14	Islamic International Dental College	Private	2001	75	RIU	Islamabad	Capital	riphah.edu.pk
15	Faryal Dental College	Private	2013	50	UHS PMDC	Sheikhupura	Punjab	aimec.edu.pk
16	Dental college, HITEC-IMS	Private	2018	50	NUMS	Rawalpindi	Punjab	https://hitec-ims.edu.pk

=== Sindh ===
==== Public ====
No.	Name of dental school	Funding	Established	Enrollment	University	District	Province	Website
1	Dr. Ishrat ul Ebad Khan Institute of Oral Health Sciences	Public	2006	100	DUHS	Karachi	Sindh	duhs.edu.pk
2	Sindh Institute of Oral Health Sciences	Public	2015	100	JSMU	Karachi	Sindh	jsmu.edu.pk
3	Dental Section, Karachi Medical and Dental College	Public	1991	100	UoK	Karachi	Sindh	kmdc.edu.pk
4	Dental Section, Liaquat University of Medical and Health Sciences	Public	1951	100	LUMHS	Jamshoro	Sindh	lumhs.edu.pk
5	Dental Section, Dow International Medical College	Public	2011	50	DUHS	Karachi	Sindh	duhs.edu.pk
6	Dental Section, Dow Medical College	Public	2012	50	DUHS	Karachi	Sindh	duhs.edu.pk

==== Private ====
No.	Name of dental school	Funding	Established	Enrollment	University	District	Province	Website
1	Baqai Dental College	Private	1991	75	BMU	Karachi	Sindh	baqai.edu.pk
2	Fatima Jinnah Dental College	Private	1992	80	UoK	Karachi	Sindh	fjdc.edu.pk
3	Dental Section, Hamdard College of Medicine & Dentistry	Private	1994	50	HU-K	Karachi	Sindh	hamdard.edu.pk
4	Dental Section, Jinnah Medical & Dental College	Private	1998	50	UoK	Karachi	Sindh	jmc.edu.pk
5	Altamash Institute of Dental Medicine	Private	2001	80	BU-I	Karachi	Sindh	altamash.edu.pk
6	Dental Section, Liaquat College of Medicine and Dentistry	Private	2006	75	UoK	Karachi	Sindh	lcmd.edu.pk
7	Isra Dental College	Private	1997	50	IU-H	Hyderabad	Sindh	isra.edu.pk
8	Ziauddin Dental College	Private	1996	50	ZU	Karachi	Sindh	zu.edu.pk
9	Dental Section, Sir Syed Medical College	Private	1998	50	UoK	Karachi	Sindh	sscms.edu.pk
10	Dental Section, Muhammad Bin Qasim Medical and Dental College (Admission Stopped)	Private	2012	50	UoK	Karachi	Sindh	none
11	Dental Section, Bhittai Dental and Medical College	Private	2013	50	LUMHS	Mirpur Khas	Sindh	bdmch.edu.pk
12	Dental Section, Bahria University Medical and Dental College	Private	2008	50	BU-I	Karachi	Sindh	bahria.edu.pk

=== Khyber Pakhtunkhwa ===
==== Public ====
No.	Name of medical school	Funding	Established	Enrollment	University	District	Province	Website
1	Khyber College of Dentistry	Public	1964	100	KMU	Peshawar	KP	kcd.edu.pk
2	Khyber Medical University Institute of Dental Sciences	Public	2014	50	KMU	Kohat	KP	kmu-ids edu.pk
3	Ayub College of Dentistry	Public	1998	55	KMU	Abbottabad	KP	
4	Saidu College of Dentistry	Public			KMU	Swat	KP	scd.edu.pk
5	Bacha Khan Dental Section	Public			KMU	Mardan	KP	

==== Private ====
No.	Name of medical school	Funding	Established	Enrollment	University	District	Province	Website
1	Sardar Begum Dental College	Private	1995	75	GU	Peshawar	KP	gandhara.edu.pk
2	Dental Section, Frontier Medical College	Private	1996	50	BU-I	Abbottabad	KP	fmc.edu.pk
3	Peshawar Dental College	Private	2005	50	RIU	Peshawar	KP	prime.edu.pk
4	Dental Section, Women Medical College	Private	2000	50	KMU	Abbottabad	KP	wmc.edu.pk
5	Dental Section, Abbottabad International Medical College	Private	2008	50	KMU	Abbottabad	KP	aimca.edu.pk

=== Balochistan ===
==== Public ====
No.	Name of medical school	Funding	Established	Enrollment	University	District	Province	Website
1	Dental Section, Bolan Medical College	Public	1972	50	UoB	Quetta	Balochistan	bmc.edu.pk

== See also ==
- Pakistan Medical and Dental Council (PMDC)
