= List of medical schools in Sindh =

In Pakistan, a medical school is more often referred to as a medical college. A medical college is affiliated with a university as a department which usually has a separate campus. The medical schools in province of Sindh are both private and public.

== List of medical colleges ==
=== Public ===
Name	Established	MBBS Enrollment	BDS Enrollment	University	City	WDOMS profile	IMED profile	ECFMG eligible graduates	
Dow Medical College	1945	350	-	DUHS	Karachi	F0001288	704060	1953–current	
Karachi Medical and Dental College	1991	250	100	KMPU	Karachi	F0001000	704160	1997–current	
Dow International Medical College	2007	150	50	DUHS	Karachi	F0002369	704200	2007–current	
Shaheed Mohtarma Benazir Bhutto Medical College Lyari	2011	50		DUHS	Karachi	F0002685	704425	2011–current	
Jinnah Sindh Medical College	1973	350		JSMU	Karachi	F0001289	704065		
Sindh Institute of Oral Health Sciences / JSMU			50	JSMU	Karachi				
Dr. Ishratul Ebad Institute of Oral Health Sciences			100		Karachi				
Chandka Medical College	1973	250		SMBBMU	Karachi	Larkana	F0000200	704086	1979–current
Bibi Aseefa Dental College			50			Larkana			
Khairpur Medical College	2012	100		PUMHS	Khairpur	F0007409	2048900	not eligible	
Gambat Medical College		100			Gambat	F0007264		not eligible	
Liaquat University of Medical and Health Sciences	1881	350	100	LUMHS	Jamshoro	F0001893		1953–current	
Peoples University of Medical & Health Sciences for Women	1974	250		PUMHSW	Nawabshah	F0001291	704100	1979–current	
Ghulam Muhammad Mahar Medical College Sukkur	2003	100		SMBBMU	Sukkur	F0002391	704250	2008–current	
Bilawal Medical College	2019	100		LUMHS	Hyderabad	F0007262		2019-current	
Total		2,800	450						

=== Private ===
Name	Established	MBBS Enrollment	BDS Enrollment	University	City	WDOMS profile	IMED profile	ECFMG eligible graduates
Aga Khan University Medical College	1983	100		AKU	Karachi	F0000152	704155	1985–current
Baqai Medical College	1988	100	75	BMU	Karachi	F0001292	704122	1993–current
**Hamdard College of Medicine & Dentistry	1994	100		HU-K	Karachi	F0001085	704115	1999–current
Jinnah Medical & Dental College	1998	100	50	JSMU	Karachi	F0000587	704035	2002–current
Sir Syed College of Medical Sciences	1998	100		JSMU	Karachi	F0000588	704045	2002–current
Ziauddin Medical College	1996	150	50	ZU	Karachi	F0001371	704045	1996–current
Liaquat National Medical College	2007	100		JSMU	Karachi	F0002162	704245	2007–current
Bahria University Medical and Dental College	2008	150	50	NUMS	Karachi	F0002576	704325	2009–current
Karachi Institute of Medical Sciences	2016	100		NUMS	Karachi	F0005932		not eligible
Fazaia Ruth Pfau Medical College	2019	100		NUMS	Karachi	F0007215	2048900	not eligible
Al-Tibri Medical College	2010	100		IU-H	Karachi	F0002577	704290	2010–current
Liaquat College of Medicine and Dentistry	2006	100	75	JSMU	Karachi	F0002418	704260	2006–current
United Medical and Dental College	2013	100		JSMU	Karachi	F0003101	704425	2013–current
Altamash Institute of Dental Medicine			80	JSMU	Karachi			
Fatima Jinnah Dental College			80	JSMU	Karachi			
Indus Medical College	2014	100		LUMHS	T.M. Khan	F0004051		not eligible
Isra University	1997	150	50	IU-H	Hyderabad	F0000586	704030	2002–current
Muhammad Medical College	1999	100	50	LUMHS	Mirpurkhas	F0000589	704055	2003–current
Bhittai Dental & Medical College	2014		80	LUMHS	Mirpurkhas			
Suleman Roshan Medical College		100		PUMHSW	Tando Adam	F0007604		not eligible
Total		1,750	590					

**Colleges are closed.

== See also ==
- List of medical schools in Karachi
- Pakistan Medical and Dental Council
- List of dental colleges in Pakistan
- List of medical schools in Pakistan
  - List of medical schools in Islamabad
  - List of medical schools in Punjab, Pakistan
  - List of medical schools in Balochistan
  - List of medical schools in Khyber Pakhtunkhwa
  - List of medical schools in Azad Kashmir
- List of universities in Pakistan
  - List of universities in Islamabad
  - List of universities of Punjab, Pakistan
  - List of universities in Sindh
  - List of universities in Balochistan
  - List of universities in Khyber Pakhtunkhwa
  - List of universities in Azad Kashmir
