= Shaikh Zayed Medical College and Hospital =

Medical College in Rahim Yar Khan, Punjab, Pakistan

Sheikh Zayed Medical College, Rahim Yar Khan شیخ زید طبی دبستان، رحیم یار خان
- Sheikh Zayed Medical College Rahim Yar Khan
- Motto: Service Before Self
- Type: Public
- Established: 2003
- Affiliations: College of Physicians and Surgeons of Pakistan; Pakistan Medical and Dental Council; University of Health Sciences, Lahore
- Principal: Muhammad Saleem
- Location: Rahim Yar Khan, Pakistan
- Campus: Urban
- Website: Official website

Sheikh Zayed Medical College (Urdu: شیخ زید طبی دبستان or SZMC), established in March 2003, is a public medical college located in Rahim Yar Khan, Punjab, Pakistan. It is named in honor of Shaikh Zayed bin Sultan Al Nahyan. The Medical College is affiliated with Shaikh Zayed Hospital, Rahim Yar Khan which has 900 beds and is the biggest hospital of Rahim Yar Khan District.

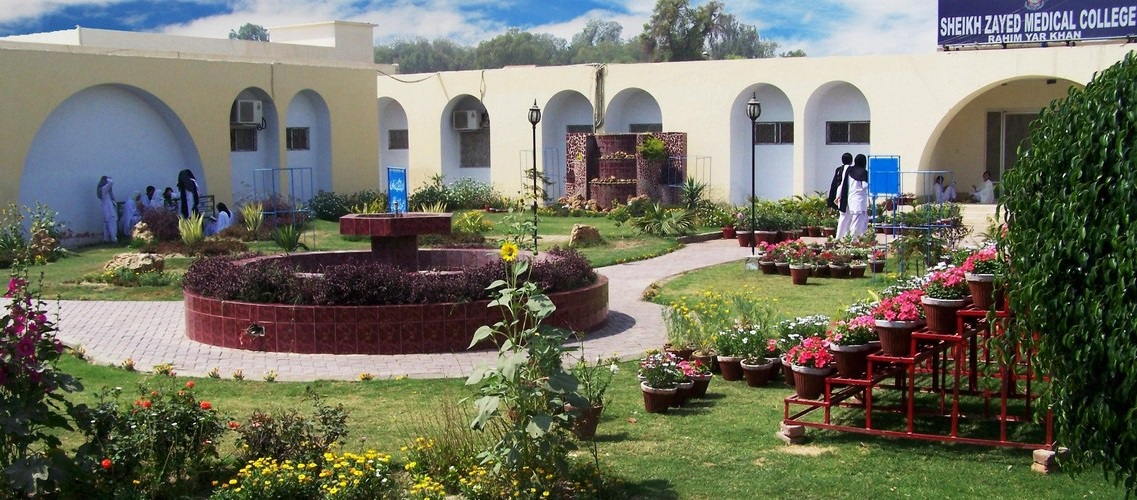
Sheikh Zayed Medical College, Rahim Yar Khan

== Recognition ==
- Recognized by Pakistan Medical & Dental Council for undergraduate & post graduate medical education. Every year, the college admits 150 students on open merit via entrance exam conducted by University of Health Sciences, Lahore.
- Accredited by the College of Physicians and Surgeons of Pakistan.
- Affiliated with the University of Health Sciences, Lahore.

== History ==
Shaikh Zayed Medical College was established in March 2003 in District Headquarter Hospital (now Shaikh Zayed Hospital) Rahim Yar Khan. Professor Dr Eice Muhammad was its founding principal.

== Affiliated Institutes ==
- Shaikh Zayed Hospital Rahim Yar Khan (previously known as District Head Quarter Hospital)
- College of Nursing Shaikh Zayed Medical College Rahim Yar Khan
- Hub & Spoke Model at Zahir Pir Rahim Yar Khan

== Official Publication ==
Journal of Sheikh Zayed Medical College (JSZMC) is serving as a center for Health Research Publication in the Institute and Region, under Research & Development Support Unit, Sheikh Zayed Medical College / Hospital, Rahim Yar Khan. JSZMC is a peer reviewed, scientific Journal published regularly and timely since 2010. It is recognized by Pakistan Medical & Dental Council, Islamabad. JSZMC is also a member of Pakistan Association of Medical Editors (PAME). We follow the guidelines according to “Uniform Requirements for manuscript submitted to biomedical Journals: International Committee of Medical Journal Editors (ICMJE)”.

== Undergraduate programs ==
The College is offering following under-graduate programs recognized by Pakistan Medical & Dental Council, Pakistan Nursing Council & University of Health Sciences.;

- MBBS
- Doctor of Physical Therapy
- BSc (Operation Theater Technology)
- BSc (Medical laboratory technology)
- BSc Hons. (Medical Imaging Technology)
- Nursing Diploma

== Post Graduate Programs ==
Shaikh Zayed Medical College & its affiliated institutes are recognized by Pakistan Medical & Dental Council, College of Physicians & Surgeons of Pakistan & University of Health Sciences and is offering training in following;

1. MS
2. MD
3. FCPS
4. MCPS

Admission in these programs is through Central Induction Policy under Punjab Residency Program.

== Departments ==
- Basic science departments
  - Anatomy
  - Biochemistry
  - Community medicine
  - Forensic medicine
  - Pathology
  - Pharmacology
  - Physiology
- Medicine and allied departments
  - Cardiology
  - Dermatology
  - General medicine
  - Neurology
  - Pediatrics
  - Preventive medicine
  - Psychiatry
  - Pulmonology (Chest medicine)
  - Radiotherapy
  - Urology
- Surgery and allied departments
  - Anesthesiology
  - Cardiac surgery
  - Cosmetic surgery
  - General surgery
  - Neurosurgery
  - Obstetrics and gynaecology
  - Ophthalmology
  - Oral and maxillofacial surgery
  - Orthopedics
  - Otorhinolaryngology
  - Pediatric surgery
  - Radiology

== Student Societies ==
Sheikh Zayed Medical College has the following societies working for students:

- Zayedians Awareness and Literary Society(ZALS)
- Zayedians Media Arts and Dramatics(ZMAD)
- Zayedians Athletic and Sports Club(ZASC)
- Zayedians Blood Donor Society (ZBDS)
- Helping Underprivileged Medical Aid Network (HUMANe)
- Patient Care Society (PCS)

SZMC student represented his alma mater in Egypt.

== Undergraduate Research ==
The students of SZMC have always been encouraged to do original research, present papers in national & international conferences world wide and get published in peer reviewed journals. One of students of SZMC won Best Paper Presentation Award at 10th Biennial International Physiology Conference of Pakistan Physiological Society held at Liaquat University of Medical & Health Sciences Hyderabad in April 2006. The students of SZMC presented 5 original research papers in 1st SAARC, 11th Biennial International Physiology Conference held at Shifa College of Medicine, Islamabad in November 2008. A student from SZMC presented his paper in 17th International Ain Shams Medical Students Congress in Cairo in February 2009. The students of SZMC have published their original research papers in renowned national journals during their MBBS.
