= Medical and Dental College Admission Test =

Pakistan

- Acronym: NMDCAT or National MDCAT
- Type: Paper based
- Administrator: Pakistan Medical and Dental Council, NUMS
- Skills tested: Biology, Chemistry, Physics, English language and Logical reasoning
- Purpose: Pre-requisite to admission in MBBS and BDS programs in public and private colleges.
- Year started: 2008 (2020 as NMDCAT)
- Duration: 3 hours
- Score range: 0 to 180
- Offered: Once a year
- Regions: Pakistan, Dubai, Saudi Arabia
- Languages: English
- Qualification rate: 55% for MBBS and 50% for BDS

Medical & Dental College Admission Test (MDCAT) is a paper based test conducted in Pakistan and internationally each year for those who want to pursue undergraduate medical and dental education in Pakistan. It is a pre-requisite for admission in all medical and dental colleges (both public and private) in Pakistan.

MDCAT is conducted annually by the Pakistan Medical and Dental Council. In 2020, the test replaced the provincial medical entrance exams conducted in the past. But in 2023, after the dissolution of PMC, the test becomes provincial level and each province has to choose a university to conduct MDCAT exam. The test in Punjab is conducted by University of health sciences lahore (UHS), in KPK by Khyber medical university (KMU) and in Balochistan by Bolan University of Medical and Health Sciences Quetta (BUMHS)

== History ==
Provincial medical entrance exams included the MDCAT conducted by the University of Health Sciences, Lahore in Punjab and Balochistan before the NMDCAT. It was implemented in 1998 as the Medical College Admission Test (MCAT) on the initiative of the then chief minister of Punjab Mian Muhammad Shahbaz Sharif to counter replete cheating in HSSC exams at the time. Other provinces also started conducting their medical entrance exams in the years to follow. From 1998 to 2007, it was conducted by the King Edward Medical University, Lahore. From 2008, University of Health Sciences, Lahore conducted the test in Punjab. Initially, Institute of Business Administration used to conduct separate Entry Tests for MBBS and BDS courses in public colleges of Sindh under the provincial government. Later, National Testing Service (NTS) started to conduct the tests. After the PMDC regulations were amended in 2016, NTS started to conduct a centralized Entry Test for public and private medical and dental colleges in Sindh. Educational Testing and Evaluation Agency (ETEA) used to conduct the provincial medical entrance exam before the NMDCAT in Khyber Pakhtunkhwa. After the PMDC was dissolved by the federal government in 2020 and Pakistan Medical Commission was introduced, the NMDCAT was introduced. Over 125,000 students registered for the NMDCAT from all over the country.

For the first time, in 2021, the test was computerized and conducted internationally through a local testing service. In 2022, the mode of examination shifted back to pen-and-paper based and provinces were given the authority to conduct the exam through their respective Admitting Universities.

== Seat distribution ==
The seats are limited as there are some 3405 seats for admissions solely based on previous academic record (locally called open merit format) in public medical colleges and some 216 open merit seats in public dental colleges of Punjab only. In addition, some seats are reserved for foreign and dual nationality holders. There are also 76 seats for overseas Pakistanis. Overseas Pakistanis are not charged higher tuition fee as opposed to foreign nationals who pay around $10,000 per year, which is often far less compared to many institutes in other parts of the world.

== Test structure and scoring ==
NMDCAT consists of 180 multiple choice questions. Each question carries 1 mark with no negative marking for wrong answers. Total score is 180.

Subject	WEIGHTAGE	
Subject	Percentage	No. of MCQs
Biology	45%	81
Chemistry	25%	45
Physics	20%	36
English	5%	09
Logical Reasoning	5%	09
TOTAL	100	180

in 2021 the total score was increased to 210. The next year the score was decreased to 200 and then in 2025 the score was decreased to 180 only.

== Syllabus ==
The syllabus for the exam is available on MDCAT Syllabus Official. It is claimed by the organization that it follows a common curriculum of HSSC. It consists of Biology, Chemistry, Physics, English language and Logical reasoning.

== Aggregate formula for merit ==
The MDCAT merit formula, also known as the aggregate formula, plays a crucial role in determining the overall merit for admissions in medical and dental colleges in Pakistan. The formula comprises contributions from different academic stages, allowing a comprehensive evaluation of a candidate's qualifications. According to Medico Engineer Aggregate Calculator, the MDCAT aggregate formula is calculated as follows:

10% from Matriculation (SSC) results 40% from Intermediate (HSSC/FSc) results 50% from the MDCAT (Medical and Dental College Admission Test) score This formula is designed to provide a balanced assessment, taking into account a candidate's performance in matriculation, intermediate studies, and the MDCAT examination.

Aspiring candidates and stakeholders often use an MDCat aggregate calculator to easily determine their overall merit score. This tool simplifies the calculation process, enabling candidates to understand their standing in the admission process.

It's important to note that the specific details of the formula may vary among institutions, and candidates are advised to check the official guidelines of the respective admission authorities for accurate and up-to-date information.

== Conducting body ==
Pakistan Medical and Dental Council, regulator of medical education in Pakistan, conducts the entrance exam.

== Reliability ==
The results of the NMDCAT 2020 were announced on December 16, 2020. The exam achieved a 0.96 on Cronbach's alpha and was determined to be extremely reliable and consistent with its structure and objectives.

== Controversies ==
In 2001, IBA received heavy criticism as its reputation was largely undermined when a massive fraud was found in the Entry Test conducted by Sindh government.

Medical admissions in Pakistan received for the 20 additional marks given to students who have memorized the Quran. These additional marks sometimes prevent non-Muslim students from getting onto the merit list. In 2012, a Christian student went to Lahore High Court because he couldn't get onto the merit list while his Muslim peers with less marks were on the merit list with the additional 20 marks. However, his plea was dismissed by the Lahore High Court.

In 2020, the date of the NMDCAT clashed with the Hindu festival of Diwali. The Hindu students and activists protested against it. The Hindu civil rights activist Kapil Devil said, "If you don't schedule exams on your Eid, how come you schedule it on Diwali?". However, despite these protests, the Pakistan Medical Commission refused to change the date of NMDCAT.

Protests started in Punjab as the syllabus released by PMC included out of syllabus topics of UHS despite the syllabus from the Admitting Universities already being released in accordance with the PMDC Regulations, 2020. PUMHSW (the Admitting University of Sindh as per the defunct PMDC Regulations, 2020) had also announced the date of Entry Test in Sindh and the National Testing Service had also issued the admit cards in accordance with the directives by Government of Sindh. Sindh government heavily criticised the federal government on introducing a centralized test for admissions and did not allow them to conduct NMDCAT in Sindh. However, it was on November 11, 2020, the Entry Test was cancelled by the Sindh High Court and the NMDCAT by PMC was declared legal and constitutional. It led to chaos and confusion among students from all over the country as the provincial entrance exams were cancelled only two weeks before and a centralized medical entrance exam came into existence for the first time. On November 11, 2020, the NMDCAT was delayed by Sindh High Court as key bodies weren't formed by the PMC in order to structure the syllabus and the date. After the formation of National Medical and Dental Academic Board, the Pakistan Medical Commission approved the syllabus and conducted the NMDCAT on November 29, 2020. After it was conducted, the test was heavily criticised by all provinces as it was alleged the content was out of provincial syllabi. It led to Sindh government rejecting the NMDCAT.
