= Gujranwala Medical College =

College in Gujranwala, Punjab, Pakistan

- گوجرانوالہ طبی درسگاہ
- Motto: Ad Astra Per Aspera
- Motto in English: through difficulties to the stars
- Type: Public
- Established: 2010
- Parent institution: University Of Health Sciences, Lahore
- Affiliations: Pakistan Medical and Dental Council; University of Health Sciences, Lahore
- Principal: Prof. Dr. Haroon Hamid
- Location: Gujranwala, Punjab, Pakistan
- Colours: Navy Blue and Gold
- Website: gmcg.edu.pk

Gujranwala Medical College (Punjabi, Urdu: گوجرانوالہ طبی کالج, commonly abbreviated as GMC) is a public medical college located in Gujranwala, Punjab, Pakistan. It was established in 2010 by the Government of Punjab to expand medical education and healthcare services in the Gujranwala Division.

The college is a constituent institution of the University of Health Sciences, Lahore and is recognized by the Pakistan Medical and Dental Council.

The college is affiliated with multiple teaching hospitals for clinical training, including:

- Gujranwala Medical College Teaching Hospital (GMCTH)
- Gujranwala Teaching Hospital (DHQ Hospital), Civil Lines.
- Children Hospital Gujranwala, Civil Lines

== Departments ==
GMC includes the following departments:

- Department of Anatomy
- Department of Physiology
- Department of Biochemistry
- Department of Pharmacology
- Department of Pathology
- Department of Community & Public Health Sciences
- Department of Forensic Medicine & Toxicology
- Department of Information Technology
- Department of Medicine
- Department of Surgery
- Department of Obstetrics and Gynecology
- Department of ENT
- Department of Ophthalmology
- Department of Pediatrics
- Department of Psychiatry
- Department of Medical Education

== See also ==
- List of schools of medicine in Pakistan
