= Rashid Latif Khan University =

Pakistani medical university

- Motto in English: Ne Plus Ultra
- Type: Medical School
- Established: 2010
- Affiliations: PMDC; UHS
- Chairman: Rashid Latif Khan
- Principal: Tahir Masood Ahmad
- Dean: Tahir Masood Ahmad
- Director: Farrukh Zaman
- CEO: Sabahat Khan
- Undergraduates: ~750 MBBS
- Location: Ferozepur Road, Lahore, Punjab, Pakistan; 31.2738°N 74.4053°E
- Campus: Urban
- Website: rlku.edu.pk

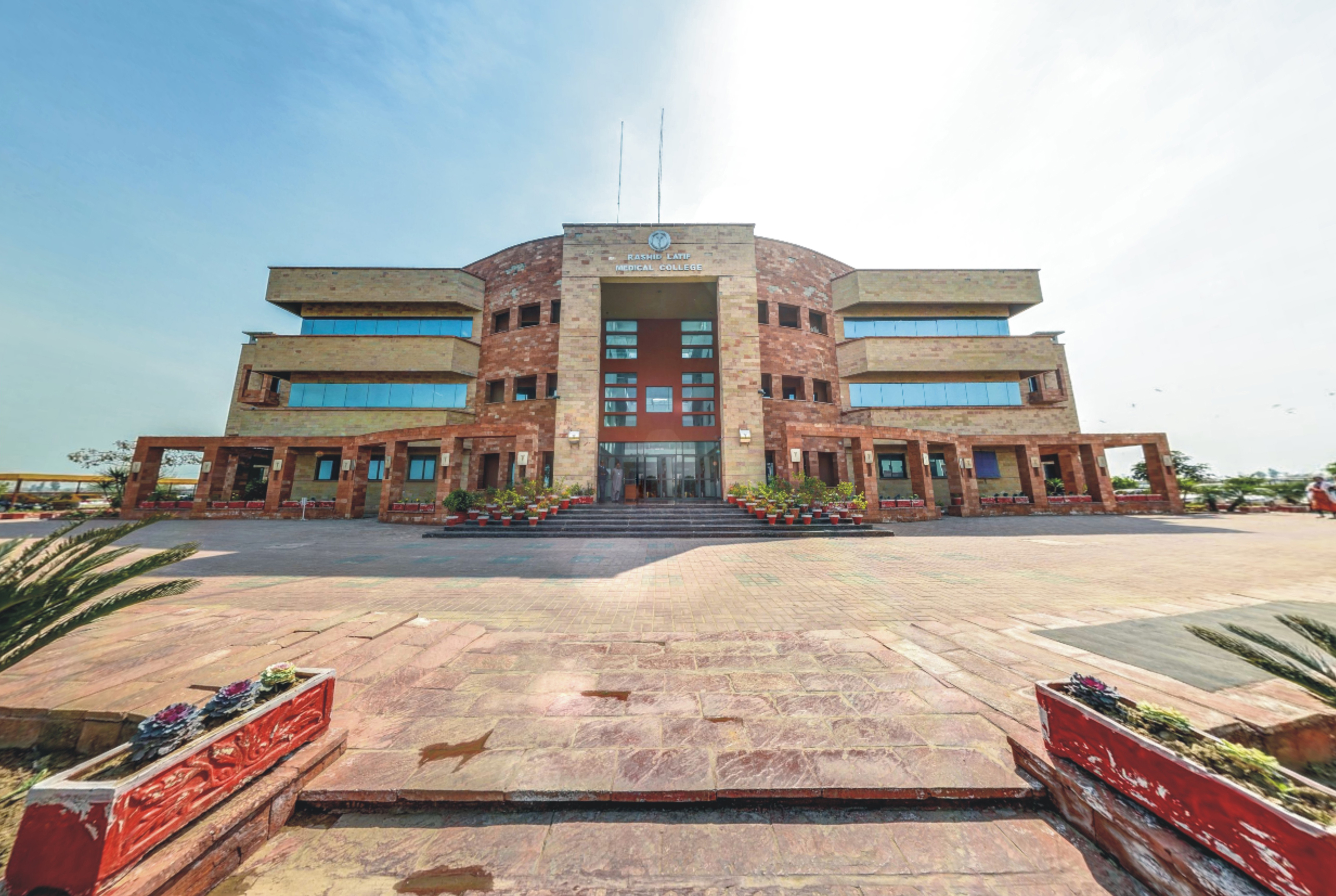
RLMC Building (front View)

Rashid Latif Khan University (RLKU) is a private medical university located at Ferozepur Road, Lahore, Punjab, Pakistan.

== History ==
It was established in 2010 and named after its founder Rashid Latif Khan.

Rashid Latif Nursing College was established in 2011 and was affiliated with Pakistan Nursing Council. Rashid Latif College of Physiotherapy was established in 2013.

In 2014, through an affiliation with the University of Sargodha, Rashid Latif College of Pharmacy was established, drawing 50 students per year.

In 2018, Rashid Latif Dental College was established and was affiliated with UHS.

In 2021, Rashid Latif Khan University Bill was passed and the college was upgraded to the university status.

== Teaching Hospital ==
RLMC is attached to a teaching hospital, the Arif Memorial Teaching Hospital, established and inaugurated in November 2010, with a capacity of 610 patient beds. As a charitable institute, it is funded predominantly from donations. Apart from fulfilling the requirements of the medical college, Arif Memorial Teaching Hospital has gynecology, pediatric, surgery, orthopedic, medical and ICU treatment facilities and round the clock emergency services. In addition, the hospital provides neonatal intensive care and 24/7 nurseries.

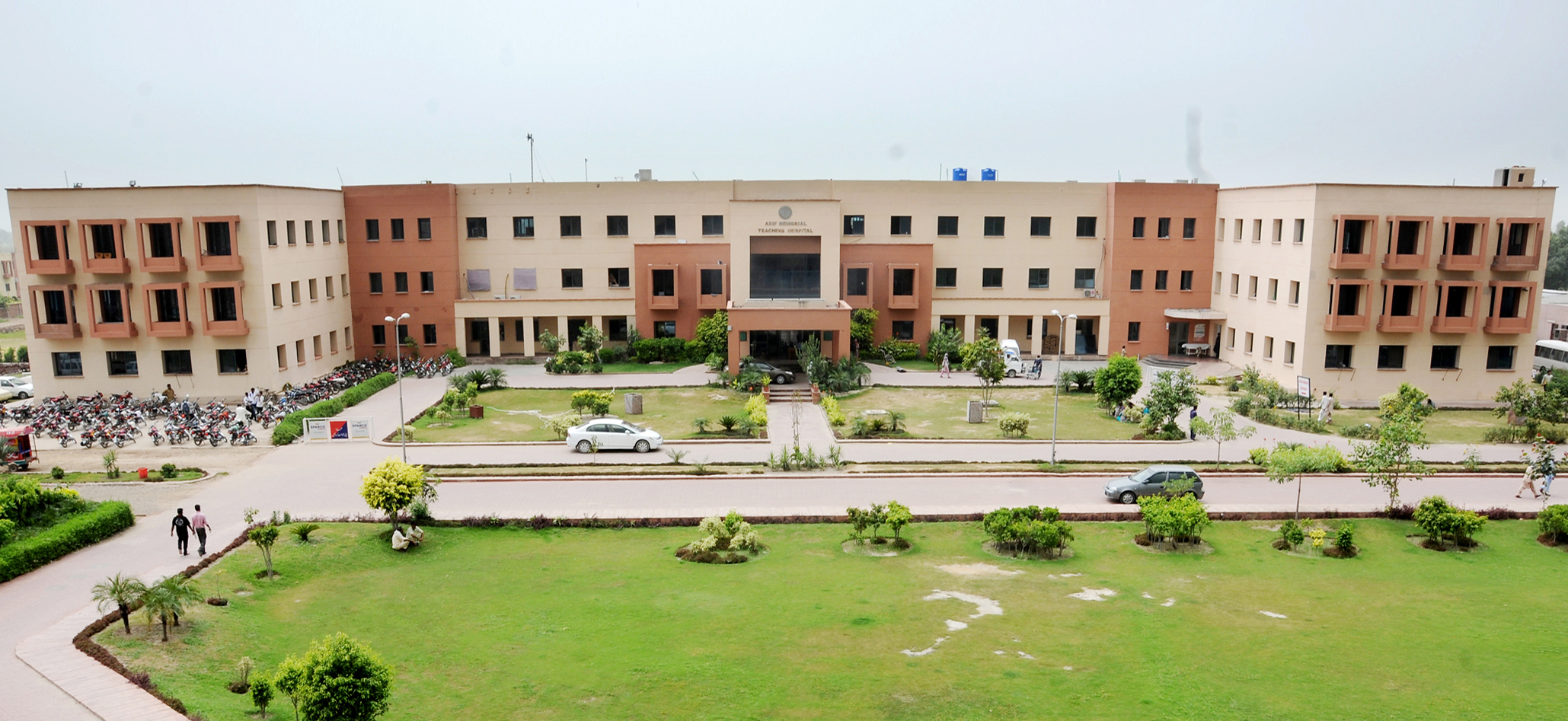
Arif Memorial Teaching Hospital
