= Federal Medical and Dental College =

Medical and Dental college in Islamabad, Pakistan

Coordinates: 33.6980°N 73.0542°E

Federal Medical & Dental College وفاقی طبی اور دندان سازی کالج
- Type: Public university
- Established: 2012
- Location: Islamabad, Pakistan
- Affiliations: Shaheed Zulfiqar Ali Bhutto Medical University; Pakistan Medical and Dental Council
- Website: fmdc.edu.pk
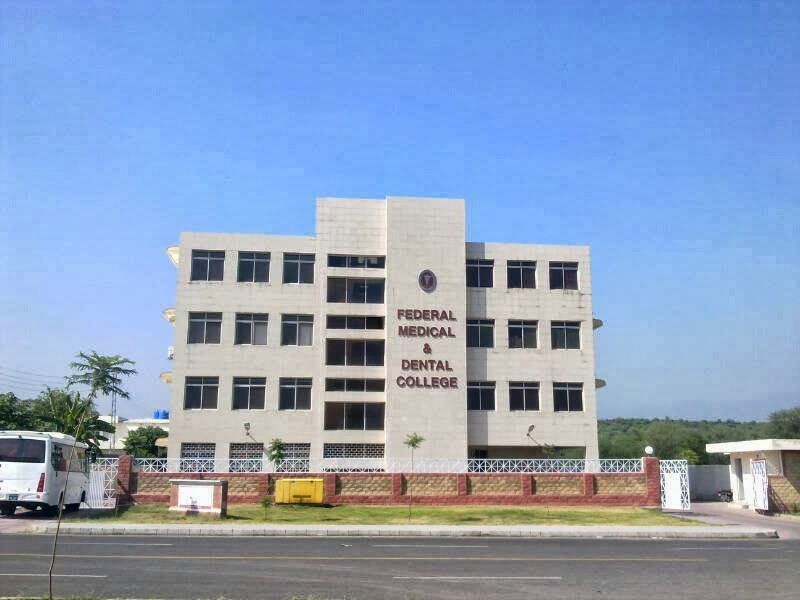

The Federal Medical and Dental College (Urdu: وفاقی طبی اور دندان سازی کالج) (abbreviated as FMDC) is a medical school located in Islamabad, Pakistan. The college gives admission to 110 MBBS students each year. It is a constituent college of Shaheed Zulfiqar Ali Bhutto Medical University.

== Recognition ==
FMDC is recognized by the Pakistan Medical and Dental Council and Ministry of National Health Services Regulation and Coordination. The college is listed in the International Medical Education Directory (IMED) and WHO Directory of Medical Schools. It has two attached teaching hospitals; Federal General Hospital and Pakistan Institute of Medical Sciences.

== Departments ==
FMDC includes the following departments:

- Department of Anatomy
- Department of Physiology
- Department of Biochemistry
- Department of Pharmacology
- Department of Pathology
- Department of Community & Public Health Sciences
- Department of Forensic Medicine & Toxicology

== See also ==
- Shaheed Zulfiqar Ali Bhutto Medical University
