= Wah Medical College =

Medical college in Punjab, Pakistan

Coordinates: 33.74695°N 72.7878°E

Wah Medical College واہ طبی کالج
- Type: Private
- Established: 2002
- Affiliations: Pakistan Medical and Dental Council; National University of Medical Sciences, Pakistan; University of Health Sciences, Lahore; POF Hospital
- Principal: Maj Gen (R) Abdul Khaliq Naveed
- Dean: Prof. Dr. Musarrat
- Location: Wah Cantonment, Punjab, Pakistan
- Nickname: WMC
- Mascot: WMColian
- Website: wahmedicalcollege.edu.pk

The Wah Medical College (WMC) (Urdu: واہ طبی کالج) is a medical college located at Wah Cantonment, Punjab, Pakistan.

The college is located at Jinnah Avenue in the centre of the Educational zone of Wah Cantonment POF Hospital is attached to the college as a teaching hospital. It is a part of a composite medical education program being run by the Pakistan Ordnance Factories Welfare Trust (POFWT) and Pakistan Ordnance Factories Board Wah Cantonment (POFBWC).

== Recognition and affiliation ==
- This college is approved by the Pakistan Medical and Dental Council (PMDC).
- Wah Medical College was affiliated with the University of Health Sciences, Lahore.

== Campus ==
The college campus covers almost 10.1 hectares of land, adjacent to its teaching hospital, POF hospital.

== Departments ==
- Medical education
- Anatomy
- Physiology
- Biochemistry
- Pathology
- Pharmacology
- Community medicine
- Forensic medicine
- Behavioral science
- General medicine
- General surgery
- Ophthalmology
- ENT
- Anesthesiology
- Pediatrics
- Dermatology
- Obstetrics and gynaecology
- Radiotherapy
- Urology
- Neurosurgery
- Orthopedics

== See also ==
- List of medical schools in Pakistan
- Pakistan Ordnance Factories
- University of Wah
