= Pakistan Red Crescent Society =

Humanitarian organization in Pakistan

- ہلالِ احمر پاکستان
- Abbreviation: PRCS
- Formation: 20 December 1947; 78 years ago
- Founder: Muhammad Ali Jinnah, Governor General of Pakistan
- Legal status: Active
- Purpose: To ease the hardships of the most vulnerable Pakistanis using the power of humanity
- Headquarters: Islamabad, Pakistan
- Coordinates: 33.68326336241781°N 73.05140992249287°E
- Region served: Pakistan
- Fields: Humanitarianism
- Official language: Urdu, English
- President: Asif Ali Zardari, President of Pakistan
- Chairman: Sardar Shahid Ahmed Laghari
- Affiliations: International Federation of Red Cross and Red Crescent Societies
- Volunteers: 1.8 million
- Website: prcs.org.pk

Pakistan Red Crescent Society (Urdu: ہلالِ احمر پاکستان, romanized: halali ahmar pakistan), is a national society of the Islamic Republic of Pakistan in the humanitarian sector, that provides emergency medical and relief services in Pakistan in both natural and human-made disasters. The organization was founded on 20 December 1947 after Pakistan's independence by an order called the Pakistan Red Cross Order (Succession to Indian Red Cross, established on June 7th 1920), issued by Muhammad Ali Jinnah, as Governor General of Pakistan. Jinnah became the founding president of the National Society. It was later renamed as Pakistan Red Crescent Society or the Red Crescent Order by act of Parliament in 1974. (assent by President of Pakistan on 1st March 1974 and published for general information on March 5th 1974 in Gazette (S.1033/L-7646) of Pakistan). Its national headquarters are in Islamabad.

Pakistan Red Crescent Society is working with a mission to become leading humanitarian organization of Pakistan, committed to prevent and alleviate human sufferings by mobilizing the power of humanity through volunteers.

== Branches ==
Pakistan Red Crescent Society's headquarters are located in Islamabad, and Provincial/State Branch Headquarters are in Karachi, Lahore, Peshawar, Quetta, Muzaffarabad, Gilgit respectively, while it has branches in all administrative units of Pakistan. These branches as well as the 92 district level branches are spread across the country, that ensures the coordination of the Society's field operations.

== Presidents of PRCS provincial branches ==
Every province has its own PRCS Provincial Branch, whose President is the Governor of that province.

President of Punjab Branch,

Governor of Punjab , Sardar Saleem Haider Khan

President of Sindh Branch,

Governor of Sindh Kamran Tessori

President of Khyber Pakhtunkhwa Branch,

Goveror of Khyber Pakhtunkhaw Faisal Karim Kundi

President of Balochistan Branch,

Governor of Balochistan Sheikh Jaffar Khan Mandokhail

== Volunteers ==
Pakistan Red Crescent Society had about 253,000 volunteers in 2014. It is estimated to have 1.8 million volunteers across Pakistan.

== Works ==
Pakistan Red Crescent is highly regarded in Pakistan by its respective stakeholders and the public and has over the years been well known for saving lives and strengthening recovery in disasters, contributing towards healthy living, and promoting social cohesion in vulnerable communities. It has emerged as the leading humanitarian organization in the country by providing immediate response in national disasters supported by its vast network of staff and volunteers. PRC has undergone significant developments through the support of its Movement Partners over the years, expanding the capacity of the organization to develop its core activities and respond to disasters.

In 2010, after one of the largest floods in Pakistani history, the Red Crescent Society provided much-needed support to native Pakistanis who were without food or water. They also joined forces with the American Red Cross in this effort, and were given $100,000 in aid to combat the devastation of the flood.

In 2014, the Pakistan Red Crescent Society in Sindh, in association with the JDC Welfare Organization, provided medical aid to some 300 mourners with doctors, paramedical staff, and volunteers during a two-day medical camp organized in connection with Youm-e-Ashoor at Numaish Chowrangi, Karachi.

== Pak Red Crescent Medical and Dental College ==
Pak Red Crescent Medical and Dental College was established in 2011 as a private college of medicine and dentistry in Lahore, Punjab by the Pakistan Red Crescent Society. It is registered with and accredited by Pakistan Medical and Dental Council, listed in WHO, Avicenna Directories and IMED, It is affiliated with University of Health Sciences, Lahore, and approved by Ministry of Health. Social Pak Red Crescent Teaching Hospital is attached as training and teaching hospitals.

== See also ==
- International Red Cross and Red Crescent Movement
- List of Red Cross and Red Crescent Societies
