= Avicenna Medical College =

Medical college in Lahore, Pakistan

Avicenna Medical College ابن سینا طبی کالج
- Avicenna Medical College
- Former names: Medical Organisation College
- Type: Medical school
- Established: 2009
- Affiliations: Pakistan Medical & Dental Council; University of Health Sciences, Lahore
- Chairman: Sheikh Waheed
- Principal: Prof. Dr. Gulfreen Waheed
- Dean: Dr. Rehana Shahid
- Director: Dr. Gul-e-Raana
- Undergraduates: ~750 MBBS
- Location: Bedian Road, Defence Housing Authority, Lahore, Punjab, Pakistan

Avicenna Medical College (Urdu: ابن سینا طبی کالج, abbreviated as AMC), established in 2009, is a private medical college located on Bedian Road, Defence Housing Authority, Lahore, Punjab, Pakistan.

It is a recognized institution by the Pakistan Medical and Dental Council, listed in the World Health Organization directory and the International Medical Education Directory, affiliated with the University of Health Sciences, Lahore, and approved by the Ministry of Health, Pakistan.

Aadil Hospital and Avecinna Hospital are attached as the training and teaching hospitals.
