= Amna Inayat Medical College =

Medical school in Pakistan

Amna Inayat Medical College آمنہ عنایت طبی کالج
- AIMCS
- Motto: Medical Education
- Type: Private sector Medical College
- Established: 2010
- Affiliations: Kishwar Fazal Teaching Hospital, Sheikhupura
- Academic affiliations: University of Health Sciences (Lahore); Pakistan Medical and Dental Council; Higher Education Commission of Pakistan
- Chairman: Ghulam Murtaza Cheema
- Vice-Chancellor: Zaffar Mueen Nasar
- Principal: Zafar Iqbal Ch.
- Academic staff: 250
- Administrative staff: 75
- Students: 500
- Undergraduates: 500
- Location: Sheikhupura, Punjab, Pakistan; 31.60118°N 74.21440°E

Amna Inayat Medical College (Urdu: آمنہ عنایت طبی کالج) is a medical school in Sheikhupura, Punjab, Pakistan.
