= Shifa Tameer-e-Millat University =

Pakistani university

- شفا تعمیر ملت یونیورسٹی
- Other name: STMU
- Type: Private
- Established: 2012; 14 years ago
- Accreditation: Higher Education Commission of Pakistan, Pakistan Medical and Dental Council; College of Physicians and Surgeons Pakistan; Pakistan Nursing Council; Pharmacy Council of Pakistan
- Chancellor: Manzoor H. Qazi
- Vice-Chancellor: Mohammad Iqbal Khan
- Location: Islamabad, Islamabad Capital Territory, Pakistan; 33.67772542044837°N 73.06607986542588°E
- Website: www.stmu.edu.pk
- Location in Islamabad Capital Territory

Shifa Tameer-e-Millat University (STMU) is a private university, established in 2012 in Islamabad, Pakistan. It is set up as a nonprofit institution in the private sector.

== History ==
The bill for the establishment of the university was passed by the National Assembly of Pakistan on 16 January 2012, and by the Senate of Pakistan on 10 February 2012. On 3 March 2012, President Asif Ali Zardari approved the Shifa Tameer-e-Millat University Act.

== Faculties ==
The university offers courses related to health sciences, and most recently, it started several courses related to Computer Sciences and Management Sciences. Shifa Tameer-e-Millat University has a teaching hospital named Shifa International Hospitals Ltd. and five faculties: Faculty of Health Sciences, Faculty of Nursing and Midwifery, Faculty of Pharmaceutical and Allied Health Sciences, Faculty of Computing and Faculty of Social Sciences and Humanities.
