= Fatima Memorial System =

Healthcare complex in Lahore, Pakistan

Fatima Memorial System is a health care complex and educational organization based in Lahore, Punjab, Pakistan. It was founded by Begum Saida Waheed.

== Complex ==
- Fatima Memorial Hospital, established in 1977, is a not-for-profit teaching hospital located in Shadman, Lahore, that has a total of 510 beds and specializes in the field of maternal and child healthcare center.
- FMH College of Medicine and Dentistry, established in 2001, is a private college of medicine and dentistry which is located in Shadman, Lahore. The college is accredited by the Pakistan Medical and Dental Council and affiliated with the University of Health Sciences, Lahore. The Fatima Memorial Hospital is attached as a teaching hospital.
- Saida Waheed College of Nursing, established in 1998 and named after Begum Saida Waheed, is a private college of nursing which is located on Raiwind Road, Lahore. The college is accredited by the Pakistan Nursing Council and affiliated with the University of Health Sciences, Lahore.
- FMH Institute of Allied Health Sciences
- FMH Centre for Postgraduate Training
- FMS Centre for Health Research

== Hospital Services ==
=== Clinical Services ===
- Internal Medicine
- Gastroenterology
- Pulmonology
- Nephrology including Dialysis Unit
- Rheumatology
- Endocrinology
- Neurology
- Cardiology
- Dermatology
- Psychiatry
- Oncology
- Physiotherapy
- Clinical Nutrition and Dietary Services
- Speech and Language Pathology
- Audiology
- Department of Emergency

=== Special Facility ===
- General Surgery
- Orthopedics and Skeletal Trauma
- ENT
- Ophthalmology
- Urology
- Bariatric Surgery

=== Maternal and Child Health ===
- Obstetrics and Gynaecology
- Maternal Fetal Medicine Unit
- Pediatrics
- Neonatology

=== Dentistry ===
- Oral and Maxillofacial Surgery
