= Sahara Medical College =

Medical College in Pakistan

- SMC
- Type: Private
- Established: 2015–16
- Affiliations: UHS, HEC
- Chairperson: Abrar ul Haq
- Principal: Shariq Sohail Jafar
- Undergraduates: 500
- Location: Narowal, Punjab, Pakistan; 32.11414°N 74.84421°E
- Website: Official website

Sahara Medical College or SMC, established in 2015, is a private-sector college of medicine and health sciences, located on Muridke Road Narowal, Punjab, Pakistan. It is registered with Pakistan Medical and Dental Council (PMDC), listed in World Directory of Medical Schools, affiliated with UHS and approved by Ministry of Health. The medical college has one private sector teaching hospital "SSMC" Sughra Shafi Medical Complex Narowal for undergraduate and postgraduate medical education & training. “Sughra Shafi Medical Complex-Narowal, a 600 bedded PMDC certified General Hospital, is providing state of art healthcare facilities to more than 4.5 million population of the catchment area.

== Environment ==
Sahara medical college is equipped with laboratories, departmental museums, lecture halls & tutorial rooms, library, digital library, auditorium, campus-wide WiFi facility and standby power source.

== Programs ==
SMC college offers undergraduate programs of MBBS and Allied Health sciences as well as post graduate residency and fellowship programs at its attached teaching hospitals.
