= People's University of Medical & Health Sciences for Women =

Medical university in Nawabshah, Pakistan

People’s University of Medical and Health Sciences for Women
- دانشگاه علوم پزشکی و صحی مردمی برای زنان
- Official Logo of PUMHSW
- Former name: People's Medical College (PMC) Nawabshah Medical College
- Motto: Access of Women to Knowledge
- Type: Medical education and research institution
- Established: 1974
- Founder: Zulfiqar Ali Bhutto
- Affiliations: People's Medical University Hospital (PMUH), Higher Education Commission (Pakistan), Pakistan Medical Commission, Pharmacy Council of Pakistan, Pakistan Nursing Council, College of Physicians and Surgeons Pakistan
- Endowment: Government-funded
- Chancellor: Governor of Sindh
- Vice-Chancellor: Prof. Dr. Gulshan Ali Memon
- Location: Near New Doctor's Housing Society People's Road,(Nawabshah), Shaheed Benazirabad District, Sindh, Pakistan; 26°14′36.5″N 68°24′14.7″E
- Campus: Urban
- Nickname: PUMHSW
- Website: pumhs.edu.pk

The People's University of Medical and Health Sciences for Women (PUMHSW) (Sindhi: پيپلز يونيورسٽي آف ميڊيڪل اينڊ هيلٿ سائنسز فار وومين) is a public medical university located in Shaheed Benazirabad District (Nawabshah), Sindh, Pakistan.

It is the first women's medical university in Sindh. The university is affiliated with People's Medical University Hospital (formerly referred to as People's Medical College Hospital or Civil Hospital, Nawabshah) and NORIN Cancer Hospital.

== Academics ==
In addition to MBBS, the university also offers undergraduate programs like DPT, PharmD, BS in Nursing, and BS in Public Health. Postgraduate courses in medicine, anaesthesiology, public health, and community medicine have also been offered since 2004. As a result, it received recognition from British Medical Association, ECFMG and other international bodies.

== Research ==
JPUMHS is the official research journal of the University which was started in 2011. It is a quarterly published, multi-disciplinary and peer-reviewed journal.

== Affiliated institutes ==
- Khairpur Medical College, Khairpur
- Maternity and Child Health Care Institute, Benazirabad
- The Rising Star Institute of Nursing, Hyderabad
- Thar Institute of Nursing And Allied Health Science, Umerkot
- Naushahro Feroze Institute of Nursing, Naushahro Feroze

== History ==
As a result of dire need of women to pursue higher education, a medical college in Nawabshah, People's Medical College, was established exclusively for women in 1974 by Zulfiqar Ali Bhutto, making it the first women's medical college in the province. The college offered undergraduate medical course (MBBS) in its initial years and was affiliated with University of Sindh. It got affiliated with People's Medical College Hospital in 1983. The medical college was initially located in the District Council (DC) High School (the oldest government high school in the city), consisting of an auditorium and a couple of hostels along with the main building of Muslim Boarding House.

In 2004, postgraduate courses were introduced. A proposal of Health Department of Sindh to introduce co-education in the college was vehemently opposed by the Academic Council of the college in 2005. The name of the college was changed to Nawabshah Medical College by the provincial government in 2006, leading to uproar as the abbreviation of the new name could be confused with Nishtar Medical College in Multan. In 2009, Sindh government upgraded the status of the medical college to a university through an act of the provincial legislature, and it was subsequently renamed as People's University of Medical and Health Sciences for Women.

The university was made the centralized Admitting University of the province by the provincial committee for admission to medicine and dentistry in 2020.
