= Fatima Jinnah Dental College =

Private dental college in Karachi, Pakistan

Coordinates: 24.8143°N 67.1110°E

- فاطمہ جناح کالج دندانی
- Type: Private
- Established: 1992
- Affiliations: Pakistan Medical and Dental Council & College of Physicians & Surgeons Pakistan
- Location: Karachi, Sindh, Pakistan
- Website: www.fjdc.edu.pk

Fatima Jinnah Dental College (FJDC) is a private dental college in Karachi.

Established in 1992, it is run and managed by Fatima Jinnah Dental College & Hospital Trust. The college is affiliated with Jinnah Sindh Medical University. The college is named after Fatima Jinnah, sister of the founder of the nation, Mohammad Ali Jinnah, who was herself a dentist.

== Facilities ==
=== Pre-clinical campus ===
The college's Pre-Clinical Campus in Korangi Creek

The college had its basic sciences section for the first and second professional years housed in a private building until August 2000, when the college was permanently shifted to its permanent custom built campus in Shah Abdul Latif Bhittai Colony in Korangi Creek Cantonment Area on the outskirts of Karachi.

=== Clinical campus ===
The third and fourth professional years are taught and trained at the Fatima Jinnah Dental Hospital located at Azam Basti, adjacent Phase-1 DHA.
