= National University of Medical Sciences =

Public university in Rawalpindi, Pakistan

Coordinates: 33.5978°N 73.0429°E

- جامعۂ قومی علوم طبی
- Motto: Understanding and Improving Life
- Type: Public
- Established: 2015
- Affiliations: Higher Education Commission (Pakistan); Pakistan Medical and Dental Council; College of Physicians and Surgeons Pakistan; Pakistan Army Medical Corps
- Chancellor: President of Pakistan
- Vice-Chancellor: Lt Gen Wasim Alamgir, HI (M)
- Undergraduates: 2000 Students (approximately)
- Postgraduates: 150 Students (approximately)
- Location: Rawalpindi, Punjab, Pakistan
- Website: numspak.edu.pk

The National University of Medical Sciences, commonly referred as NUMS, is a public university located in Rawalpindi, Punjab, Pakistan.

== Overview ==
The National University of Medical Sciences is recognized by the Higher Education Commission of Pakistan (HEC) for degree awarding status and accredited by the Pakistan Medical and Dental Council (PMDC) and the College of Physicians and Surgeons of Pakistan (CPSP) for undergraduate and postgraduate medical education and training. It was established in 2015 and run by the Pakistan Army Medical Corps. Previously, Army Medical College (which is a military-run medical institute) was affiliated with National University of Sciences and Technology, Pakistan (NUST) but now it is a constituent college of the university.

== Constituent institutions ==
- Army Medical College
- Armed Forces Post Graduate Medical Institute
- College of Nursing, Armed Forces Post Graduate Medical Institute
- Army College of Veterinary Sciences

== Affiliated institutions ==
- CMH Lahore Medical And Dental College
- CMH Kharian Medical College
- Quetta Institute of Medical Sciences
- CMH Multan Institute of Medical Sciences
- Wah Medical College
- HITEC Institute of Medical Sciences, Taxila
- Karachi Institute of Medical Sciences
- CMH Institute of Medical Sciences, Bahawalpur

=== Teaching/Training Hospitals/Institutes ===
- Armed Forces Institute of Cardiology
- Armed Forces Institute of Dentistry
- Armed Forces Institute of Mental Health
- Armed Forces Institute of Ophthalmology
- Armed Forces Institute of Pathology
- Armed Forces Institute of Radiology and Imaging
- Armed Forces Institute of Rehabilitation Medicine
- Armed Forces Institute of Transfusion
- Armed Forces Bone Marrow Transplant Centre
- Armed Forces Institute of Urology
- Army Medical Corps School Centre and Record Wing

== Programs ==
The disciplines and the degree programs offered by NUMS have been tabulated below.

Discipline	Degree Program		
Discipline	BS/BSc	MS/MPhil	PhD
MBBS	✓		
BDS	✓		
Cardiac Perfusion	✓		
Nursing	✓		
(Post RN)	✓		
Medical Lab Technology	✓		
Anatomy		✓	
Biochemistry		✓	✓
Microbiology		✓	
Haematology		✓	
Molecular Medicine		✓	✓
Histopathology		✓	
Community Medicine		✓	
Pathology			✓
Oral Pathology		✓	
Pharmacology		✓	
Physiology		✓	✓
Physiology		✓	
Dental Materials		✓	
Prodthodontics		✓	
Chemical Pathology		✓	
Public Health		✓	
Psychology	✓		
BS Social Science of Health	✓		

== See also ==
- List of medical colleges in Pakistan
  - List of medical schools in Islamabad
  - List of medical schools in Punjab, Pakistan
  - List of medical schools in Sindh
  - List of medical schools in Balochistan
  - List of medical schools in Khyber Pakhtunkhwa
  - List of medical schools in Azad Kashmir
  - List of medical schools in Gilgit-Baltistan
- List of universities in Pakistan
