= Liaquat University of Medical and Health Sciences =

Public medical university in Jamshoro, Sindh, Pakistan

Coordinates: 25.4305°N 68.2713°E

- دانشگاه علوم طبی و صحت لیاقت
- Official crest of LUMHS
- Former name: Liaquat Medical College (LMC)
- Motto: Gateway to a brighter future
- Type: Medical education and research institution
- Established: 1881; 145 years ago
- Affiliations: Liaquat University Hospital, Hyderabad/Jamshoro, NIMRA Cancer Hospital, Higher Education Commission (Pakistan), Pakistan Medical Commission, Pharmacy Council of Pakistan, Pakistan Nursing Council
- Endowment: Government-funded
- Vice-Chancellor: Dr. Ikram Din Ujjan
- Provost: Dr. Muhammad Yaqoob Shahani
- Location: Jamshoro, Sindh, Pakistan
- Campus: Urban
- Nickname: LUMHS
- Website: lumhs.edu.pk

The Liaquat University of Medical and Health Sciences (LUMHS) (Sindhi: لياقت يونيورسٽي ۾ طبي ۽ صحت سائنسز) is a public medical university located in Jamshoro, Sindh, Pakistan.

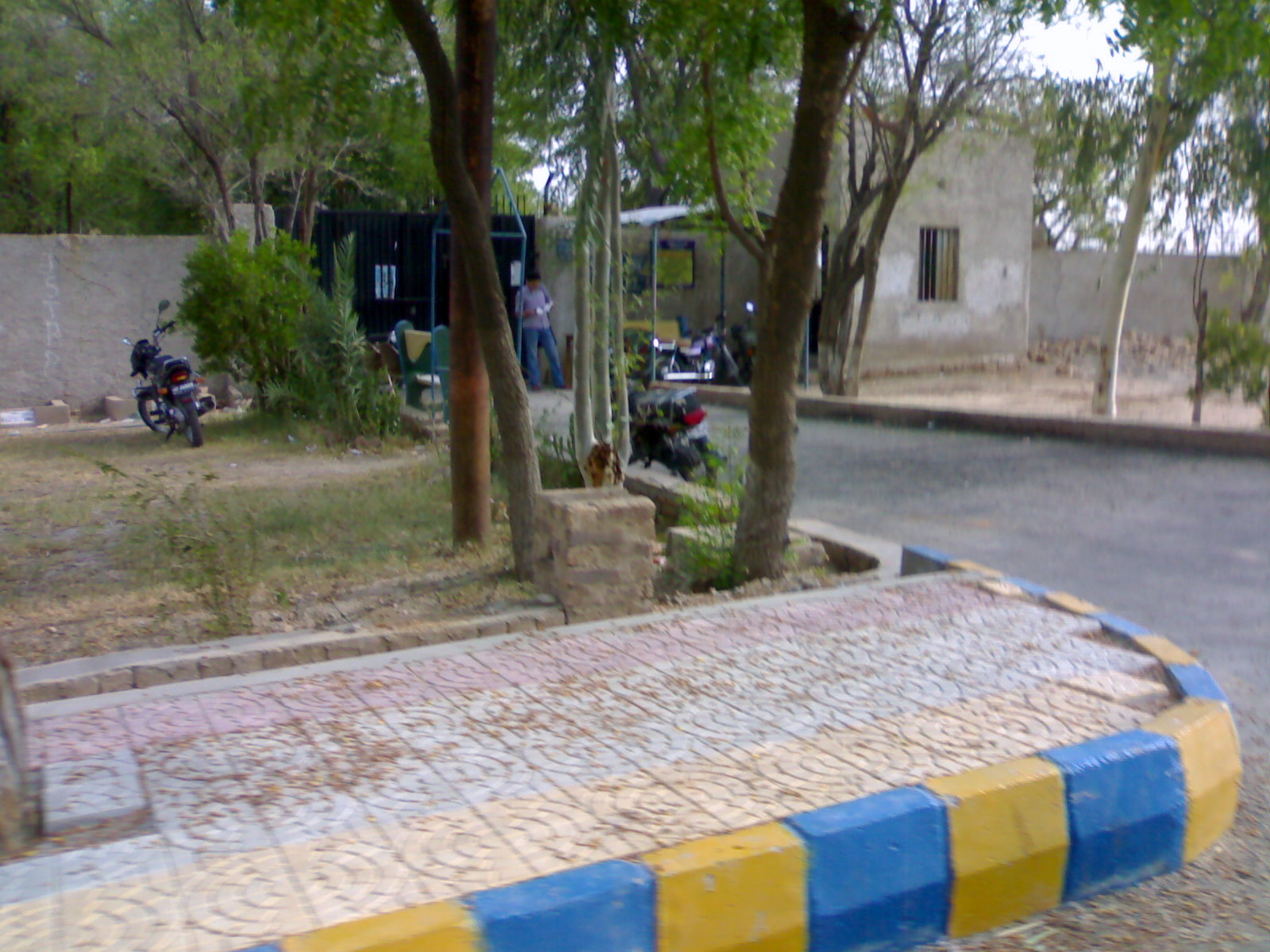
Pedestrian path at Liaquat University of Medical and Health Sciences.

Ever since it started as a medical school, it is known for its mission to bring innovative advances to medical education and to train undergraduate and postgraduate students in line with the highest professional standards. It is in conjunction with Liaquat University Hospital and NIMRA Cancer Hospital. The university has been ranked among top medical schools by Higher Education Commission (Pakistan).

== History ==
LUMHS is the second oldest medical school in Pakistan and the oldest in Sindh. In 1879, a surgeon general and the Government of Bombay recommended to the Commissioner in Sind to start a medical school. Sindh Medical School was subsequently started by Dr. Homestead and inaugurated by Henry Napier Bruce Erskine, the Commissioner in Sind province at the time, in 1881. 20 students were admitted and imparted with the training of licentiate physicians. The government started regulating the medical school in 1928. After the Medical Council of India decided to upgrade the status of medical schools to degree-awarding medical colleges, a committee was set up in 1941, consisting of Dr. Hemandas Rupchand Wadhwani (Minister of Public Health), Col. J. E. Gray (Inspector General of Civil Hospitals) and Mr. P. W. Abhichandani (Executive Engineer) to make plans for the new medical college. Major (later Lt Col) Aziz Khan eventually led this project.

It was later upgraded to the status of medical college known as Sindh Medical College in 1942. After Sind province got separated from Bombay Presidency, the college started teaching MBBS under University of Bombay. The requirements set by the university to maintain the affiliation led to the college being shifted to Karachi on December 10, 1945, and as a result, it was renamed as Dow Medical College. The Sindh government subsequently restarted the old medical college in the premises of the same civil hospital at Hyderabad in 1951, which acquired its name as Liaquat Medical College (LMC), after the name of first prime minister of Pakistan, Liaquat Ali Khan. Liaquat Medical College Hospital (later known as Liaquat University Hospital) was simultaneously started in the premises of the university.

The LMC was affiliated with University of Sindh. The college with its journey and natural growth for more than 62 years made contributions in both medical education and health care in the province and the country.

=== Relocation ===
The college was shifted to its new campus which spreads over 570 acres at Jamshoro in 1963 as the provincial government found the campus in Hyderabad to be inadequate and not sufficient to meet the demands of a top tier medical college. Faculty of Dentistry was also introduced in the same year after relocation. It became the second oldest and the largest institute of dentistry in the country. Postgraduate courses were also started simultaneously. After an ordinance was passed by Government of Sindh in 2001, it was upgraded to the status of the first public-sector medical university of the country. IT project was approved in 2002. The university was ranked as the second best medical university in Pakistan throughout its initial years after being upgraded by the HEC.

In 2019, the university was made the Admitting University and it conducted the provincial Entry Test to MBBS and BDS through the testing agency of National Testing Service (NTS).

== Programs offered ==
Along with MBBS and BDS programs offered by the university, other research-based programs like D-Pharmacy, BS biomedical engineering, BS technology, and diplomas are also offered. BSc Nursing is also offered by two nursing schools. Pakistan's first male-only medical college, Bilawal Medical College, is also affiliated with LUMHS.

== Academic profile ==
The university offers degrees in the following departments:

- Department of Medicine
- Department of Pediatrics
- Department of Pulmonology/Chest Medicine
- Department of Cardiology
- Department of Dermatology
- Department of Neurology
- Department of Nephrology
- Department of Psychiatry
- Department of Family Medicine
- Department of Gastroenterology
- Department of Nuclear Medicine
- Department of Neurosurgery
- Department of Hematology

== Medical education ==
Around 350 medical students graduate every year and practice medicine in their respective districts and/or pursue postgraduate studies.

=== Curriculum ===
The MBBS curriculum consists of 2 years of preclinical basic medical sciences, followed by 3 years of clinical curriculum. In 2008, the university introduced semester system for the first time in the country which was later replaced by the annual system in 2019 after the amendment of PMDC Regulations, 2018. In 2021, integrated modular curriculum was introduced in the university.

== Postgraduate courses ==
In 1989, after the number of postgraduate courses rapidly expanded, Postgraduate Medical Centre was established. It soon became recognized for its training of FCPS and MCPS in all disciplines of medicine, surgery, dentistry and allied sciences. It also received recognition from British Medical Association, ECFMG and several other international bodies. Thousands of specialists have graduated with postgraduate qualifications of MD, M.Phil, MS and diplomas from the centre.

== Research and Development ==
In 2021, the university set up first ever cancer research laboratory in Pakistan.

First ever endoscopic discectomy surgery in any public sector hospital of Sindh was also performed at the university's neurosurgery department.

The university has also taken numerous steps throughout its history to foster research programs.

Journal of Liaquat University of Medical and Health Sciences (JLUMHS) Jamshoro, Pakistan, publishes original manuscripts, case reports and reviews on topics pertaining to medical and health sciences. It is included in Index Medicus for WHO Eastern Mediterranean Region (IMEMR) as well as Embase.

Liaquat Medical Research Journal (LMRJ) [ISSN (Print): 2664-5734] is a print and online (double blind, peer-reviewed) journal devoted to publishing innovative research and scholastic / academic content from all fields of medical and health sciences, concentrating on recent advances in clinical, diagnostic and preventive domains.

Research Journal of Engineering & Technology publishes scientific research articles that describe the latest research and developments in engineering, medical sciences and technology.

== Medical Research Center ==
The Medical Research Center (MRC) promotes the health of people in Pakistan and around the world by sponsoring good science and training scientists. MRC collaborates closely with Pakistani health facilities to host clinical research/trials through its established hospital-based clinical research sites. The Medical Research Centre (MRC) conducts research in a variety of fields and provides technical and advisory research services to local and international clients/investigators/sponsors who may want technical assistance or collaboration in the implementation of health research. National and international collaborations are encouraged in collaboration with other research institutes, academics, and business groups, and they use their networks and influence to form new partnerships that produce exceptional research and innovation in the health sector.

== See also ==
- List of universities in Pakistan
- List of medical schools in Pakistan
