= Ghulam Akbar Khan Niazi =

Pakistani-Saudi Arabian physician (born 1937)

- Born: 1937 (age 88–89); Musakhel, Punjab, Pakistan
- Occupation: Military physician
- Known for: Director of Saudi Arabian National Guard Medical Services; Founder of Islamabad Medical and Dental College

Ghulam Akbar Khan Niazi is a Pakistani-Saudi Arabian physician. He served as a military doctor in the Saudi Arabian National Guard Medical Services for three decades, later becoming its director, as well as being a family physician in the Saudi royal family and founding the Islamabad Medical and Dental College in Pakistan.

== Early life and education ==
Niazi was born in 1937 in Musakhel, Punjab, and graduated in medicine from the Nishtar Medical College in Multan in 1960. He worked for three years under the Health Department in Pakistan, before moving to Saudi Arabia in 1963 where he joined the Saudi Ministry of Health.

Niazi has a fellowship in medicine from the Vienna University in Austria, and a postgraduate diploma specialising in skin diseases from the University of Liverpool School of Medicine.

== Medical career ==
After working under the Saudi health ministry for two years, he joined the Saudi Arabian National Guard Medical Services' western wing in 1965, where he ultimately rose to become its director-general. He remained associated with the Saudi military medical service for over three decades. He also served as the personal and family physician of then-Prince Abdullah bin Abdulaziz, who would later become King.

In addition, he was the director of the King Khalid National Guard Hospital in Jeddah. In 1986, Niazi was granted Saudi citizenship by Crown Prince Abdullah for his services. Describing the occasion, Niazi recounts that while working at the hospital as its head that same year, he had the distinction of receiving and hosting Princess Diana and Prince Charles at the facility. When some local doctors appeared discontent that a foreigner was not just heading the institute, but taking much of the spotlight during the royal couple's visit, news of this reportedly reached the Crown Prince. Abdullah immediately summoned Niazi to his royal court one morning, and remarked:

"You have been living here for so many years, why shouldn't I grant you nationality of Saudi Arabia?" This was indeed a pleasant surprise for me and I bowed my head to express consent, Niazi said. "He granted me the nationality, saying 'Go and serve my people as a Saudi citizen and nobody now will call you a foreigner or a non-Saudi national."

— Interview with Arab News

On his return to Pakistan in 2004, he established the Islamabad Medical and Dental College. He is a member of the Makkah Foundation, which runs the Punjab School projects. He is also an active social worker.
