= Gandhara University =

Coordinates: 33.9925°N 71.4808°E

- Motto in English: Knowledge is Vision
- Type: Private
- Established: 1995
- Affiliations: Higher Education Commission (Pakistan), Pakistan Medical and Dental Council, College of Physicians and Surgeons Pakistan
- Location: Peshawar, Khyber Pakhtunkhwa, Pakistan
- Colours: Green and white
- Website: gandhara.edu.pk

The Gandhara University is a private university located in Peshawar, Khyber Pakhtunkhwa, Pakistan. It is chartered by the Government of Khyber Pakhtunkhwa. Gandhara University was the first private medical university of Khyber Pakhtunkhwa. It provides specialized training in the health sciences. The institutes that became Gandhara University were initially founded in October 1995 by surgeon Muhammad Kabir. University is recognized by the Higher Education Commission (Pakistan) and accredited by the Pakistan Medical and Dental Council. It is also affiliated with the College of Physicians and Surgeons Pakistan for postgraduate dental courses.

== Constituent colleges ==
The university encompasses specialized departments to include teaching in medicine, dentistry, pharmacy, paramedical technologies, nursing, physiotherapy and public health. These include:

- Kabir Medical College (which offers degree in MBBS)
- Sardar Begum Dental College (which offers degree in BDS)
- Naseer Teaching Hospital
- Gandhara College of Pharmacy
- Wazid Muhammad Institute of Paramedical Technology
- Farkhanda Institute of Nursing
- Kabir Institute of Public Health

== Journal ==
The Journal of Gandhara Medical and Dental Sciences (JGMDS) is recognized by the Higher Education Commission (HEC), Pakistan, and the official journal of Gandhara University Peshawar, Pakistan.
