= Sharif Medical and Dental College =

Medical college in Punjab, Pakistan

Sharif Medical & Dental College
- شریف طبی اور دندان سازی کالج
- Motto: Success through perseverance
- Type: Private
- Established: 2007
- Principal: Prof. Dr. Nausheen Raza (HOD Anatomy)
- Location: Lahore, Punjab, Pakistan
- Colours: Blue & gold
- Affiliations: College of Physicians and Surgeons of Pakistan; University of Health Sciences, Lahore
- Website: Sharif Medical City official website

Sharif Medical and Dental College is a private medical college in Lahore, Punjab, Pakistan. Sharif Medical City Hospital is the teaching hospital of this college.

== Recognition and affiliation ==
- Accredited by the College of Physicians and Surgeons of Pakistan
- Affiliated with the University of Health Sciences, Lahore

== Overview ==
The college was established in 2007. Equipped with one of the best campuses in Punjab, SMDC is ranked as third among private medical and dental colleges of Punjab, in terms of results it has produced.
