= Islamabad Medical and Dental College =

College in Pakistan

Islamabad Medical & Dental College
- اسلام آباد طبی و دندان سازی کالج
- Motto: Providing a Base to Serve Humanity
- Type: Private university, school of medicine and dentistry
- Established: 2007; 19 years ago
- Affiliations: Shaheed Zulfiqar Ali Bhutto Medical University; Pakistan Medical and Dental Council
- Chairman: Ghulam Akbar Khan Niazi
- Dean: Dr. Khalid Hassan
- Students: 500 (MBBS) and 250 (BDS)
- Location: Islamabad, Pakistan; 33.75550079060606°N 73.20996631754944°E
- Campus: 7.5 acres (3 ha)
- Website: Official website
- Location within Islamabad Capital Territory

Islamabad Medical and Dental College (Urdu: اسلام آباد طبی و دندان سازی کالج) is a private medical and dental college located in Islamabad, Pakistan. It has a campus spread over 3 hectares (7.5 acres) at the foothills of the Margalla Hills. The college gives admission to 100 MBBS, 50 BDS, and 4 MDS students each year.

== Affiliations ==
Islamabad Medical and Dental College is affiliated with Shaheed Zulfiqar Ali Bhutto Medical University and is recognized by the Pakistan Medical and Dental Council and the Ministry of Health. The college is listed in the International Medical Education Directory and WHO Directory of Medical Schools.

The college had three attached teaching hospitals: Social Security Hospital, Ahmed Medical Complex, and St Joseph's Hospice, Rawalpindi. The college has also been working with its own new multi-disciplinary 500-650 bed hospital, Dr. Akbar Niazi Teaching Hospital, located beside the college building. The hospital offers services in various medical and surgical specialties including cardiology, dermatology, nephrology, psychiatry, ophthalmology, obstetrics and gynaecology, urology, general surgery, otorhinolaryngology, neurosurgery, bone marrow transplant (BMT) as well as outpatient department (OPD), inpatient department (IPD), and executive clinics. The hospital also offers training programs in medicine.

The college is affiliated with its own dentistry hospital, Islamabad Dental Hospital located in Bhara Kahu, main Murree Road, Islamabad. The hospital specializes in treating patients of various sub-branches of dentistry including maxillofacial surgery, oral medicine, and periodontology.

== See also ==
- List of schools of medicine in Pakistan
