= Pakistan Institute of Medical Sciences =

Hospital and medical institute in Islamabad, Pakistan

Coordinates: 33°42′N 73°03′E

- Capital Administration and Development Division
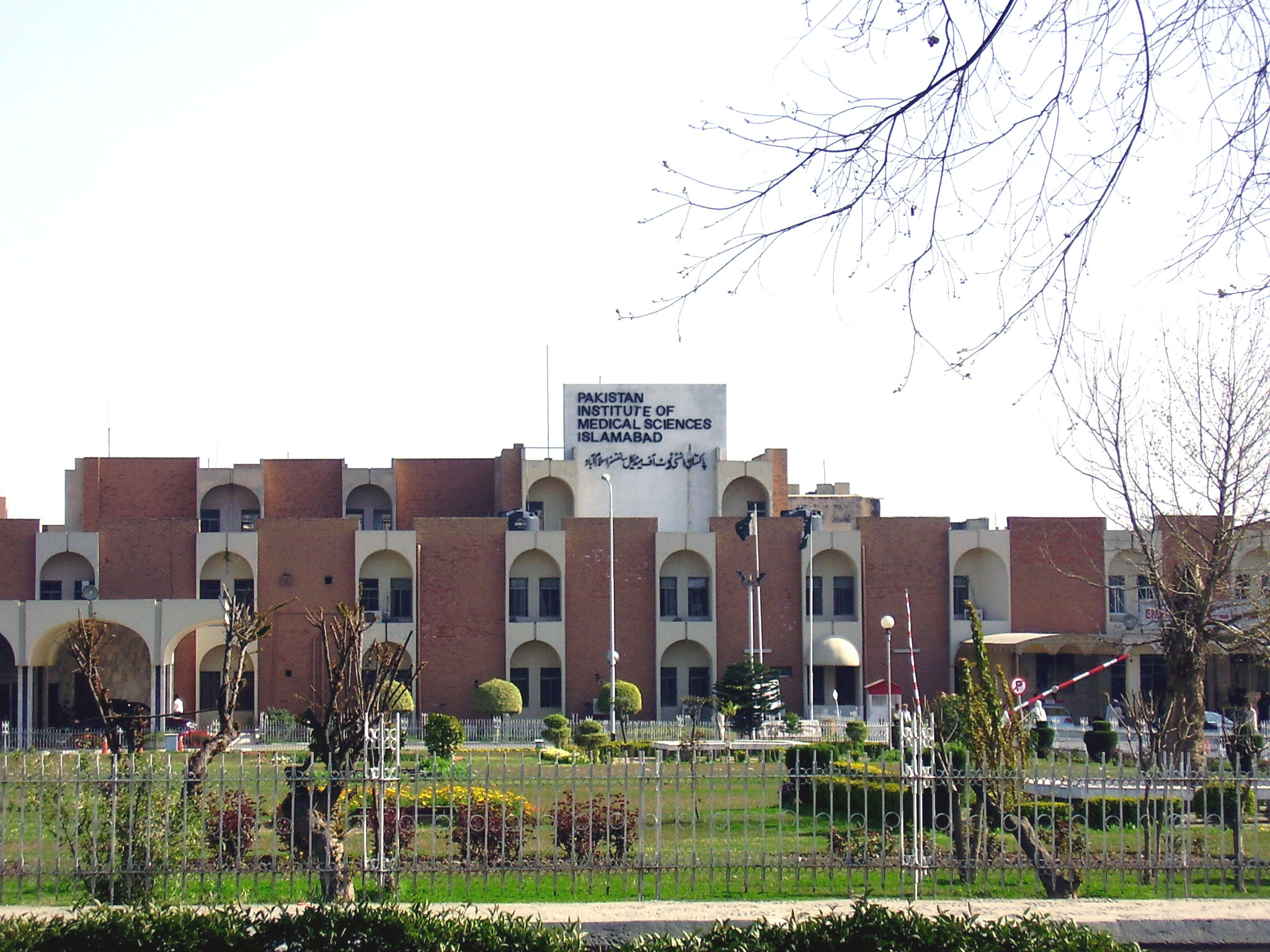
- PIMS (Main building)

Geography
- Location: Islamabad, Pakistan

Organisation
- Type: Teaching
- Affiliated university: Shaheed Zulfiqar Ali Bhutto Medical University
- Patron: Professor Dr. Rana Imran Sikandar

Services
- Emergency department: Yes

Helipads
- Helipad: Yes

History
- Founded: 1985

Links
- Website: https://pims.gov.pk
- Lists: Hospitals in Pakistan

Pakistan Institute of Medical Sciences (انسٹی ٹیوٹ علوم طبی پاکستان) is a research oriented health sciences institute located in Islamabad, Pakistan.

It is one of the region's leading tertiary level hospitals which includes 22 medical and surgical specialist centers. It provides medical training through the Quaid-e-Azam Postgraduate Medical College which was established on 1 February 1989.

Later on Shaheed Zulfiqar Ali Bhutto Medical University was established through act of parliament in 2013. The first vice chancellor was professor Dr. Javed Akram who served till 2018.

== History ==
Established in 1985 the institute includes three semi-autonomous hospitals including the Islamabad Hospital (IH) which is a 592-bed hospital spread over 3.5 hectares, the 230 bedded Children's Hospital spread over 1.6 hectares specializing in pediatric care and the 125 bedded Maternal & Child Health Care Centre which specializes in obstetrics and gynecology.

On 26 August 2026, a fire broke out at the hospital's maternity ward, killing 14 infants.

== PIMS nursery fire ==
On 26 August 2026, a fire broke out in the neonatal intensive care unit of the Mother and Child Health ward at the Pakistan Institute of Medical Sciences (PIMS) in Islamabad, Pakistan. Fourteen newborns died in the incident, while one infant was rescued. An inquiry was subsequently launched into the cause of the fire and the hospital's fire-safety and emergency procedures.

== Hospital departments ==
The medical care departments of the institute are:

- Anesthesia
- Blood Bank
- Burn Center
- Cardiology
- Critical Care
- Dentistry
- Dermatology
- General Medicine
- E.N.T.
- Gastroenterology
- Gynecology
- Neonatology
- Nephrology
- Neurology
- Neurosurgery
- Oncology
- Ophthalmology
- Pathology
- Plastic Surgery
- Psychiatry
- Pulmonology
- Radiology
- Rheumatology
- General surgery-I
- Urology
- Infectious disease

=== Treatment of patients ===
In 2018, according to PIMS Gastroenterology Department, there was a 30 per cent increase in patients at this hospital compared to the number of patients in 2016-17.

== Components ==
- Islamabad Hospital (IH)
- Children’s Hospital (CH)
- Mother & Child Health Care Center
- Burn Care Center
- Cardiac Center
- Stroke Center
- Breast Cancer Screening Center
- Bone Marrow Transplant Unit
- Thalassemia Unit (Adult/Pediatrics)

== Teaching institutes ==
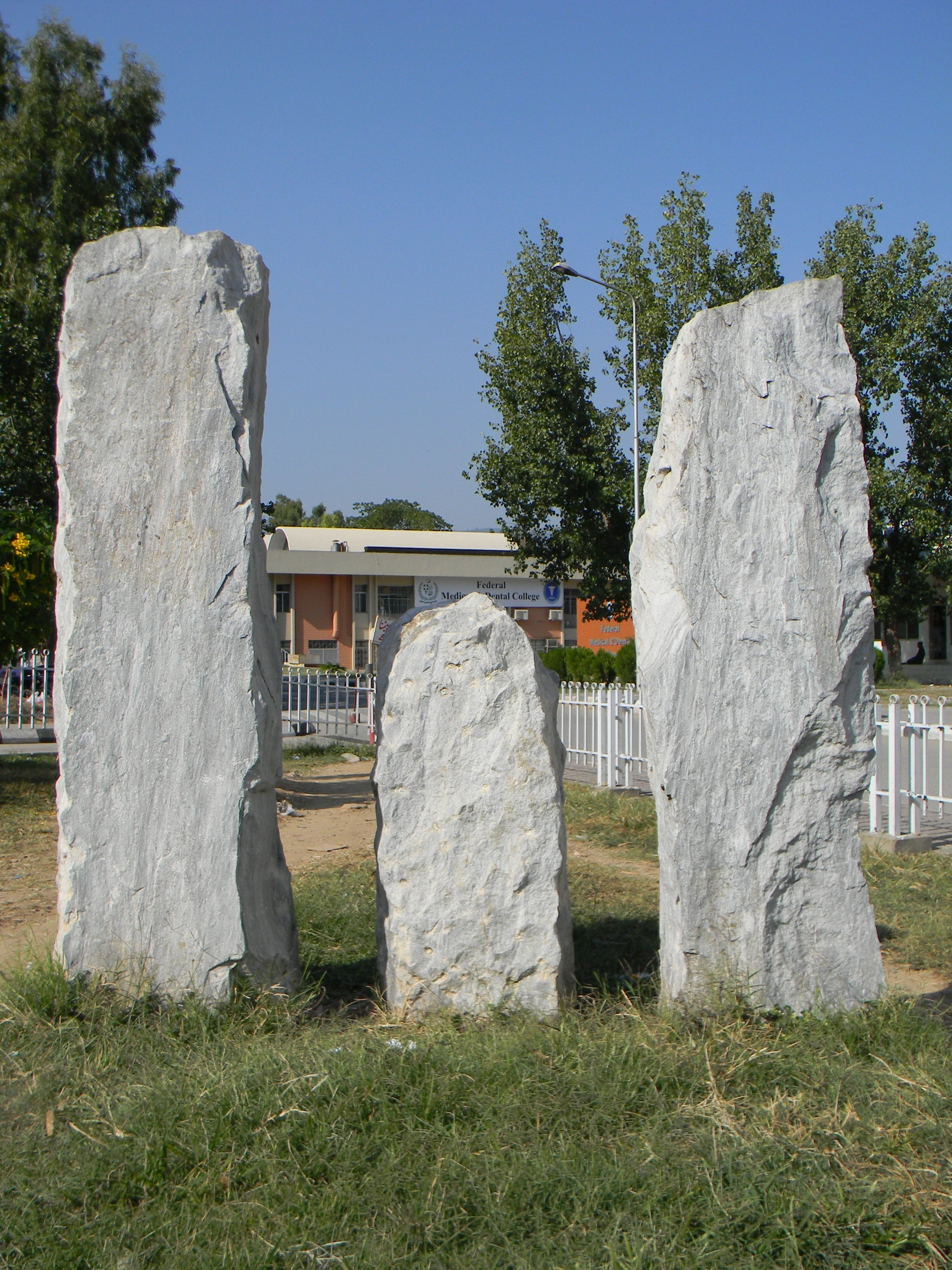
Parent Memorial in Children Hospital, PIMS

The Medical colleges and school affiliated with the institute are:

- Quaid-e-Azam Postgraduate Medical College
- Federal Medical & Dental College
- College of Nursing (offer 02 year Post RN B.Sc, 04 year Generic BS Nursing and 01 year specialize Nsg courses in 07 sub-specialties)
- School of Nursing
- School of Dentistry
