= Community genetics =

Genetic interactions between species and their abiotic environment

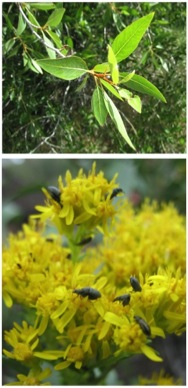
Populus angustifolia leaves, and Solidago sp. flowers with associated arthropods. Members of these two plant genera are model systems in community genetics research.

Community genetics is a recently emerged field in biology that fuses elements of community ecology, evolutionary biology, and molecular and quantitative genetics. Antonovics first articulated the vision for such a field, and Whitham et al. formalized its definition as "The study of the genetic interactions that occur between species and their abiotic environment in complex communities." The field aims to bridge the gaps in the study of evolution and ecology, within the multivariate community context in which ecological and evolutionary features are embedded. The documentary movie A Thousand Invisible Cords provides an introduction to the field and its implications.

To date, the primary focus of most community genetics studies has been on the influences of genetic variation in plants on foliar arthropod communities. In a wide variety of ecosystems, different plant genotypes often support different compositions of associated foliar arthropod communities. Such community phenotypes have been observed in natural hybrid complexes, among genotypes and sibling families within a single species and among different plant populations. To understand the broader impacts of differences among plant genotypes on biodiversity as a whole, researchers have begun to examine the response of other organisms, such as foliar endophytes, mycorrhizal fungi, soil microbes, litter-dwelling arthropods, herbaceous plants and epiphytes. These effects are frequently examined with foundation species in temperate ecosystems, who structure ecosystems by modulating and stabilizing resources and ecosystem processes. The emphasis on foundation species allows researchers to focus on the likely most important players in a system without becoming overwhelmed by the complexity of all the genetically variable interactions occurring at the same time. However, unique effects of plant genotypes have also been found with non-foundation species, and can occur in tropical, boreal and alpine systems.

The vision for the field of community genetics extends beyond documentation of different communities on different genotypes of a focal species. Other aspects of this field include

- understanding how species interactions within a community are modulated by host genotype,
- implications of host genotype on the fitness and evolution of community members, and
- selection on hosts influencing associated communities.

Future progress in the field of community genetics is strongly dependent on breakthroughs in modern molecular DNA-based technology, such as genome sequencing. The application of a community genetics approach to understanding how species and communities of interacting organisms are reacting to rapid changes in climate, as well as informing restoration, are two important applied aspects of community genetics.
