= Ziauddin University =

University in Karachi, Pakistan

- جامعہ ضیاء الدین
- Other names: ZU
- Type: Private
- Established: 1986
- Parent institution: Dr. Ziauddin Hospitals
- Accreditation: Higher Education Commission; Pakistan Bar Council; Pakistan Medical Commission; Pakistan Engineering Council; Pharmacy Council of Pakistan; Pakistan Nursing Council
- Chancellor: Asim Hussain
- Vice-Chancellor: Muhammad Inayatullah Khan
- Registrar: Engr. Capt.(R) Syed Waqar Hussain
- Location: Karachi, Sindh, Pakistan
- Campus: Urban
- Colours: Green and grey
- Website: zu.edu.pk

The Ziauddin University (ZU) (Urdu: جامعہ ضیاء الدین) is a private university located in Karachi, Sindh, Pakistan. The university is named after the educationist, Ziauddin Ahmad.

== History ==
Established in 1986, Ziauddin University was founded in the memory of Sir Dr. Ziauddin Ahmad by his daughter and son-in-law. The School of Nursing was founded in 1986 and is accredited by the Pakistan Nursing Council. The institution became the College of Nursing in 2009, and since then, it has offered a variety of graduate and undergraduate programmes. The Sindh government approved the creation of the Dr. Ziauddin Post Graduate Institute of Medical Sciences in August 1994.

The Ziauddin Medical University received its charter as Ziauddin University on 13 December 2005, under the name 'The Ziauddin University' (Amendment ACT 2003).

== Recognition ==
Ziauddin University is recognized and accredited by the Higher Education Commission of Pakistan.

The Ziauddin University is a university chartered under The Ziauddin Medical University Act, 1995 that has been amended twice under The Ziauddin University (Amendment) Act, 2018 and The Ziauddin University (Amendment) Act, 2021.

== List of colleges, faculties, and schools ==
- Ziauddin Medical College
- College of Dentistry
- College of Pharmacy
- College of Nursing
- College of Medical Technology
- College of Rehabilitation sciences
- College of Speech-Language & Hearing Sciences
- College of Media Sciences
- College of Education
- Faculty of Law, Politics & Governance
- Faculty of Engineering Science & Technology

== Dr. Ziauddin Hospitals ==
The university also operates a chain of hospitals named Dr. Ziauddin Hospitals and Health TV.

The services provided at hospitals are X-Ray and Ultrasound, MRI, CT scan, Digital Subtraction Angiography, Colour Doppler Mammography and Interventional Radiology. A COVID-19 ward was set up at the hospital in 2020.

=== Campuses ===
- Cancer Hospital, Block-B, North Nazimabad.
- Dr. Ziauddin Hospital, Shahrah-e-Ghalib, Clifton.
- Dr. Ziauddin Hospital, Behind KPT Hospital, Keamari.
- Dr. Ziauddin Hospital, Block III, Gole Market, Nazimabad.
- Dr. Ziauddin Hospital, Block-B, North Nazimabad.
