= Shaheed Zulfiqar Ali Bhutto Medical University =

University in Islamabad, Pakistan

- جامعۂ طبی شهید ذوالفقار علی بھٹو
- Type: Public
- Established: 2013
- Affiliations: Higher Education Commission (Pakistan), Pakistan Medical Commission, College of Physicians and Surgeons Pakistan
- Chancellor: President of Pakistan
- Vice-Chancellor: Prof. Dr. Tanwir Khaliq
- Location: Islamabad, Pakistan
- Nickname: SZABMU
- Website: szabmu.edu.pk

The Shaheed Zulfiqar Ali Bhutto Medical University (SZABMU) is a public university in Islamabad, Pakistan. Established on 21 March 2013, it offers undergraduate and postgraduate courses of medicine, surgery, dentistry, basic medical sciences and allied health professions.

== Constituent Institutions ==
- Federal Medical College (Offers MBBS)
- School of Dentistry (Offers BDS)
- PIMS School of Nursing (offers BSN)
- PIMS College of Nursing (offers BSN and speciality courses)
- PIMS College of Medical Technology (offers HSSC & BS in various Medical Courses)

== Affiliated Institutions ==
- Rawal Institute of Health Sciences
- Yusra Medical and Dental College
- HBS Medical and Dental College
- Islamabad Medical and Dental College
- Bashir Institute of Health Science
- Prime Institute of Health Sciences
- Islamabad Institute of Health Sciences
- Institute of Health and Management Sciences
- Aman Medical Institute Islamabad
