= Dow International Medical College =

Medical school in Karachi, Pakistan

Coordinates: 24.9438°N 67.1372°E

- ڈاؤ بین الاقوامی طبی کالج
- Other name: DIMC
- Motto in English: Prevention Is Better than Cure
- Type: Public Sector University, Government of Pakistan
- Established: 2007
- Affiliations: Dow University of Health Sciences
- Academic affiliations: HEC, PMRC, PMDC, IMED
- Chancellor: Imran Ismail (Governor of Sindh & Chancellor)
- Vice-Chancellor: Saeed Quraishay
- Rector: Zarnaz Wahid
- Principal: Prof. Dr. Iftikhar Ahmed
- Location: Karachi-74000, Sindh, Pakistan
- Campus: Urban
- Website: www.duhs.edu.pk

Dow International Medical College (Urdu: ڈاؤ بین القوامی طبی کالج) is a government-owned public sector medical college in Karachi, Sindh, Pakistan, which is recognised by the Pakistan Medical and Dental Council (PMDC). Admittance is limited to 150 students per year. It is a constituent college of Dow University of Health Sciences.

It is the only public sector medical college in Pakistan having its own liver transplant unit in addition to the other clinical services. Dow International Medical College is also fully recognized for FCPS postgraduate training in various disciplines including general surgery, orthopaedic surgery, thoracic surgery, gynaecology and obstetrics, ENT, ophthalmology, general medicine, gastroenterology, endocrinology, pulmonology, radiology and haematology by College of Physicians and Surgeons, Pakistan.

== Introduction ==
Dow International Medical College (DIMC) was established in 2007 as a constituent college of Dow University of Health Sciences in Karachi, Pakistan. DIMC was established to facilitate medical education for students residing both in Pakistan and all over the world. Currently, Dow International Medical College admits up to 150 M.B.B.S. students per year. DIMC follows the semester system as per the directives of the Pakistan Medical and Dental Council. An integrated modular curriculum has been adopted by Dow University of Health Sciences since 2009. The DIMC is included in WHO directory and IMED-FAIMER. Recently, DIMC has established its dental section which has been allowed by PMDC to admit 50 BDS students per year. The college building is a new facility with a constructed area of 19,000 m^{2} (200,000 sq ft). The college has five laboratories including the Power Lab Anatomy and Forensic Museum, Dow Animal House harboring horses, rats and mice of different type strains, rabbits, monkeys and snakes for research purposes, skill lab for undergraduates and postgraduates and Professional Development Centre for faculty development & training. The college has a three storied library, digital library, reading room & video conferencing room.

== Teaching hospitals ==
DIMC currently has two affiliated teaching hospitals. At Ojha Campus, the medical college has grown its clinical services through Dow University Hospital with an OPD Block with clinics of medicine and its allied and surgery and its allied disciplines. Diagnostic and Research Facilities of the college have gained a great deal of attention in Pakistan. These facilities were established by building the Dow Diagnostic Research and Reference Laboratories and Radio Diagnostic Complex. Two institutes, National Institute of Liver & Gastrointestinal Diseases and National Institute of Diabetes and Endocrinology are not only providing medical education to students but also providing diagnostic and treatment services to patients.

Teaching units for Dow International Medical College within the same Ojha campus are: 1) Dow University General Hospital (600 beds) and ICU (100 beds) 2) Ojha Institute of Chest diseases (250 beds) 3) National Institute of Diabetes and Endocrinology 5) National Institute of Liver and Gastrointestinal Diseases with liver transplant unit. 6) Renal Transplant Unit. 7) Center for Surgical Oncology.

== History ==
Dow International Medical College was planned at its current Ojha campus by Dow University of Health Sciences in 2005. The project was approved thereafter by Higher Education Commission (HEC). In 2007 the college was up and running in an old block after renovations in accordance with International Standards in all respects. In December 2009 DIMC was shifted into the newly constructed complex which covers a total area of 16,300 m^{2} (175,000 sq ft). This building has ten lecture halls each having a capacity of 280 students. In 2011, the Dental section was started in the same building which is also approved by Pakistan Medical and Dental Council (PMDC) for admission of 50 students per year for BDS course.

== Facilities ==
On-campus housing in the form of male and female hostels have round-the-clock security, power, and gas. Extracurricular activities including outdoor and indoor recreational sports among the students are facilitated by a large cricket ground & state of the art Gymnasium.

== International recognition ==
Dow Medical College as well as its sister campus Dow International Medical College are recognised by the World Health Organization and are included in the International Medical Education Directory (IMED).

The IMED provides a source of information about international medical schools, recognised by appropriate Government agencies (usually Ministry of Health) of the countries where the medical schools are located. These schools are subsequently recognised and listed by International Medical Education Directory (IMED).

== See also ==
- Dow University of Health Sciences
