= Riphah International University =

University in Pakistan

Riphah International University, Islamabad
- Established: 2002
- Affiliations: Pakistan Engineering Council; Higher Education Commission (Pakistan); Washington Accord
- Chancellor: Hassan Muhammad Khan
- Vice-Chancellor: Anis Ahmad
- Rector: Ghulam Abbas Miana
- Students: 12000
- Location: Islamabad
- Campus: urban
- Colours: Blue and White
- Nickname: riphah
- Website: www.riphah.edu.pk

Riphah International University is a private university in Pakistan, chartered by the Federal Government of Pakistan in 2002.

It is sponsored by the not-for-profit Islamic International Medical College Trust (IIMCT). The first project of the IIMCT was the Islamic International Medical College in Rawalpindi, established in 1996 by its founding managing trustee, Zulfiqar Ali Khan. The university has 14 constituent units and an overseas project, the RAK College of Dental Sciences, in the United Arab Emirates. The university is also working towards the establishment of a campus in Mauritius.

== Governance ==
The president of Pakistan is the patron of the university. Zulfiqar Ali Khan was the founding chancellor and Hassan Muhammad Khan is the pro-chancellor of the university. Educationist Anis Ahmad is the founding vice-chancellor of the university. The board of governors and the academic council are the highest policy-making bodies of the university. The vice-chancellor is the chief executive and academic officer of the university.

== Faculties ==
The university consists of several colleges with undergraduate, graduate, and postgraduate programmes:

- Islamic International Dental College
- Islamic International Engineering College
- Islamic International Medical College
- Riphah College of Rehabilitation Sciences
- Riphah Institute of Pharmaceutical Sciences
- Riphah Institute of Media Sciences
- Faculty of Computing
- Riphah Center of Islamic Business
- Riphah Institute of Informatics
- Riphah School of Leadership
- Riphah Institute of Systems Engineering
- Faculty of Basic Sciences
- Faculty of Social Sciences & Humanities
- Riphah Institute of Public Policy
- Riphah College of Veterinary Sciences (RCVetS), established in 2012. The college offers a five years Doctor of Veterinary Medicine (DVM) degree besides other short courses, and is accredited by the Pakistan Veterinary Medical Council (PVMC) and Higher Education Commission of Pakistan (HEC).
