= Baqai Medical University =

Private university in Karachi, Pakistan

- جامعہَ بقائی برائے علومِ طبابت
- Motto: Education of modern health sciences to serve humanity.
- Type: Private university
- Established: 1989
- Founders: Prof. Dr. Fareed Uddin Baqai
- Affiliations: Higher Education Commission of Pakistan; Pakistan Medical and Dental Council
- Chancellor: Dr. Shoaib Baqai
- Vice-Chancellor: Professor Dr. Iftikhar Ahmed
- Location: Karachi, Pakistan
- Website: Official website

Baqai Medical University (Urdu: جامعہَ بقائی برائے علومِ طبابت) is a higher education institution located on M-9, Super Highway, Karachi, Pakistan.

== Recognised university ==
It was founded in 1989 and is ranked number 7 in the Higher Education Commission of Pakistan rankings for medical universities in Pakistan as of 2013. It is also recognised by the Pakistan Medical and Dental Council.

== History ==
Dr Fariduddin Baqai and his wife Dr Zahida Baqai were medical practitioners and surgeons who had been educated in Pakistan and the United Kingdom. They began to practice in Karachi, which at that time was the capital. In the late 1960s, the Baqais started a private sector hospital in Nazimabad, Karachi: the Baqai Hospital Nazimabad which later became a general hospital with 350 beds and modern facilities aimed at middle-income private patients, also doing charitable work.

In 1976, the Baqai Foundation acquired land on the outskirts of Karachi, on the M-9 Super Highway and founded the Baqai Medical Complex.

The Baqais convinced the government that health delivery could be through a programme of community-oriented medical education. This stimulated them to plan a medical college. In 1988, the first MBBS students were admitted, although it was not until 1990 that the Pakistan Medical and Dental Council formally permitted the college to start clinical teaching at Baqai Hospital, Nazimabad. In 1992, the Baqai Foundation went on to establish the Baqai Dental College for the city of Karachi.

== Institutions ==
The institutions of the university include:

- Baqai Medical College
- Baqai Dental College
- Baqai College of Veterinary Sciences
- Baqai Cadet College
- Baqai Institute of Pharmaceutical Sciences
- Baqai Institute of Health Management Sciences
- Baqai Institute of Hematology
- Baqai Institute of Medical Technology
- Baqai Institute of Diabetology and Endocrinology
- Baqai Institute of Chest Diseases
- Baqai Institute of Cardiovascular Diseases
- Baqai Institute of Reproduction and Developmental Sciences
- Department of Social Obstetrics
- Baqai Institute of Information Technology
- Baqai Institute of Physical Therapy

== Admissions ==
Merit is the only criterion for admission. There are no quotas, reserved places or places based on donations. In establishing merit, entrance tests, interviews, extra curricular activities and school records are used.

== Faculty ==
Grants and scholarships are provided for faculty members to travel abroad to seminars and conferences and for higher education. The university has a programme of education through its Centre for Medical Education.
