= Isra University =

University in Hyderabad, Pakistan

Coordinates: 25.4350°N 68.3822°E

- جامعہ اسراء
- Motto: A Hallmark of the Future
- Type: Private
- Established: 1997
- Affiliations: HEC
- Chancellor: Hameedullah Kazi
- Vice-Chancellor: Ahmed Waliullah Kazi
- Location: Hyderabad, Sindh, Pakistan
- Website: Official website

Isra University (Sindhi: اسرا يونيورسٽي; Urdu: جامعہ اسراء) is a private university, legislated by the Isra University Act of 1997 [Sindh Act No. V of 1997], located in Hyderabad, Sindh, Pakistan. It is a non-profit organization owned by the Isra Islamic Foundation and certified by the Pakistan Centre for Philanthropy (PCP). The university offers programs in medicine and allied medical sciences, dentistry and allied sciences, engineering science, technology, commerce, economics, management sciences, and nursing.

Isra University is located next to the National Highway, 5 km from Hyderabad City Center. It is accessible from the surrounding areas of Gudu and Jamshoro via the Hyderabad bypass, and Latifabad, Mirpurkhas, and Badin via the channel bypass. The National Highway connects it to the north of Sindh province. The campus covers 10 acres (40,000 m^{2}) of land.

== History ==
Isra University started with 30 students in 1997, and in 2016 it has more than 3,500 students.

== Accreditation ==
Isra University's programs in Engineering Science & Technology have been accredited by the Pakistan Engineering Council Islamabad as of October 2010.

Al-Tibri Medical College and Hospital, located in Karachi, is affiliated with Isra University. Al Nafees Medical College, Islamabad is also affiliated with Isra University.

== Degrees ==
Degrees offered by Isra University:

=== Faculty of Medicine & Allied Medical Sciences (FM&AMS) ===
- Bachelor of Medicine, Bachelor of Surgery
- Bachelor of Science in Nursing
- Doctor of Physical Therapy
- Diploma in Healthcare Assistance
- Master of Public Health
- M. Phil (Anatomy Biochemistry, Physiology, Pathology, Community, Medicine, Histopathology, Chemical, Microbiology, Pharmacology, Hematology, Prosthetics and Orthotics )
- Ph. D (Anatomy, Biochemistry, Physiology, Pharmacology, Hematology, Microbiology, Histopathology)
- Doctor of Medicine (Internal Medicine, Pediatrics, Cardiology, Neurology, Radiology, Dermatology, Nephrology, Gastroenterology)
- Master of Surgery (General Surgery, Ophthalmology, Gynaecology, Obstetrics, Anaesthesiology)

=== Faculty of Dentistry (FD) ===
- Bachelor of Dental Surgery
- Master of Dental Surgery (Oral & Maxillofacial Surgery, Oral Pathology, Operative Dentistry)
- M.Sc. (Oral & Maxillo facial Surgery, Oral Pathology, Operative Dentistry)
- M.Phil. (Oral Anatomy, Community Dentistry, Science of Dental Material)

=== Faculty of Engineering Science & Technology (FES & T) ===
- Bachelor of Engineering (Mechanical)
- Bachelor of Engineering (Electrical)
- Bachelor of Science (Computer Science)
- Bachelor of Science (Information & Communication Technology)
- Bachelor of Science (Software Engineering)
- Bachelor of Science (Telecommunication)
- Bachelor of Science (Electronics)
- Bachelor of Technology (Electrical, Electronics, Civil & Biomedical)
- Bachelor of Technology (Electrical, Electronics, Civil & Biomedical)
- Associate of Applied Science (Software Engineering, Electronics, Telecommunication)
- M.S (Computer Science, Computational Mathematics, Information Technology, Telecommunication, Electrical Engineering, Computer Engineering)
- M. Phil (Computer Science, Computational Mathematics, Information Technology, Telecommunication, Electrical Engineering, Computer Engineering)
- Ph. D (Computer Science, Computational Mathematics, Information Technology, Telecommunication, Electrical Engineering, Computer Engineering)

=== Faculty of Commerce Economics and Management Science (FCE&MS) ===
- Bachelor of Business Administration
- Bachelor of Science (Commerce)
- Bachelor of Science (Economics)
- Associate of Applied Science (Business Administration)
- Master of Science (Commerce, Economics)
- MBA (Healthcare & Hospital Management, Hotel Management, Marketing, Banking & Finance, or Human Resource Management)
- M.Phil. (Healthcare & Hospital Management, Hotel Management, Marketing, Banking & Finance, or Human Resource Management)
- Ph.D. (Healthcare & Hospital Management, Hotel Management, Marketing, Banking & Finance, or Human Resource Management)

== Academic environment ==
The academic environment and examination patterns vary between each department. The Departments of Commerce, Economics, Management Science, Engineering Science and Technology, and Dentistry use the semester system. The Departments of Medicine and Physiotherapy follow an annual system. Each department has its own exam schedule, grading system and follows its own yearly academic calendar.

The university offers extra-curricular activities such as sports, debate, essay writing, and computer gaming competitions, and hosts an annual picnic.
