= Pakistan Nursing Council =

Nursing licensing organization in Pakistan

The Pakistan Nursing Council ( شورای پرستاری پاکستان ) is a Pakistani regulatory body established in 1948 under the Pakistan Nursing Council Act (1952, 1973). PNC is empowered to license nurses, midwives, lady health visitors (LHVs) and nursing auxiliaries to practice nursing throughout the country.

== See also ==
- Nursing in Pakistan
