= University of Health Sciences, Lahore =

Public university in Lahore, Pakistan

- Type: Public
- Established: 2 October 2002
- Accreditation: Higher Education Commission (Pakistan); Pakistan Medical and Dental Council; Pakistan Nursing Council; Pharmacy Council of Pakistan; College of Physicians and Surgeons Pakistan
- Vice-Chancellor: Ahsan Waheed Rathore
- Faculty: Farakh Iqbal
- Students: 116073
- Undergraduates: 106916
- Postgraduates: 9157
- Location: Lahore, Punjab, Pakistan; 31.5068°N 74.3098°E
- Website: uhs.edu.pk

The University of Health Sciences, Lahore (Note: Punjabi: یونیورسٹی صحتی علوم لہور; Urdu: جامعہ طبی علوم لاہور) (abbr. UHS Lahore) is a graduate, affiliating public university located in Lahore, Punjab, Pakistan.

== Overview ==
University of health sciences, Lahore is an internationally recognized, student centered research university with a mission of improvement of health care delivery to the populace. It regulates and coordinates the activities of medical education, training and research institutions throughout Punjab. It also conducts Medical and Dental College Admission Test (also known as MDCAT) every year for admission in MBBS and BDS degree programs in public and private medical and dental colleges of Punjab.

It was placed second in Higher Education Commission (Pakistan)'s national university rankings for 2012 in medical and health sciences universities and eighth in 'Overall Top Ten Higher Education Institutions' category of universities in Pakistan.

== Departments ==
- Anatomy Department
- Institute of Allied Health Sciences
- Biochemistry Department
- Human Genetics & Molecular Biology Department
- Haematology Department
- Immunology Department
- Microbiology Department
- Histopathology Department
- Nursing & Post Graduate Education Department
- Physiology Department
- Pharmacology Department
- Forensic Medicine/Medical Jurisprudence
- Chemical Pathology Department
- I.L.E.M UHS
- Oral Pathology Department
- Oral Biology Department
- Family Medicine Department
- Medical Education Department
- Public Health Department
- Centre for Happiness and Well-Being
- Behavioural Sciences
- Physical Therapy

== Courses offered ==
The university offers graduate level courses in medicine, dentistry, pharmacy, nursing, allied health sciences and biomedical engineering. Undergraduate level courses in medicine and dentistry are offered in affiliating campuses only. No private university or degree awarding institute (DAI) in Punjab is allowed to offer undergraduate degrees in medicine (MBBS) and dentistry (BDS) without affiliation to the University of Health Sciences, Lahore.

== Status ==
University of Health Sciences, Lahore

University of Health Sciences, Lahore was inaugurated by General Pervaiz Musharraf, former president of Pakistan on October 2, 2002. At this university, worldwide-recognized edges and disciplines are offered similar to that in Europe and United States. Degrees awarded are recognized by the Higher Education Commission (HEC) and accredited by the professional councils such as Pakistan Medical and Dental Council (PMDC), Pakistan Nursing Council (PNC) and Pharmacy Council of Pakistan (PCP). Postgraduate training in medicine and dentistry is affiliated with the College of Physicians and Surgeons Pakistan (CPSP).

It was awarded "Best Educational Institute in Healthcare" by World Education Congress Asia.

== Research ==
University of Health Sciences, Lahore is a research-intensive university. Its ethos from its beginning has been to produce highly relevant research that solves real health problems and improve people's quality of life.

Students of Sargodha Medical College with Vice Chancellor UHS

At present, extensive on-campus research is going on in 183 areas including Asthma, Diabetes, Tuberculosis, Typhoid, Infertility, Environmental Pollution, various types of Cancer, Genetic Disorders, Consanguinity, DNA Analysis, Developmental Abnormalities, Metabolic Syndromes, Hepatitis B and C, Liver and Renal Disorders.

A high-tech resource lab and an experimental research lab (Animal House) have been established for research purposes.

== Library ==
The university library acts as a resource center. Latest editions of medical books are acquired to cater the information needs of students and faculty with access to HEC digital library with more than 23,000 online journals with full text/abstracts and 40,000 online books. A reference service is provided to students especially using MEDLINE and MEDLAR databases.

== International collaboration ==
Within a short time of its formation, university has developed collaboration with several international institutes. Prominent among them are Duke University, University of Texas Houston, University of Pittsburgh, Centers for Disease Control and Prevention (CDC) United States, University of Liverpool, University of Glasgow, University of Nottingham, University of Reims Champagne-Ardenne and University of Münster.

In July 2019, Javed Akram, Vice Chancellor of University of Health Sciences, Lahore signed the 'Kunming Declaration' to become founder member of 'South and Southeast Asian Medical Education and Service Alliance (SSAMESA).

== Controversy ==
In 2017, it came under severe criticism when its entry test MDCAT got leaked. According to Federal Investigation Agency (FIA) report, some of the staff members were involved in the paper leakage and had been doing it for the past several years. Lahore High Court ordered for retake of the test.

== See also ==
- King Edward Medical University, Lahore
- Fatima Jinnah Medical University, Lahore
- Faisalabad Medical University
- Rawalpindi Medical University
- Nishtar Medical University, Multan
- Dow University of Health Sciences, Karachi
- List of medical schools in Pakistan
- List of universities in Pakistan
- Quaid-e-Azam Medical College, Bahwalpur
- Ameer-ud-din Medical College Lahore
