= College of Physicians and Surgeons Pakistan =

Regulatory college to oversee postgraduate medical education

- Abbreviation: CPSP
- Established: 1962; 64 years ago
- Founder: Wajid Ali Khan Burki
- Type: Public, Regulatory college
- Headquarters: Karachi, Sindh Pakistan
- Members: MCPS, FCPS
- President: Khalid Masud Gondal
- Website: cpsp.edu.pk

The College of Physicians and Surgeons Pakistan (Urdu: طبیب و جراح کالج پاکستان, abbreviated as CPSP) is a regulatory college established in 1962 by a special act of the Parliament of Pakistan to oversee the postgraduate medical education and professional development. It offers certifications following postgraduate training in specialties of medicine, surgery and dentistry.

== History ==
The college was established in 1962 through an act of parliament, under the leadership of the then-Minister of Health Wajid Ali Khan Burki. In 1965, the Library of the College of Physicians and Surgeons Pakistan was established and since its inception has acquired latest medical literature and served as a focal point in supporting postgraduate medical education in the country. The CPSP started publishing Journal of the College of Physicians and Surgeons Pakistan in 1991.

== Regional campuses ==
The regional campuses of the CPSP are located in:

- Abbottabad
- Bahawalpur
- Faisalabad
- Hyderabad
- Islamabad
- Lahore
- Larkana
- Multan
- Muzaffarabad
- Nawabshah
- Peshawar
- Quetta
- Rawalpindi
- Riyadh, Saudi Arabia
- Kathmandu, Nepal

=== International training centres ===
- Various centres in the United Kingdom
- Internal Medicine at King Fahad Medical City, Riyadh, Saudi Arabia
- Anaesthesia, Emergency Medicine and Surgery with Medical Council of Ireland
- Nepal

== International Courses ==
It is the only institute in Pakistan which conducts official ATLS and ACS courses.

== Qualifications award ==
- Fellow of College of Physicians and Surgeons Pakistan (FCPS)
- Member of College of Physicians and Surgeons Pakistan (MCPS)

== See also ==
- Pakistan Medical & Dental Council
