= Pakistan Medical and Dental Council =

Government regulatory agency

- شورای طبی و دندانپزشکی پاکستان
- Abbreviation: PM&DC
- Formation: 1962; 64 years ago
- Headquarters: Mauve Area, Islamabad-44000
- Region served: Pakistan
- President: Prof. Dr. Rizwan Taj
- Parent organization: Ministry of National Health Services, Regulation and Coordination; Higher Education Commission (Pakistan)
- Employees: 232
- Website: pmdc.pk
- Formerly called: PMC (Pakistan Medical Commission)

Pakistan Medical and Dental Council is a statutory regulatory authority that maintains the official register of medical practitioners in Pakistan. Its chief function is to establish uniform minimum standards of basic and higher qualifications in medicine and dentistry throughout Pakistan. It also sets the education standards for medical colleges in Pakistan along with the Higher Education Commission.

== History ==
The Pakistan Medical Council was initially established in 1948 by adopting the British Indian Medical Council Act 1933 on the recommendations of the 1947 Pakistan Health Conference. It was later reorganized under the Pakistan Medical Council Act 1951 whereby each province has its own medical council. In 1957, the West Pakistan Medical Council was formed by merging the Sindh Medical Council and the Punjab Medical Council. The Pakistan Medical Council Ordinance 1962 established the present-day Pakistan Medical and Dental Council as a statutory body in 1962 and all provincial councils were dissolved. Three amendments were passed thereafter as the Medical and Dental Council (Amendment) Act in 1973, 1999 and 2012. In 2019, President Arif Alvi passed a law, creating a new body named Pakistan Medical Council (PMC) and dissolved the Pakistan Medical and Dental Council (PM&DC). In 2022, the Islamabad High Court restored the PM&DC and declared the formation of Pakistan Medical Commission (PMC) – a body formed through a presidential ordinance in its place – as illegal.

== Registration ==
All medical and dental practitioners and students are required to register with the commission to legally practice medicine and dentistry in Pakistan. The guidelines for registration are outlined under Chapter IX, Pakistan Registration of Medical and Dental Practitioners Regulations, 2008.

== Criticism ==
Several corruption allegations and scandals have been associated with the previous council (PMC). In particular, irregularities in the registration of medical and dental colleges and allegations of wrongdoing in the accreditation of doctors have also been leveled in judicial probes of the council's affairs. A judicial commission was set up under a court order after allegations of embezzlement in the registration of private medical and dental colleges surfaced in 2013. The commission was headed by the former Lahore High Court judge Shabbar Raza Rizvi.

The disparity in the issuance of PMDC licenses raises significant concerns about fairness and transparency in the licensing process. The students completed my MS Orthopedics in 2024 from Khawaja Muhammad Safdar Medical College, Sialkot, a degree recognized and affiliated with the University of Health Sciences. Despite fulfilling all academic and training requirements, the students have yet to receive my permanent PMDC license. On the other hand, some of their colleagues (Yasir Iqbal PMDC no. 81910-P and Muneeb Ur Rehman Cheema PMDC # 69018-P), who also trained in the same institution and department, were granted their PMDC numbers in 2024 after completing their FCPS (not MS). This inconsistency appears to stem from the PMDC's lack of evaluation visits to the institution. It is unjustifiable that this oversight penalizes some graduates while favoring others, perpetuating a system of double standards. This agency did also unjust behaviour with the first Pakistani female orthopedic surgeon, even after completing her degree, the agency did not issue PMDC license. This will promote fairness, eliminate bias, and uphold the professional integrity of the medical fraternity.

The MS Orthopedics degree, awarded by the University of Health Sciences, has been fully attested by the Higher Education Commission (HEC), affirming its authenticity and validity. This attestation certifies that this qualification meets international standards and allows one to pursue a medical career worldwide, subject to fulfilling additional country-specific requirements. However, in their own country, Pakistan, the graduate are unable to practice as an MS Orthopedic Surgeon due to the lack of a PMDC license. This predicament stems not from any deficiency in the credentials but from systemic issues such as inadequate documentation, lack of oversight, or maladministration by PMDC or Khawaja Muhammad Safdar Medical College. It is unjust to penalize students for administrative shortcomings beyond their control.

Representatives of various medical organisations have expressed their concerns regarding PMC that it will give autonomy to private medical colleges for fixing their fees, thus increasing the burden on students.

== Dissolution and restoration ==
In October 2019, the PMDC was dissolved and replaced by the Pakistan Medical Commission (PMC) following President Arif Alvi's signing of the Pakistan Medical Commission Ordinance 2019. The move was done in order to regulate and control the medical profession in Pakistan by establishing uniform minimum standards of medical education, training, and recognition of qualifications in medicine and dentistry. For this to occur, it was argued that PMDC had to be dissolved first in order to properly implement the new ordinance. PMDC offices were temporarily sealed to ensure the protection of essential records and assets. The new PMC would consist of the existing Medical and Dental Council, the National Medical and Dental Academic Board, and the National Medical Authority, which would act as a Secretariat of the Commission.

On 11 February 2020, the Islamabad High Court nullified the Pakistan Medical Commission Ordinance and restored PMDC.

On 16 September 2020, PMDC was dissolved again by a joint session of the Senate and Parliament by passing the bill to replace PMDC with PMC to ensure standard medical education in Pakistan.

On 23 August 2022, The Senate Standing Committee on Health on Tuesday approved the Pakistan Medical and Dental Council Amendment Bill, 2022, with a majority vote, after which the legal status of the PMC has ceased to exist.

On 12 January 2023, The President of Pakistan gave final approval to the PMDC Bill 2022 after which the Pakistan Medical and Dental Council have been established.

== See also ==
- List of medical colleges in Pakistan
  - List of medical schools in Islamabad
  - List of medical schools in Punjab, Pakistan
  - List of medical schools in Sindh
  - List of medical schools in Balochistan
  - List of medical schools in Khyber Pakhtunkhwa
  - List of medical schools in Azad Kashmir
- College of Physicians and Surgeons Pakistan
