= PS-107 Karachi South-II =

Constituency of the Provincial Assembly of Sindh, Pakistan

- Constituency for the Provincial Assembly of Sindh
- Region: Agra Taj Colony, Bihar Colony, Football ground and Chakiwara neighborhoods of Lyari Town of Karachi South District in Karachi
- Electorate: 250,937

Current constituency
- Member: Vacant
- Created from: PS-108 Karachi-XX (2002-2018); PS-108 Karachi South-II (2018-2023)

PS-107 Karachi South-II (پی ایس-107، کراچی جنوبی-2) is a constituency of the Provincial Assembly of Sindh.

== General elections 2024 ==
Provincial election 2024: PS-107 Karachi South-II
Party	Candidate	Votes	%	±%
PPP	Muhammad Yousuf Baloch	26,902	37.71	
Independent	Khalid (Note: Filed nomination papers as PTI candidate but ECP allowed him to run as an Independent)	19,673	27.57	
JI	Mehmood Essa	13,820	19.37	
PML(N)	Tanveer Khan Jadoon	4,871	6.83	
TLP	Syed Ali Osama Qadr	3,513	4.92	
Others	Others (eighteen candidates)	2,569	3.60	
Turnout		72,953	29.07	
Total valid votes		71,348	97.80	
Rejected ballots		1,605	2.20	
Majority		7,229	10.14	
Registered electors		250,937		
PPP gain from PTI				

== General elections 2018 ==
Provincial election 2018: PS-108 Karachi South-II
Party	Candidate	Votes	%	±%
MMA	Syed Abdul Rasheed	16,821	21.78	
PTI	Abdul Nasir Baloch	15,579	20.17	
PPP	Abdul Majeed	12,252	15.86	
PML(N)	Sultan Bahadur Khan	11,113	14.39	
TLP	Muhammad Zafar Iqbal	7,958	10.30	
Independent	Shahid Ali	4,350	5.63	
Independent	Habib Hassan	3,242	4.20	
Independent	Jibran	1,291	1.67	
PSP	Muhammad Sadiq Rind	1,170	1.52	
ANP	Abdul Subhan	710	0.92	
Independent	Dost Muhammad Danish	702	0.91	
PRHP	Muhammad Mateen	512	0.66	
Independent	Peer Muhammad	472	0.61	
PPP(SB)	Akhter Hussain	435	0.56	
Pasban-e-Pakistan	Tanveer Ahmed	204	0.26	
Independent	Adnan	198	0.26	
Independent	Shah Jahan Baloch	101	0.13	
Independent	Syed Saleem Shah Gilani	74	0.10	
Independent	Atif Mehmood	43	0.06	
Majority		1,242	1.61	
Valid ballots		77,227		
Rejected ballots		1,968		
Turnout		79,195		
Registered electors		207,724		
hold				

== General elections 2013 ==
Contesting candidates	Party affiliation	Votes polled

== General elections 2008 ==
Contesting candidates	Party affiliation	Votes polled

== See also ==
- PS-106 Karachi South-I
- PS-108 Karachi South-III
