= Lyari Expressway =

Road in Karachi, Pakistan

Lyari Expressway لیاری بزرگرہ
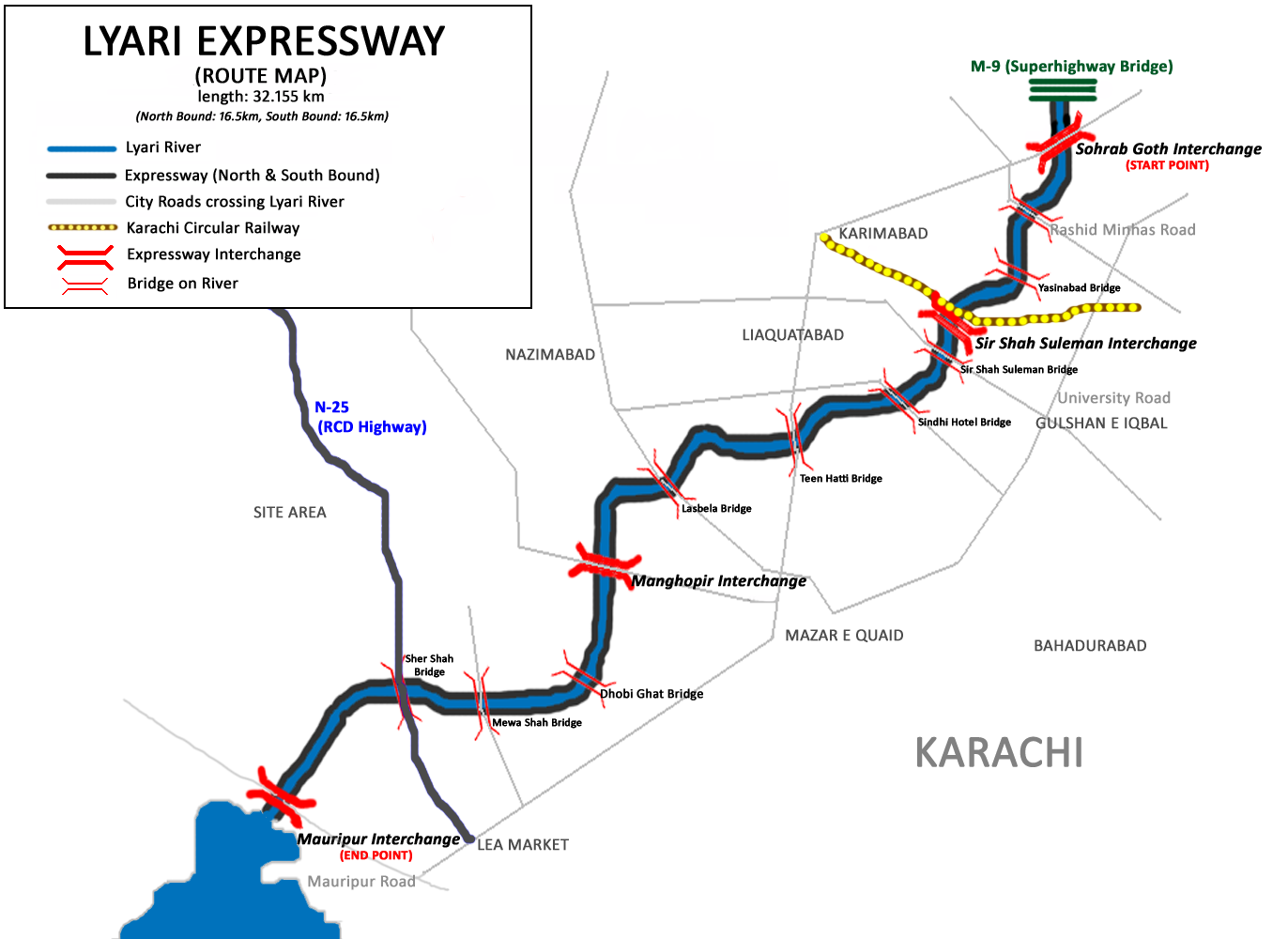

Route information
- Maintained by City District Government Karachi
- Length: 16.5 km (10.3 mi)
- Existed: 2018–present

Location
- Country: Pakistan

Highway system
- Roads in Pakistan

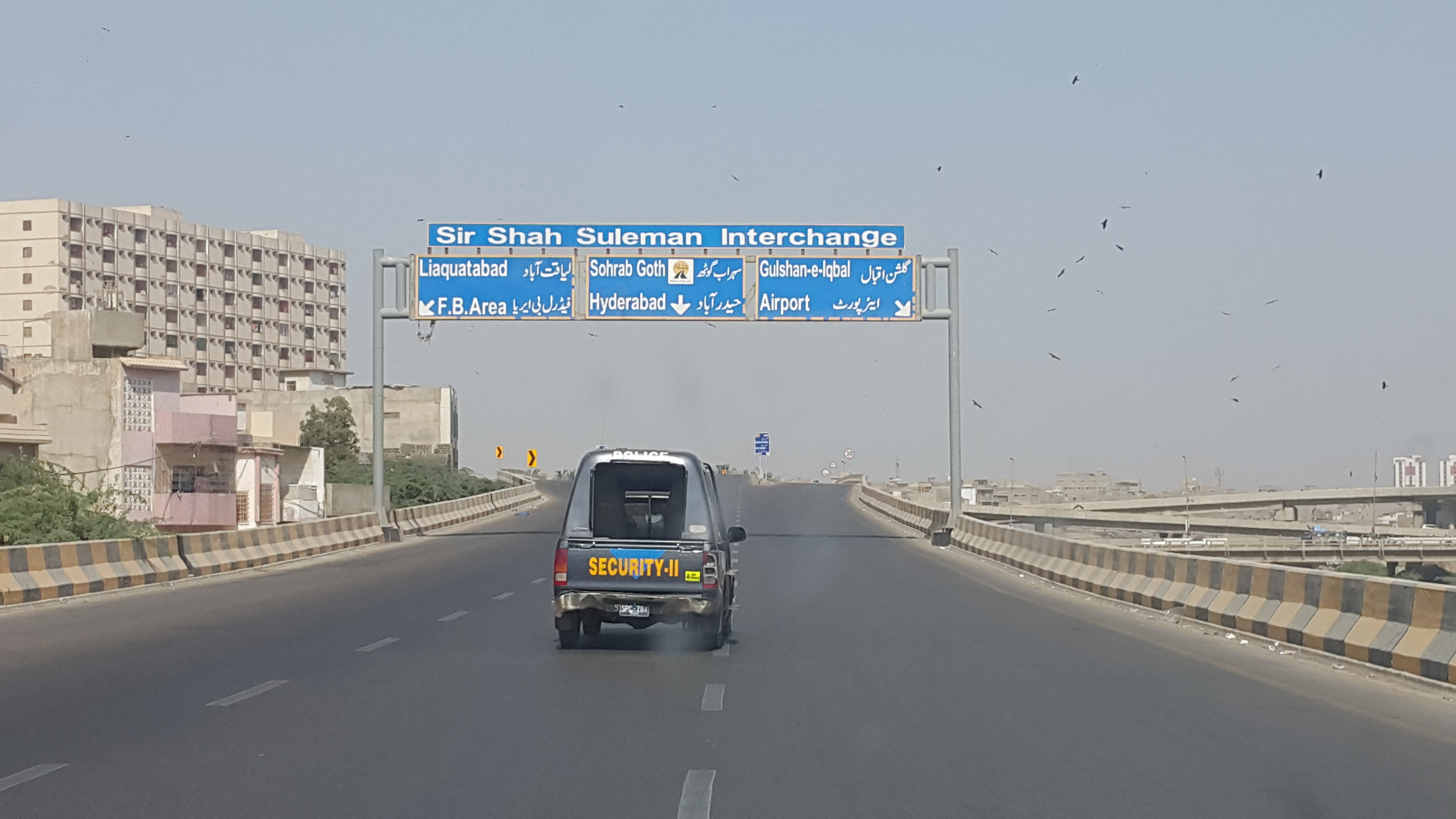
Sir Shah Suleman Interchange of Lyari Expressway

Lyari Expressway (Urdu: لیاری بزرگرہ) is a 16.5 kilometre (10.3 mi) city district expressway constructed along the Lyari River in Karachi, Sindh, Pakistan.

== History ==
The expressway was expected to be completed by August 2017, with a formal inauguration ceremony to be held on 14 August 2017.

The project had been delayed for more than 15 years due to the lack of federal funding and no interest shown by the Sindh provincial Government.

After the High Court deadline, Lyari Expressway completion date was finally announced. Prime Minister Shahid Khaqan Abbasi inaugurated the pending northbound track of expressway on 28 January 2018, which starts from Mauripur and end at Sohrab Goth Interchange.

== History ==
The Lyari Expressway project was launched on 11 May 2002, with the aim of serving as a commuting artery connecting Mauripur Road and the M9 motorway, thus alleviating the burden of traffic plying on surface routes between to and from Karachi Port. When work started on the Lyari Expressway in May 2002, the National Highway Authority (NHA) had expected to complete it in 30 months (i.e. by November 2004). Having revised the completion schedule, as of December 2006 the Frontier Works Organisation (FWO), the executing agency for the NHA, expects the southbound section running from Sohrab Goth to Mauripur Road completed by the end of 2007. The construction of Lyari Expressway was stopped for several years due to the restructuring of Municipal governments in Sindh and lack of funds. In July 2014, Government of Pakistan announced Rs 6 billion for completion of Lyari Expressway. Lyari Expressway Project is 32 kilometres long and its 2013-14 revised estimate is Rs 1,202 million and 80 percent of this project has also been completed.

This section is copied as-is from an article in the Dawn newspaper.

"The Lyari Expressway was nowhere in the picture until 1986. The Karachi Master Plan 1975–85 had proposed the Northern and Southern Bypasses to enable traffic going upcountry from Karachi port to bypass the city and thus ease congestion and pollution. The Southern Bypass was designed to go through the Defence Authority area and link Karachi port with the National Highway. It had to be dropped because of stiff resistance from the DHA on environmental grounds. The Northern Bypass that could have been easily constructed then was not built on account of the apathy of the policy makers.

Public attention was focussed on the Lyari, which wrecked (sic) destruction in 1977 when heavy rains caused severe flooding to 200 deaths. Wapda did come up with a flood protection plan but this was never implemented. In 1986, the Lyari Expressway was proposed as an alternative to the Northern Bypass, but was found unfeasible since 100,000 people would have to be evicted. The floods in 1993 led to the revival of the plan for the expressway as a device for flood protection apart from its function of providing another traffic corridor. Opposition from civil society led the Sindh government to arrange public hearings on the project in 1996 after which the Lyari Expressway was dropped and attention was focussed on the Northern Bypass for port traffic. This was found feasible as most of the land on which it was to be built was uninhabited. Four years later in 2000 the Karachi Port Trust decided to begin work on the Bypass on a BOT basis. It was to be a six-lane highway 68 km in length that would connect Mauripur to the Super Highway beyond the toll plaza at Sohrab Goth.

In June 2001 there was a change of heart and the government came up with the idea of building both the Northern Bypass and the Lyari Expressway together in the budget for the bypass alone. This two-in-one approach appealed to the highest quarters though it is not known how this feat was to be achieved by those masterminding it. The work was entrusted to the National Highway Authority and the FWO (Frontier Works Organization) was appointed contractor for LEP (Lyari Expressway Project), and the NLC for the bypass. The alignment of the bypass was changed to make it shorter and its lanes were reduced to four to cut the cost."

== Displacement and resettlement ==
The construction of the Lyari Expressway required the demolition of 15,000 housing units and the displacement of 24,400 families living along the Lyari River. This is thought to be the largest urban demolition project for the purpose of road-making in the world. To resettle the displaced people, the government launched the Lyari Expressway Resettlement Project. As part of this project, the people were given a compensation package that included an 80 square yard plot of land on the outskirts of Karachi and Rs 50,000 for construction. The lands were allotted in newly developed suburbs in Hawke's Bay, Taiser Town and Baldia Town.

The demolished settlements along the Lyari River in most cases did not have all the utilities and were not planned constructions. The new suburbs at Hawke's Bay, Taiser Town and Baldia Town however have been planned with utilities, transport, schools, parks and roads.. An assessment made in a Dawn newspaper article describes the new sites as follows.

"The exercise has offered a mixed bag to the people affected. The sites developed in Taiser Town, Hawke's Bay and Baldia are neat, clean and offer the advantage of an open environment. It is said that when the Hawke's Bay site for the Lyari affectees was launched in 2002 the displaced people were virtually dumped in the open with no water, electricity or gas. There were no regular bus services connecting it with the city.

But visits last month present a different picture. Taiser Town and the Hawke's Bay sites appear well developed. They had electricity connection, sewage lines had been laid and homes had started receiving gas connections. The plantation — of course not enough to make the entire area lush green— was substantial by Karachi standards.

Another positive aspect of life in the resettlement sites for those who are fortunate to get it is education. However it has not been easy sailing for everyone. There are not enough schools (and only one at the secondary level) though the Citizens Foundation (TCF) schools and others are being upgraded gradually. This means that the older children have suffered, and many of them have given up their education".

== Controversy ==
The neighborhoods along the Lyari River had developed over several decades, with some people having lived there since the independence of Pakistan. As such, their forced removal and the demolition of their homes has resulted in widespread opposition and generated controversy. There has been pressure from groups within the country as well as foreign non-governmental agencies to halt construction or provide a better compensation package for the displaced people. Despite these controversies, resettlement has gone ahead and construction has continued.

The controversy was the subject of a 2002 short documentary film titled "The People vs. Lyari Expressway". The film was written and directed by Maheen Zia and was screened at the Kara Film Festival in Karachi.

== See also ==
- Lyari
- Lyari Development Authority
- Lyari River
- Lyari Town
- Lyari Expressway Resettlement Project
- Hawke's Bay Beach
- Taiser Town
- M9 motorway (Pakistan)
- Karachi Northern Bypass (M10 motorway)
- Transport in Karachi
