= Singo Lane =

Residential neighborhood locality in Karachi, Pakistan

Singo Lane سنگو لین
- Neighbourhood
- Country: Pakistan
- City: Karachi
- District: Karachi South
- Time zone: UTC+5 (PST)
- Postal code: 75300

Singo Lane (Urdu: سنگو لین) is a residential neighbourhood in Lyari, located in the Karachi South district of Karachi, Pakistan.

There are several ethnic groups in Singo Lane including Muhajirs, Sindhis, Punjabis, Kashmiris, Seraikis, Pakhtuns, Balochs, Memons, Bohras, Ismailis, etc. Over 99% of the population is Muslim. The population of Lyari Town is estimated to be over 600,000 in 2005.
