= Ragiwara =

Residential neighborhood in Karachi, Pakistan

Ragiwara راگیواڑہ
- Neighbourhood
- Country: Pakistan
- City: Karachi
- District: Karachi South
- Time zone: UTC+5 (PST)
- Postal code: 75300

Ragiwara (Urdu: راگیواڑہ) is a residential neighbourhood in Lyari, located in the Karachi South district of Karachi, Pakistan.

There are several ethnic groups in Rangiwara including Sindhis, Punjabis, Kashmiris, Pakhtuns, Baloch, Makrani People (Majority of Punjguri) Makrani), Hazarewal, Dawoodi Bohras. Over 97% of the population is Muslim and 3% Hindu community. The population of Lyari Town is estimated to be over 600,000 in 2005.
