= Miriam Chandy Menacherry =

Indian documentary filmmaker (born 1975)

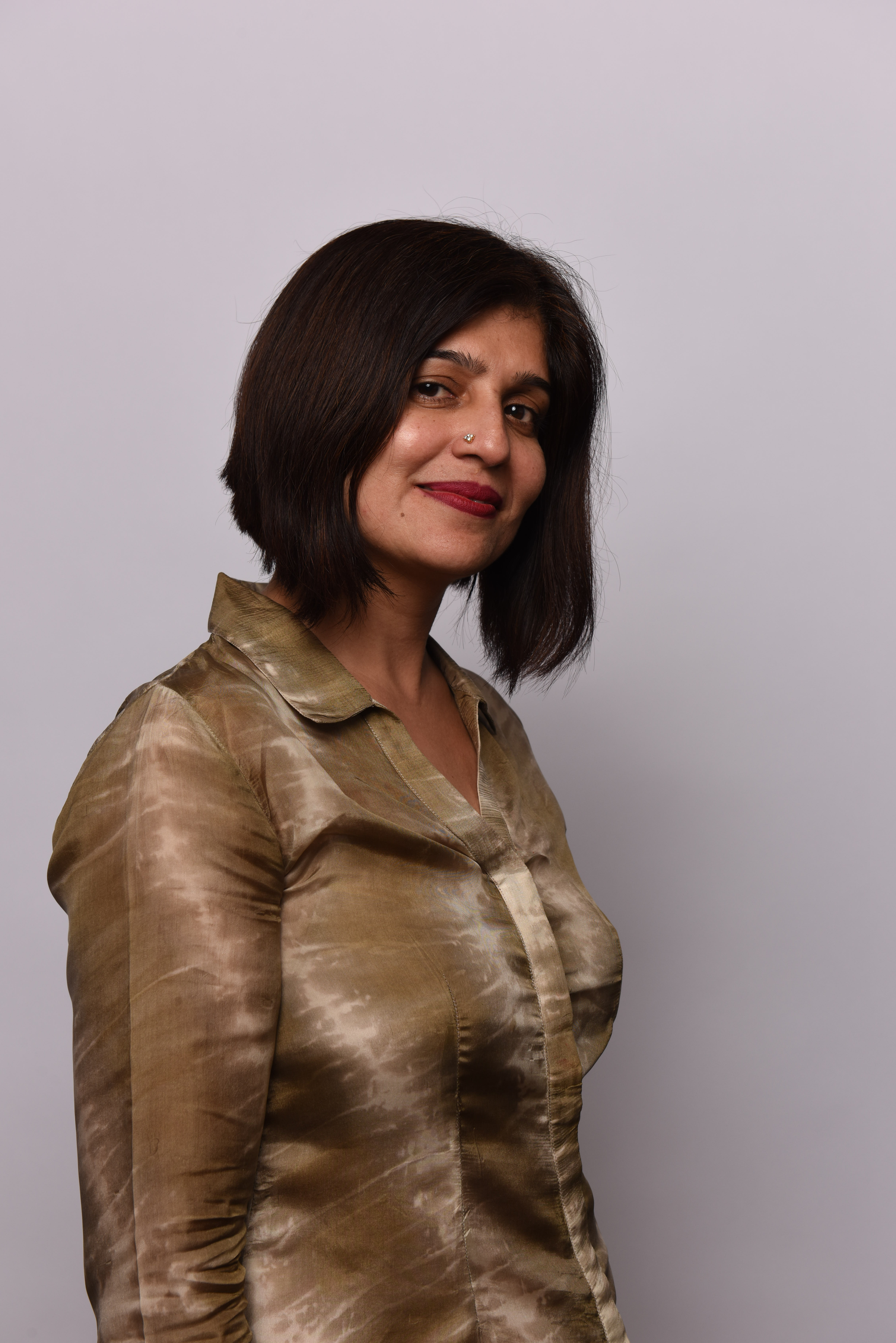
- Born: 9 March 1975 (age 51); Chennai, India
- Education: A. J. K. Mass Communication Research Centre
- Occupations: Documentary director and producer
- Years active: 2004–present
- Spouse: Dr. Paul Vincent Menacherry
- Children: 1
- Parents: Chandy Mathew Pallivathukkal (father); Annie Chandy Mathew (mother)

Miriam Chandy Menacherry (born 9 March 1975) is an Indian documentary filmmaker based in Mumbai, India. She won the National Film Award for Best Direction non-feature film for From the Shadows (2022).

She founded Filament Pictures in 2005, a production house which creates socially relevant feature-length documentaries. She was one of the 18 filmmakers selected from the Middle East and Asia for the Global Media Makers Fellowship 2019-20 offered by the US State Department and Film Independent. Her documentary, Rat Race (2011) was the winner of the Mipdoc Co-Production Challenge at Cannes (France). Miriam has also won the Asian Television Awards for Best Social Documentary (2007) and the UK Environment Film Fellowship (2008).

== Early life and education ==
Menacherry was born in Chennai. She did her schooling at Bangalore. She graduated from Stella Maris College, Chennai with a B.Sc (Honors). She has a post-graduate degree in Film and Television from the A. J. K. Mass Communication Research Centre, New Delhi.

After schooling she was a correspondent for CNBC, India and then moved on to UTV as a director. Filament Pictures was established in 2005 to make meaningful cinema catering to a worldwide audience.

Menacherry directs and produces her films, and occasionally forays into scriptwriting and distribution. Of Malayali lineage, Menacherry is working on the Women in Cinema Collective (WCC) and their efforts to bring in change in Malayalam cinema.

== Documentaries ==
Back to the Floor (2004) was a series directed by Menacherry for the BBC World. This was the Indian edition of the British series by the same name Back to the Floor. The Indian edition featured top management from the leading business houses in India working at the shop level to gain a different perspective on the challenges faced by their employees. It won the India Television Awards for Best Business Series.

The Stuntmen of Bollywood (2005) was produced for the National Geographic Channel. The documentary features the lives and hardships faced by the stunt doubles in Bollywood. It was nominated for 'most innovative’ film at the Asian Television Awards.

Mee Koli (2005) is a documentary about the Koli fishermen of Mumbai, the original settlers of the city and their fight to preserve the delicate web of marine life that sustains their livelihood.

A documentary that verges on the border of science fiction, Robot Jockey (2007) explores the juncture in the life of the Bedouin camel racers in Qatar when they had to train their camels to accept metallic riders. On facing international backlash for using child jockeys in camel racing, Qatar decided to silence the criticism by switching to robot jockeys. Robot Jockey won the Asian Television Awards for Best Social Documentary in 2008.

Meeting the energy needs of a community without resorting to vandalizing nature – A Light Burns (2008) is about the difficulties faced by a remote community in Jharkhand to bring electricity to their village. The film follows the journey of the community to produce biodiesel from locally available oil seeds. It won the UK Environment Film Fellowship.

The Rat Race (2011) documents the lives of the rat-killers in Mumbai who work whilst the city sleeps. The central node of the story is an aspiring Bollywood dancer who turns to rat-catching for various reasons and spends the next 37 years killing rats and supervising other rat-catchers. This documentary was the winner of the Mipdoc Co-Production Challenge, Cannes (France), Audience Awards, Florence (Italy) and Kerala (India). The documentary also premiered at IDFA, Amsterdam (Netherlands).

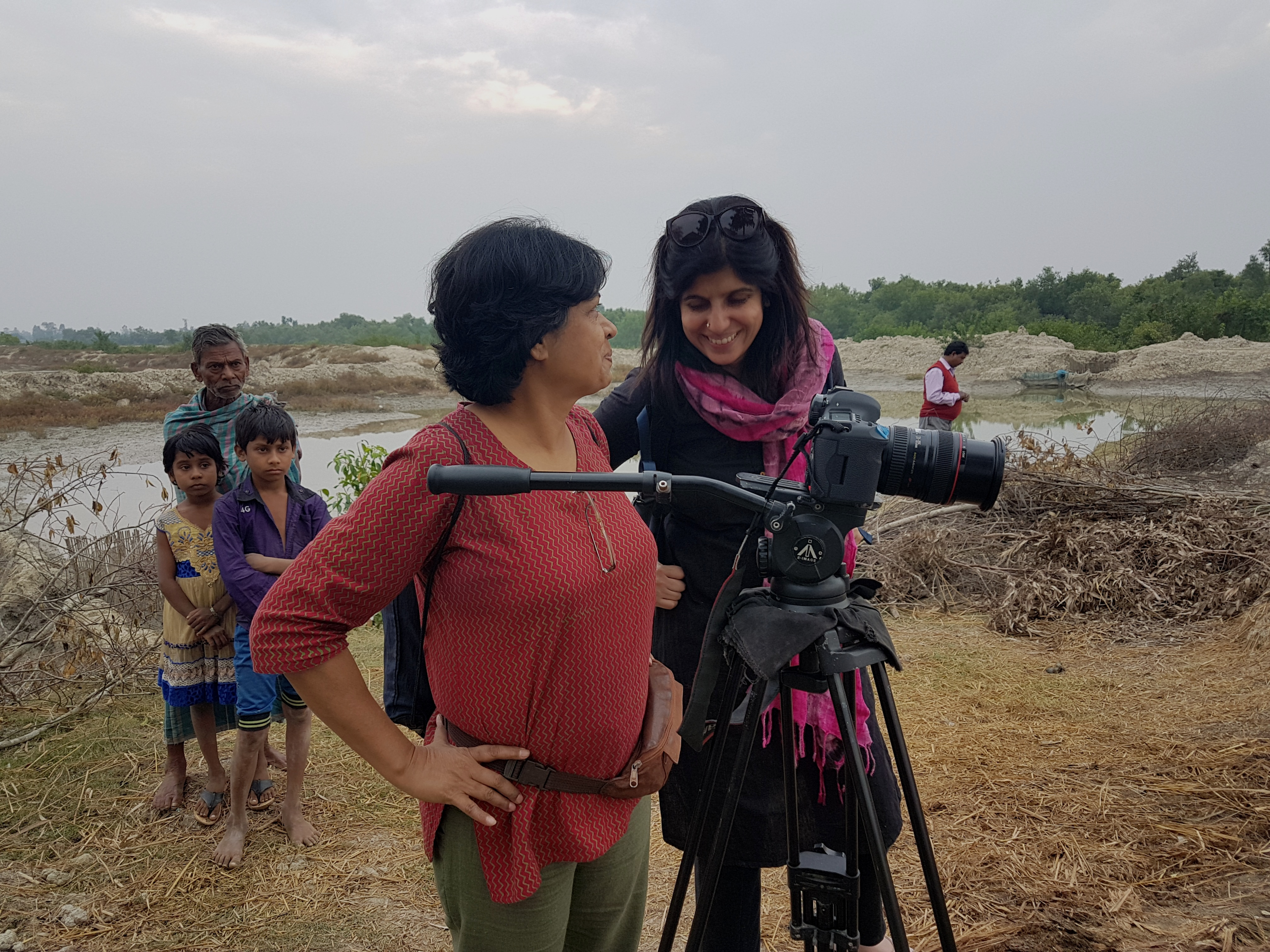
From the sets of From the Shadows

Lyari Notes (2015), co-directed by Maheen Zia, is a coming-of-age story of four young girls in Karachi. Living in Lyari, an area known for gang warfare, they make the decision to choose music over violence. Zia and Menacherry, two filmmakers from India and Pakistan respectively, come together to produce a political discourse through the media of music and film. The documentary was the winner of the IDPA Long form Documentary Award (Silver). It was nominated by the Alliance of Women Film Journalists for the EDA Award at IDFA (Netherlands), and the youth jury award at Sheffield (UK). Lyari Notes was the opening film at the Artists cinema package at the Kochi Biennale (India), and the Indie Meme International Festival in Austin, Texas (USA).

From the Shadows (2022) was selected for the Lisbon Docs Pitch (Portugal), Docedge (India), Global Media Makers Program (USA), Docs Port Incheon (Korea), Global Pitch Sunny Side of the Docs (France), Good Pitch (India), and Impact Day FIFDH (Geneva). This feature-length documentary film portrays the survivors of child sex trafficking in India. It had its premiere at the International Documentary and Short Film Festival of Kerala. Both From the Shadows and Lyari Notes were funded partly through crowdsourcing.

== Filmography ==
- 2004 – Back to the Floor for BBC World (Director)
- 2005 – Stuntmen of Bollywood for National Geographic Channel (Director)
- 2005 – Mee Koli (Director)
- 2007 – Robot Jockey for National Geographic Channel (Director/Producer)
- 2008 – A Light Burns for Discovery Channel and Doordarshan (Director)
- 2011 – The Rat Race (Director/Producer)
- 2015 – Lyari Notes (Co-Director/Co-Producer)
- 2022 – From the Shadows (Director/Producer)
