= Hawke's Bay (disambiguation) =

Hawke's Bay primarily refers to a region on the east coast of New Zealand's North Island.

Hawke's Bay may refer to:

== Geographic locations ==
=== Canada ===
- Hawke's Bay, Newfoundland and Labrador, Canada

=== New Zealand ===
- Hawke Bay, a bay on the east coast of North Island
- Hawkes Bay (New Zealand electorate), an electorate (1881–1996) until 1986 spelled Hawke's Bay
- Hawke's Bay Province, a province of New Zealand until 1876

=== Pakistan ===
Often spelled as Hawkesbay in Pakistan.

- a bay on the Arabian Sea, west of Karachi, south of Kiamari Town
- Hawke's Bay Beach
- Hawke's Bay Town, Karachi, Sindh, Pakistan

== Others ==
- Hawke's Bay cricket team
- Hawke's Bay Guineas
- Hawke's Bay Hawks
- Hawke's Bay Rugby Union
- Hawke's Bay Today
- Hawke's Bay Unicorns
- Hawke's Bay United
