= Hawke's Bay Town =

Town in Sindh, Pakistan

Coordinates: 24.895152°N 66.844339°E

Hawke's Bay Town (Urdu: ہاکس بے) is a small town located in the larger Keamari Town in Karachi, Sindh, Pakistan.

Hawke's Bay Town was notified in July 1984 by Karachi Development Authority. It was a residential scheme for low- and middle-income group.

== Town development history ==
During Pervez Musharraf's regime in 2002, Hawke's Bay Town was also being developed as a neighbourhood to settle over 250,000 people displaced by the construction of Lyari Expressway. However the entire Hawke's Bay Housing Scheme No. 42 was not for the settlement of population displaced from Lyari Expressway. Hawke's Bay Housing Scheme No. 42 had been divided into 71 districts, generally known as blocks or sectors. A few of Sectors/Blocks (Sector 6, 9, and 10) had been allotted to the displaced people of Lyari Expressway, and other sectors/blocks had been allotted to citizens of Pakistan through public ballots, and a few sectors to journalists and government employees.

== See also ==
- Hawke's Bay Beach
- Lyari Development Authority
- Lyari Town
- Lyari Expressway Resettlement Project
