= Lyari Notes =

- Directed by: Maheen Zia; Miriam Chandy Menacherry
- Screenplay by: Miriam Chandy Menacherry
- Produced by: Iikka Vehkalahti
- Cinematography: Maheen Zia
- Edited by: Monisha Baldawa; Sankalp Meshram
- Music by: Hamza Jafri
- Production company: Filament Pictures
- Release date: 2016

Lyari Notes is a 2016 documentary that was directed by Maheen Zia and Miriam Chandy Menacherry. The film premiered at the International Documentary Film Festival Amsterdam after being pitched at the Sheffield Doc/Fest MeetMarket in 2015, and follows a young girl and her friends as they use music as a form of escape and expression.

== Synopsis ==
The film follows four young girls that routinely travel from Lyari to a musical school in another area. The travel is long and dangerous, plus the girls' families are not always supportive of their desire to learn music as they feel that it violates Islamic law. Lyari Notes follows the girls over a three-year period.

== Production ==
Chandy came up with the idea for the documentary after listening to music created by "young, underground Pakistani musicians" and thinking that it could make a good basis for a film. Zia was brought into the film as Chandy felt that "Having a filmmaker based in Karachi to capture every development as it happened, and also providing an insider's perspective, was critical to the film's nuanced narrative". The two had worked together on a prior project of Chandy's and together set on filming the documentary. While filming the two faced difficulties due to the fact that they were filming in both India and Pakistan, two nations not on friendly terms with one another. They also experienced issues with funding, which was alleviated via a successful crowdsourcing campaign.

Zia served as Lyari Notes's film director and initially Chandy intended to travel with Zia to Pakistan to film the young girls, but found that this could pose a danger to both Zia and their documentary subjects, as she is Indian. She instead chose to remain in India and worked on the documentary's post production work, a move that she felt made her more objective.
