= Lerp =

Lerp or LERP may refer to:

- Lerp (biology), a structure produced by larvae of psyllid insects as a protective cover
- Linear interpolation, a method of curve fitting in mathematics
- Emil Lerp (1886–1966), German inventor of first gasoline transportable chainsaw
- Liberia Equal Rights Party
- Lyari Expressway Resettlement Project
