= Baghdadi, Karachi =

Neighbourhood locality in the city of Karachi, Pakistan

Baghdadi بغدادی
- Neighbourhood
- Interactive map of Baghdadi
- Coordinates: 24.8618°N 66.9966°E
- Country: Pakistan
- Province: Sindh
- City: Karachi
- Town: Lyari

Baghdadi (Urdu: بغدادی) is a residential neighbourhood in Lyari, located in the Karachi South district of Karachi, Pakistan.
