= Daryaabad =

Daryaabad دریا آباد
- Neighbourhood
- Country: Pakistan
- City: Karachi
- District: Karachi South
- Time zone: UTC+5 (PST)
- Postal code: 75300

Daryaabad (Urdu: دریا آباد) is a neighbourhood in Lyari, located in the Karachi South district of Karachi, Pakistan.

There are several ethnic groups in Lyari Town including Muhajirs, Punjabis, Sindhis, Kashmiris, Seraikis, Pakhtuns, Balochis, Memons, Bohras Ismailis, etc. Over 99% of the population is Muslim. The population of Daryaabad is estimated to be nearly one million.

The Kachhi Muslim community is also a large number of residents of Daryaabad, including the leading Kachhi Hingora Jamaat, Kachhi Mandra Jamaat, Kachhi Soomro Jamaat and Kachhi Sanghar Jamaat.

Apart from this, other community groups are also settled here, including Rahman Sero Langa Gherai Mianji Jamaat.
