= Sango Lane =

Neighbourhood of Lyari Town in Karachi, Sindh, Pakistan

Coordinates: 32°20′N 71°55′E

Sango Lane (Urdu: سنگو لین) is one of the neighbourhoods of Lyari Town in Karachi, Sindh, Pakistan.

There are several ethnic groups in Sango Lane including Muhajirs, Sindhis, Kashmiris, Seraikis, Pakhtuns, Balochis, Memons, Bohras, Ismailis, etc. Over 99% of the population is Muslim. The population of Lyari Town is estimated to be nearly one million.
