= Muslim Teli =

Muslim descendants of Teli

Teli Musalmaan
Regions with significant populations
- India • Pakistan • Nepal

Languages
- Urdu • Sindhi • Marwari • Punjabi

Religion
- Islam 100%

Related ethnic groups
- Teli; Baniya; Ghanchi; Shaikh; Khokhar; Ghilji

The Muslim Teli are members of the Teli caste who follow Sunni Islam. They are found in India, Pakistan and Nepal. Their surname is Malik.

Related to the Muslim Teli are the Ghanchi, a community found in Gujarat, who are also involved in the manufacture and trade of cooking oil.

They have Other Backward Class status in Bihar.

== Notables ==
- Irfan Solanki, Ex MLA from Sishamau, Kanpur Nagar (UP)
