= Lyari River =

Coordinates: 24°52′N 66°58′E

Lyari
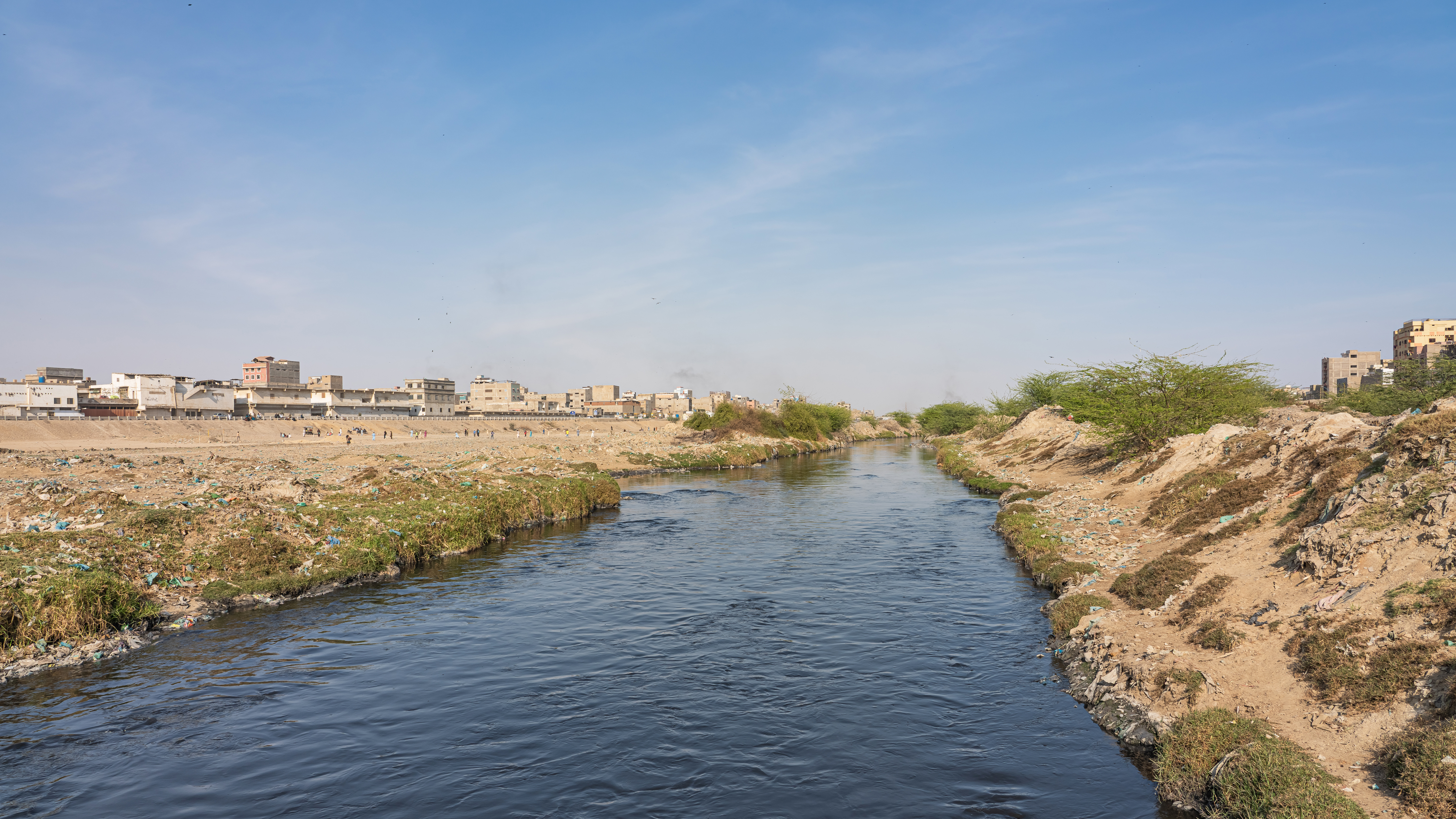

Location
- Country: Pakistan
- State: Sindh
- City: Karachi

Physical characteristics
- Source: Rain catchment area
  - location: Sindh
- Mouth
  - location: Karachi
  - elevation: 0 m (0 ft)
- Length: 50 km (31 mi)approx.
- Discharge
  - location: Arabian Seaapprox.

Lyari River (Urdu: دریائے لیاری) is a small ephemeral stream that flows through the Pakistani megacity of Karachi from north east to the center and drains into the Arabian Sea at the Manora channel. It is one of the two drainage conduit's of Karachi, the other being the Malir River. The river is about 50 kilometres (31 mi) long. As a seasonal river, it carries the collected water after the rains in the catchment area.

== History ==
After the arrival of the British in 1839 and the development of Karachi, the river was the natural border of the initial settlement. The river was described as maintaining a waterflow merely for approximately five days annually, remaining desiccated for the remaining 360 days, resembling nothing more than a sandy expanse.

Until the 1970s, the river held clean water and fish, with farming activities on its banks. However, after the independence of Pakistan from British colonialism in 1947, when Karachi was announced as the capital city of the new country, a large influx of refugees from various Indian states as well as from other provinces of Pakistan settled in the city. With the rapid growth of the city's economy, industry, and population, the river's ecology was transformed and it gradually became a waterway where discharged wastewater, sewage and industrial effluents ended up.

== Redevelopments along the river ==
With many squatter settlements groomed in the river's surroundings, the occasional floods started causing human and property loss. Especially, after the havoc caused by the torrential rains in 1977, the need was realised to build flood barriers along the river. In 1986, a proposal was made to build an expressway through the city that would run along the riverbanks of Lyari. The plan was abandoned because an estimated 100,000 people would have to be relocated. However, the flooding and associated losses continued in the 1990s.

=== Lyari Expressway ===
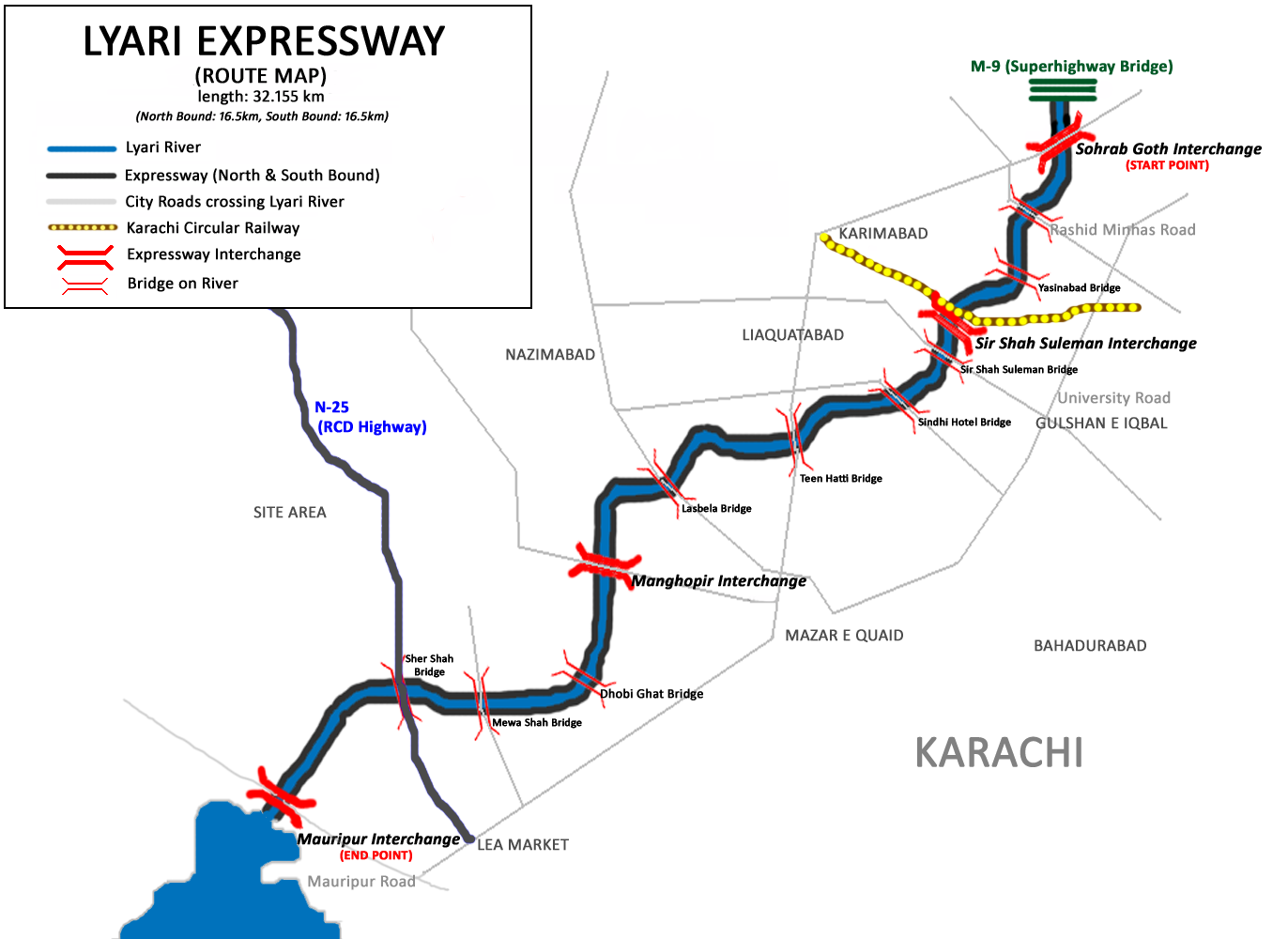
Lyari Expressway - Route Map

The project comprises a 16.5 kilometre (10¼ mile) stretch of elevated expressway running along both sides of the river, cutting through the city to Karachi Port, as an extension/alternative to the Northern Bypass. The work commenced in 2002 without any public consensus, as a result of which large numbers of houses and schools were demolished on account of being informal settlements.

The measures were strongly opposed by the affected population, community groups, civil society organizations and NGOs on the grounds that at least 200,000 families would have to be displaced from the development sites in addition to the economic and environmental costs. A number of cost-effective alternatives were also proposed by local activists and organizations. However, the project continued with the additions of the Lyari Expressway Resettlement Project as a relocation plan to move the affected families to the purpose-built areas in Hawk's Bay and Taiser Town, in the city's suburbs.

=== Other developments and extensions ===
Apart from the eviction and resettlement of Lyari Expressway, redevelopment plans have also been carried out under the Lyari River Development Scheme in other towns along the river such as Gulberg, North Nazimabad, Saddar, Jamshed, Gulshan-e-Iqbal and Liaquatabad.

== Pollution ==
The river is the main contributor to an estimated amount of 909 million litres of raw sewage that enters the Arabian Sea. The only non-saline input is the local run-off from rainfall. A large number of industries including leather tanning units, pharmaceuticals, petrochemicals, refineries, chemical, textile, paper and pulp, engineering works and thermal power stations, located along the river, regularly discharge their untreated industrial waste.

With the growing amount of organic nutrients in the river water, the marine ecology along the coastal shelf has been alarmingly affected. The spillage due to tidal action also continues to affect the mangroves along the Karachi Port. The pollutants along with other environmental perturbations have also proved to be harmful to the biodiversity of marine species along Karachi Fish Harbour including green turtle, seabirds and marine mammals.

== See also ==
- Green turtle
- Lyari
- Lyari Town
- Lyari Development Authority
- Lyari Expressway Resettlement Project
- Lyari Expressway
- Malir River
- Gujjar Nala
- Karachi
