= Nisha Rao =

Pakistani lawyer and activist

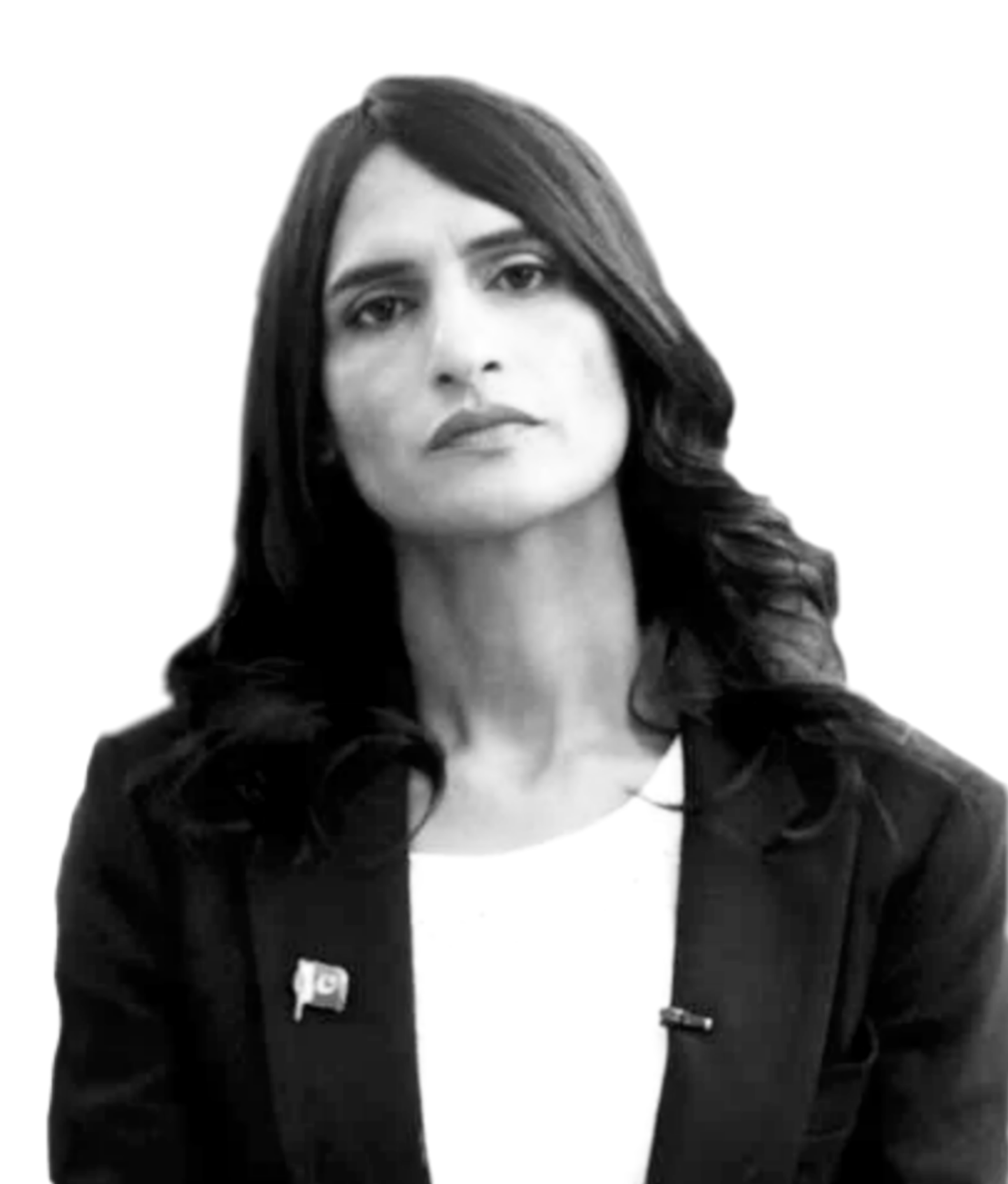
- Born: Lahore, Pakistan
- Education: Law, LL.B
- Alma mater: University of Karachi
- Occupations: Advocate, Lawyer
- Website: https://www.nisharao.com

Nisha Rao is a Pakistani transgender lawyer, advocate and activist. In 2020, she became the first transgender law graduate in Pakistan.

== Personal life ==
Rao was born in a middle-class family from Lahore, in the Punjab region, and had seven siblings. During her early years, she was enrolled at a private English medium school in Lahore. At age 14, Nisha realized she was different. She was never beaten by her parents for her feminine habits but she chose to leave her house after completing matric. She moved to Karachi for a fresh start.

In Karachi, she began living with a transgender community in the Hijrat colony. Rao begged on the streets for a time to fund her expenditures. Throughout this time Rao told her family she was being financed independently for school in Karachi but was begging in the streets. She would beg from 8am to 3pm and take law classes from 4 to 9 pm. She earned her bachelor's degree at Karachi University.

== Education ==
Rao is one of the few transgender people in Pakistan who chose to pursue higher education. After completing college, she enrolled in a BA program at Karachi University to specialize in International Relations. During this time, she befriended an advocate named 'Mudassir Iqbal', who, according to Rao, supported her in pursuing higher education. Nisha then decided to pursue higher studies and was admitted to Sindh Muslim Law College in 2015. The college's former principal, Mustafa Ali Mahesar, supported Nisha in her studies and also gave her private coaching in International Law. Rao graduated in 2018.

== Career ==
Rao began her law career by participating in various advocacy events. She later associated herself with various Non-governmental organizations (NGOs) as a volunteer and a legal adviser. She joined the Gender Interactive Alliance (GIA), which works for the rights of the transgender community. She moved to Islamabad after she was appointed as treasurer, but she soon had to leave her job due to financial hurdles.

Nisha also tutored many children in her area to supplement her income.

As a lawyer, Nisha has dealt with over 50 cases regarding the transgender community.

== Future plans ==
Nisha plans to help the transgender community through her NGO. She wants to set up a helpline where transgender people can be guided by other community members. She also has plans to build a transgender old age home in the near future.
