= List of medical schools in Karachi =

In Pakistan, a medical school is more often referred to as a medical college. A medical college is affiliated with a university as a department which usually has a separate campus. The medical schools in Karachi are both private and public.

== List of medical colleges ==
| No. | Name of medical school | Funding | Established | Enrollment | University | District | Province | Website | IMED profile |
|---|---|---|---|---|---|---|---|---|---|
| 1 | Karachi Medical and Dental College | Public | 1991 | 250 | UoK | Karachi | Sindh | http://www.kmdc.edu.pk | 704160 |
| 2 | Ziauddin Medical College | Private | 1996 | 150 | ZMU | Karachi | Sindh | http://zmc.zu.edu.pk/index.php zu.edu.pk | 704045 |
| 3 | Aga Khan University | Private | 1983 | 100 | AKU | Karachi | Sindh | http://www.aku.edu | 704155 |
| 4 | Al-Tibri Medical College | Private | 2010 | 100 | IU-H | Karachi | Sindh | http://www.isra.edu.pk ] | 704290 |
| 5 | United Medical and Dental College | Private | 2013 | 100 | JSMU | Karachi | Sindh | http://www.umdc.edu.pk | 704035 |
| 6 | Baqai Medical University | Private | 1988 | 100 | BMU | Karachi | Sindh | http://www.baqai.edu.pk | 704122 |
| 7 | Dow International Medical College | Public | 2007 | 150 | DUHS | Karachi | Sindh | http://www.duhs.edu.pk | 704200 |
| 8 | Dow Medical College | Public | 1945 | 350 | DUHS | Karachi | Sindh | http://www.duhs.edu.pk | 704200 |
| 9 | Hamdard College of Medicine & Dentistry | Private | 1994 | 100 | HU-K | Karachi | Sindh | http://www.hamdard.edu.pk | 704115 |
| 10 | Jinnah Medical & Dental College | Private | 1998 | 100 | JSMU | Karachi | Sindh | http://www.jmc.edu.pk | 704035 |
| 11 | Liaquat College of Medicine and Dentistry | Private | 2006 | 100 | JSMU | Karachi | Sindh | http://www.lcmd.edu.pk | 704260 |
| 12 | Liaquat National Medical College | Private | 2007 | 100 | JSMU | Karachi | Sindh | http://www.lnh.edu.pk | 704245 |
| 13 | Shaheed Mohtarma Benazir Bhutto Medical College | Public | 2011 | 100 | DUHS | Karachi | Sindh | https://web.archive.org/web/20150509014905/http://www.sbbmcl.com.pk/ | 704425 |
| 14 | Sindh Medical College | Public | 1973 | 350 | JSMU | Karachi | Sindh | http://www.jsmu.edu.pk | 704065 |
| 15 | Sir Syed College of Medical Sciences | Private | 1998 | 100 | JSMU | Karachi | Sindh | http://www.sscms.edu.pk | 704045 |
| 16 | Bahria University Medical and Dental College | Private | 2008 | 100 | BU-I | Karachi | Sindh | http://www.bahria.edu.pk | 704325 |
| 17 | Muhammad Bin Qasim Medical and Dental College | private. | 2012 | 50. | | | | | |

== Karachi University ==
University of Karachi announced in September 2014 that it will establish its own medical college and a 100-bed hospital. The admission in the college for 100 students will be started in November 2014.

== See also ==
- Medical school
- List of medical schools
- Pakistan Medical and Dental Council
- List of medical schools in Sindh
- United Medical and Dental College
