= Saddar Town =

Residential town within the city of Karachi, Pakistan

Coordinates: 24°51′27″N 67°00′10″E

Saddar Town صدر ٹاؤن
- Constituent Town of Karachi
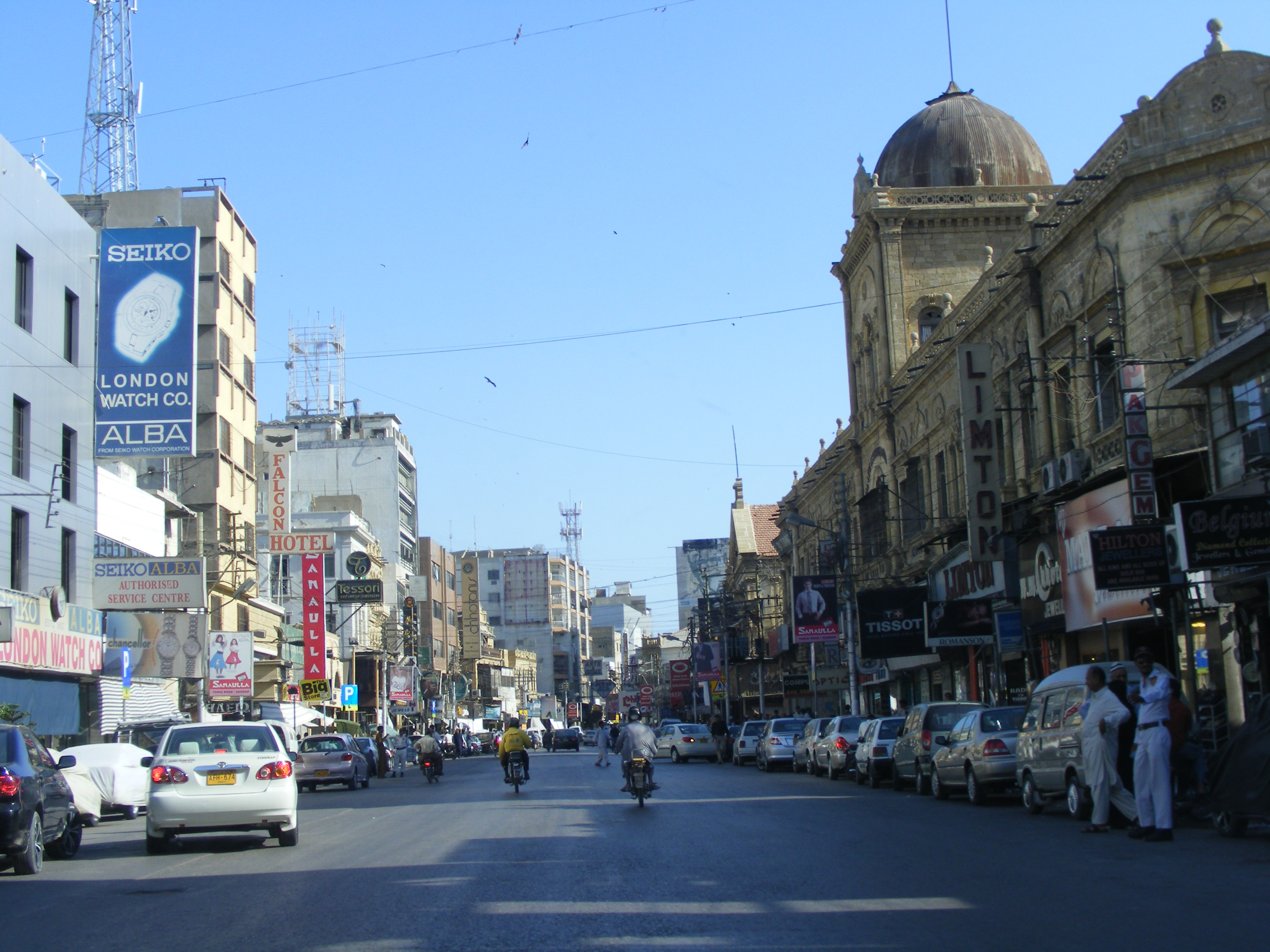
- Saddar

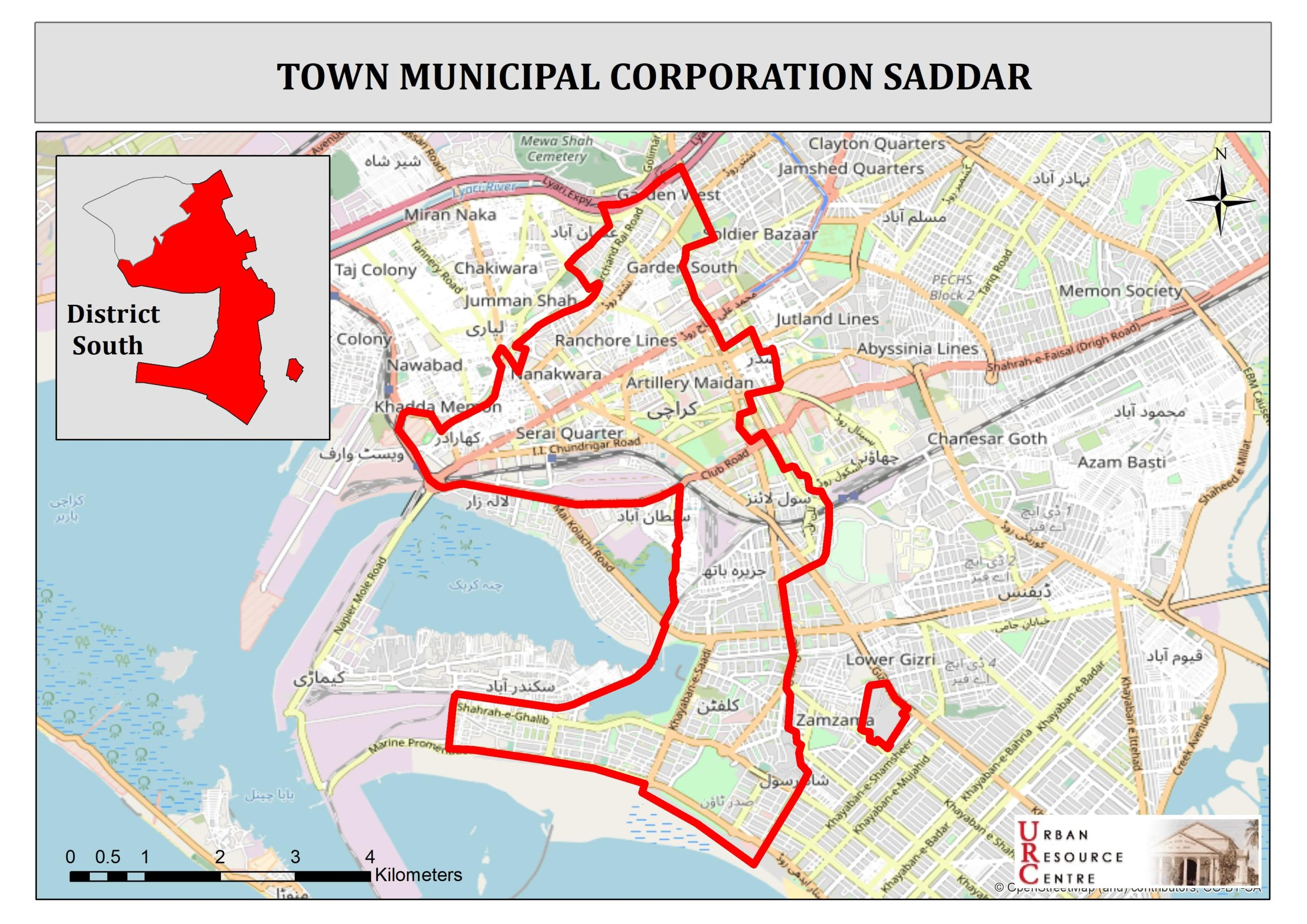
- Saddar Town Map
- Country: Pakistan
- Province: Sindh
- District: Karachi District
- Division: Karachi Division
- Town Chairman: Mansoor Ahmed Sheikh
- Established: 1972; 54 years ago
- Town status: 14 August 2001; 25 years ago
- Disbanded: 11 July 2011; 15 years ago
- Union Committees in Town Municipal Corporation: 13: Bhim Pura-Ghanchi Para Hassan Lashkari Village Garden Millat Nagar Ranchor Line-Ghazdarabad Nanakwara Old Town Kharadar City Railway Colony Saddar Hijrat Colony Frere Town Boat Basin Clifton-Kehkshan

Government
  - Type: Government of Karachi
  - Constituency: NA-241 Karachi South-III

Area
  - Total: 35 km^{2} (14 sq mi)
- Elevation: 14 m (46 ft)
- Highest elevation: 62 m (203 ft)
- Lowest elevation: −6 m (−20 ft)

Population (2023 Pakistani census)
  - Total: 159,363
  - Density: 4,553.23/km^{2} (11,792.8/sq mi)
- Demonym: Karachiite
- Time zone: UTC+05:00 (PKT)
  - Summer (DST): DST is not observed
- ZIP Code: 74400
- NWD (area) code: 021
- ISO 3166 code: PK-SD

Saddar Town (صدر ٹاؤن) lies in the Karachi District South that forms much of the historic colonial core of Karachi, in the Sindh province of Pakistan. According to the 2023 Pakistani census, Saddar Subdivision has a population 159,363.

== Town Municipal Committee ==
The Town Municipal Committee Saddar (TMC Saddar) is a local government body in Karachi, Pakistan, responsible for providing municipal services within its designated jurisdiction. It is one of the 26 Town Municipal Corporations established in Karachi under the Sindh Local Government Act, 2021.

The creation of the Town Municipal Committee Lyari is part of a restructuring of Karachi's local government system. The Sindh government replaced the previous seven District Municipal Corporations (DMCs) with 26 towns, each with its own municipal committee. Saddar Town is one of two towns located within the Karachi South District, alongside Lyari Town.

== Etymology ==
The word Saddar generally means the "center" (of a settlement) and also the "head" (of a group of people or an organisation). The word Saddar may loosely be translated into "Downtown" as it shares common characteristics with a Downtown of any particular city located in United States. This includes historic areas, attractions, being in the center etc.

== Location ==
Saddar Town is located in the colonial heart of Karachi. It is bordered by Jamshed Town and Clifton Cantonment to the east, Kiamari Town and the Arabian Sea to the south and Lyari Town to the west.

== Demographics ==
The ethnic group in saddar town includes Muhajirs, Sindhis, Punjabis, Pashtuns, Balochs, Saraikis, Kashmiris,Hindkowans, Memons, Bohra, Kutchis and many more.

Religions

Religions in Saddar sub-division (2023)
Religion	Percent
Islam	87.37%
Christianity	7.15%
Hinduism	4.94%
Parsi	0.31%
Other	0.21%

There are 139,240 Muslims, 11,407 Christians, 7,877 Hindus, 103 Ahmadiyya, 29 scheduled castes, 78 Sikhs, 501 Parsis and 128 others of total population 159,363 of Saddar sub-division.

== History ==
Saddar Town contained much of the oldest parts of Karachi. The federal government under Pervez Musharraf, introduced local government reforms in the year 2000, which eliminated the previous "third tier of government" (administrative divisions) and replaced it with the fourth tier (districts). The effect in Karachi was the dissolution of the former Karachi Division, and the merging of its five districts to form a new Karachi City-District with eighteen autonomous constituent towns including Saddar Town as part of The Local Government Ordinance 2001, and was subdivided into 13 union councils. In 2011, the system was disbanded but remained in place for bureaucratic administration until 2015, when the Karachi Metropolitan Corporation system was reintroduced.

In 2015, Saddar Town was re-organized as part of Karachi South.

In January 2022, the town system was restored by a Government of Sindh notification dividing Karachi South District into 2 towns including Saddar Town having 13 union councils.

== Neighbourhoods ==
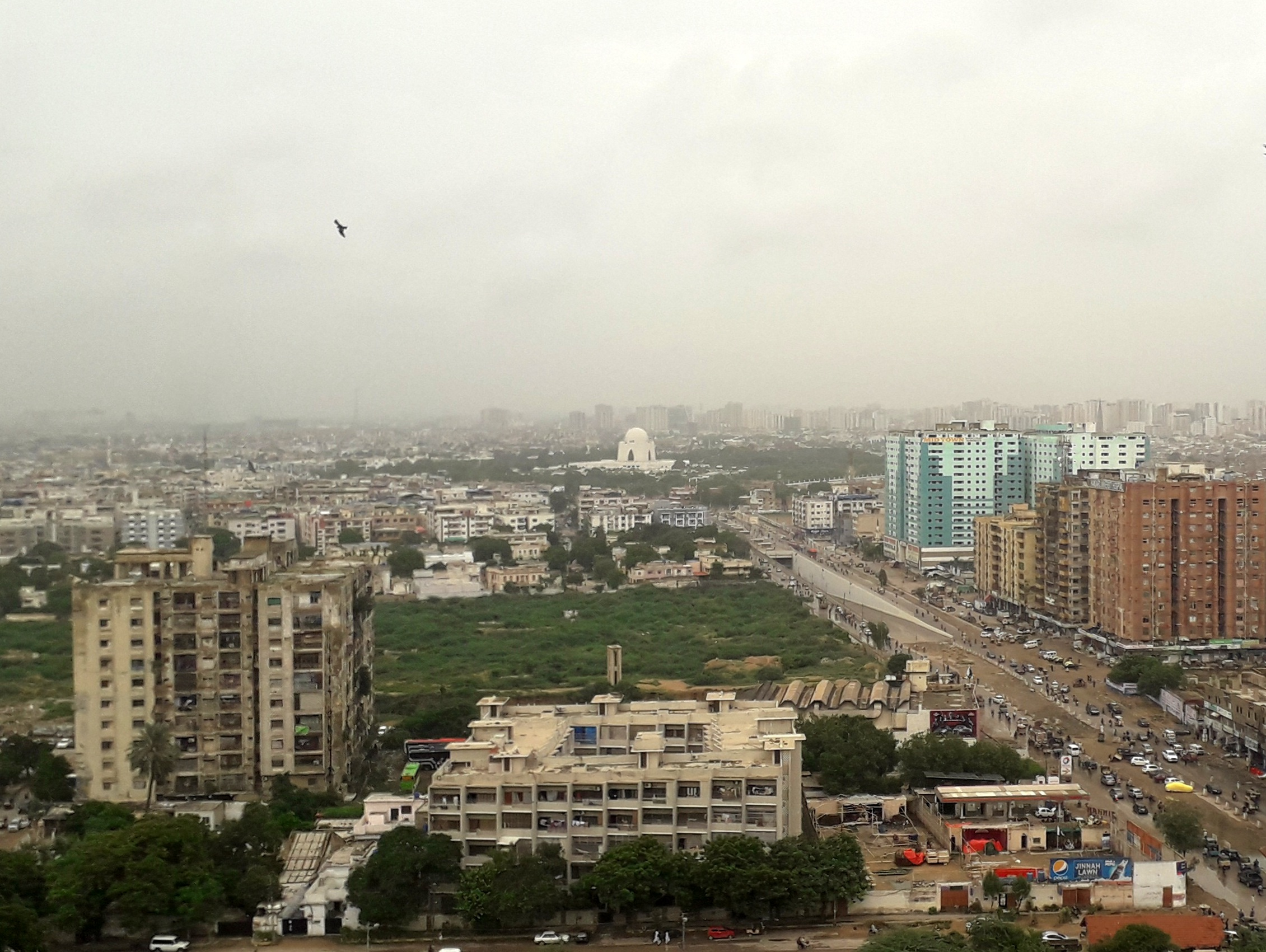
Aerial view of Sadar with Mazar-e-Quaid Tomb visible.

Saddar Town was made up of the following:

- Bohri Bazaar
- Bath Island
- Clifton
- City Railway Colony
- Civil Lines
- Garden
- Gazdarabad
- Islam Pura
- Kalakot
- Kehkashan
- Kharadar
- Ghanchi Para
- Millat Nagar
- Nanak Wara
- Narayan Pura
- Old Haji Camp
- Ranchore Line
- Saddar
- Staff Lines Cantt
- Iqbal Lines Cantt
- Army Officers Mess
- Jinnah Lines Cantt
- Umerkot Lines Cantt
- Askari-I Cantt
- Askari-II Cantt
- Askari-III Cantt
- Com Kar Cantt
- Abdul Sattar Edhi Hockey Stadium Cantt.
- Shah Rasool Colony
- Sikanderabad
- Shireen Jinnah Colony

== See also ==
- Saddar
- Karachi
- Darya Lal Mandir
