= Ghanchi Para =

Neighbourhood in Karachi, Pakistan

Ghanchi Para is a neighbourhood in District South of Karachi, Pakistan. It previously used to be part of Saddar Town.

The name Ghanchi Para literally means Ghanchi quarter, and is home to the Ghanchi community. In addition to the Ghanchi, the area is also home to a number of other Gujarati Muslim communities such as Chhipa, Memon and Tai.

== See also ==
- Ghanchi
