= Muhammad Yousuf Baloch =

Pakistani politician

Muhammad Yousuf Baloch is a Pakistani politician who has been a Member of the Provincial Assembly of Sindh since 2024.

== Political career ==
He was elected to the 16th Provincial Assembly of Sindh as a candidate of the Pakistan People's Party from constituency PS-107 Karachi South-II in the 2024 Pakistani general election.
