= Shah Baig Line =

Residential neighborhood locality in Karachi, Pakistan

Shah Baig Line شاه بيگ لاین
- Neighbourhood
- Country: Pakistan
- City: Karachi
- District: Karachi South
- Time zone: UTC+5 (PST)
- Postal code: 75300

Shah Baig Line (Urdu: شاه بيگ لاین) is a residential neighbourhood in Lyari, located in the Karachi South district of Karachi, Pakistan.

The population of Shah Baig Line comprises several ethnic groups, including Kutchis, Muhajirs, Sindhis, Punjabis, Kashmiris, Seraikis, Pakhtuns, Baloch, Memons, Bohras and Ismailis.
