= Lyari Expressway Resettlement Project =

Civic project in Karachi, Pakistan

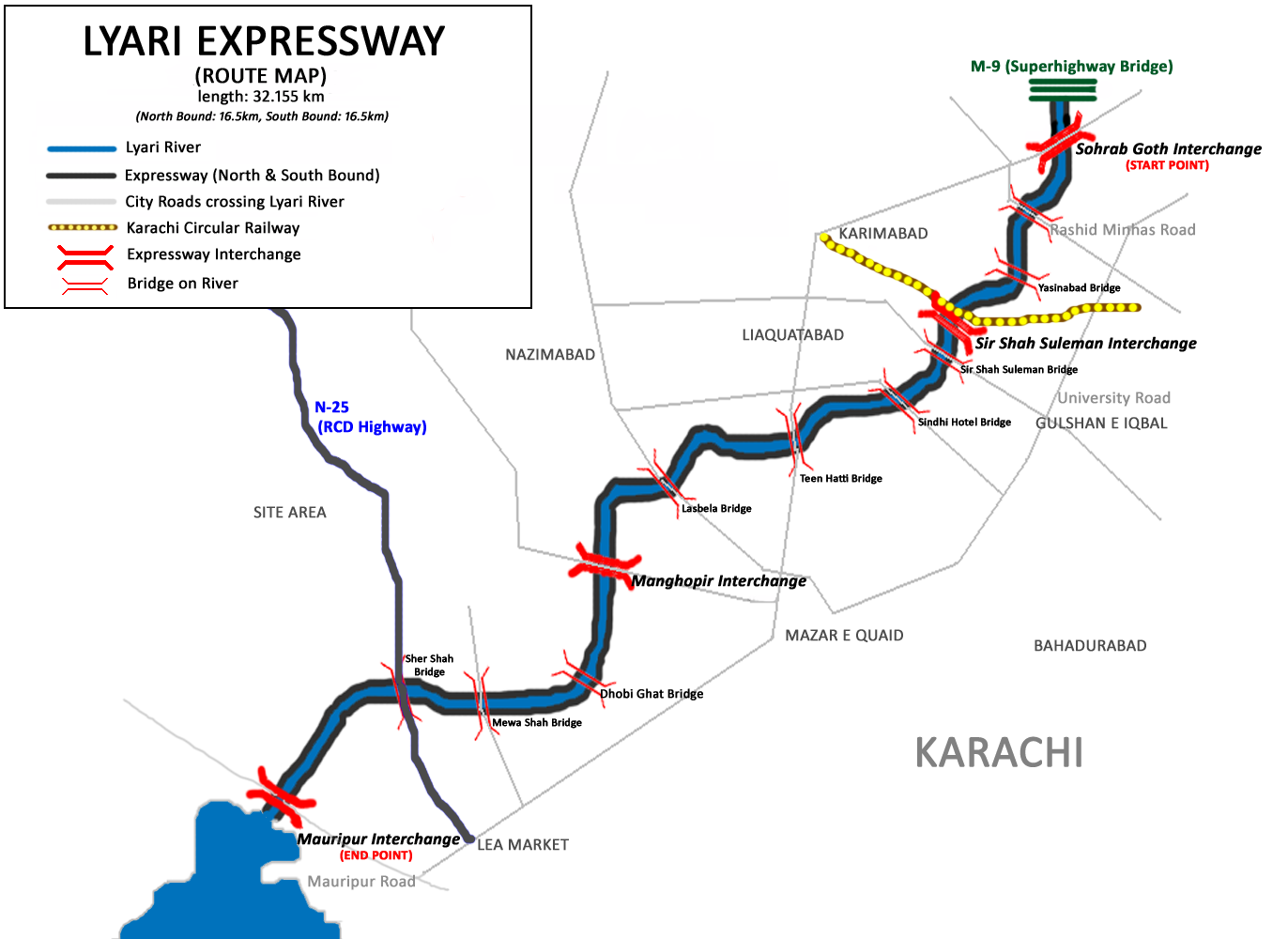
Lyari Expressway – Route Map

Lyari Expressway Resettlement Project (LERP) is a civic project in Karachi, Sindh, Pakistan to provide replacement housing in developed suburbs for people displaced by the construction of the Lyari Expressway. Over 250,000 residents of the land near the Lyari River were left homeless by the construction of the highway, but provided land and compensation for relocation in areas including the new developments Hawke's Bay, Baldia and Taiser Town.

== Background ==
Karachi is one of the most populated cities in the world, its population having risen from 250,000 to more than 15 million in the six decades since Pakistani Independence. Karachi constitutes ten per cent of the total population of the country. Uncontrolled influx of population from other parts of Pakistan has contributed to infrastructure, housing, and education problems. Furthermore, the city is an industrial and commercial hub with two major ports, causing even greater traffic pressure and pollution. One-third of the total vehicles in Pakistan are registered in Karachi.

To facilitate the traffic in the city, the government planned a number of projects for the construction of bypasses and highways. Under the 1975–85 Master Plan, the Northern Bypass was presented, but for a number of reasons it was not completed. In 1989, citizens groups suggested an expressway along the Lyari River, but this project was also shelved. However, in 2001 the government decided to implement both of these projects.

At present, the Lyari Expressway and the Northern Bypass projects are on the priority list, and implementation has started on these projects. Lyari Expressway l, which is almost complete, being built along the bank of the Lyari River, beginning from Mauripur and ending at Sohrab Goth will reduce traffic pressure on city roads.

== History ==
The resettlement was started in 2001 and is in final stages of its completion. There are 5,434 plots in the Hawke's Bay site. 5,100 families have been given possession of their homes. During the first phase of resettlement, people were transferred to sectors 6, 9 and 10 of the Hawksbay Scheme 42. In the second phase of resettlement underway at Taiser Town, over 21,000 families have been given a plot of 80 sq-yd and Rs. 50,000 each. Of these, some 15,000 families have built their homes and are now living there. The Baldia site is spread over 145 acres, and 2924 plots have been allocated for resettlement.

== Life in the resettlement sites ==
At present 40 schools, including a high school, are functioning in the sites of Hawke's Bay and Taiser Town. Students also attend summer school, which ends with a visit to Karachi’s historical and recreational places. Under the resettlement program, in Hawke's Bay and Taiser Town groups consisting of three teachers, three boys and three girls went house to house to enroll new students in school. The girls were especially enthusiastic about enrolling other girls who had previously not been able to go to school.

In the resettlement areas, a new tradition has begun, in which national days, such as Pakistan Day, are marked by planting trees. Residents also gather to offer a thanksgiving prayer and plant a tree whenever construction begins on a new house.

Bazaars and shopping centers have also been set up to provide employment opportunities to the new population. The resettlement project has also provided health and medical facilities, and government dispensaries. Construction material is supplied at a rate cheaper than the open market price. Electricity has been provided, including road and street lights.

== See also ==
- Lyari
- Lyari Development Authority
- Lyari Town
