= Taiser Town =

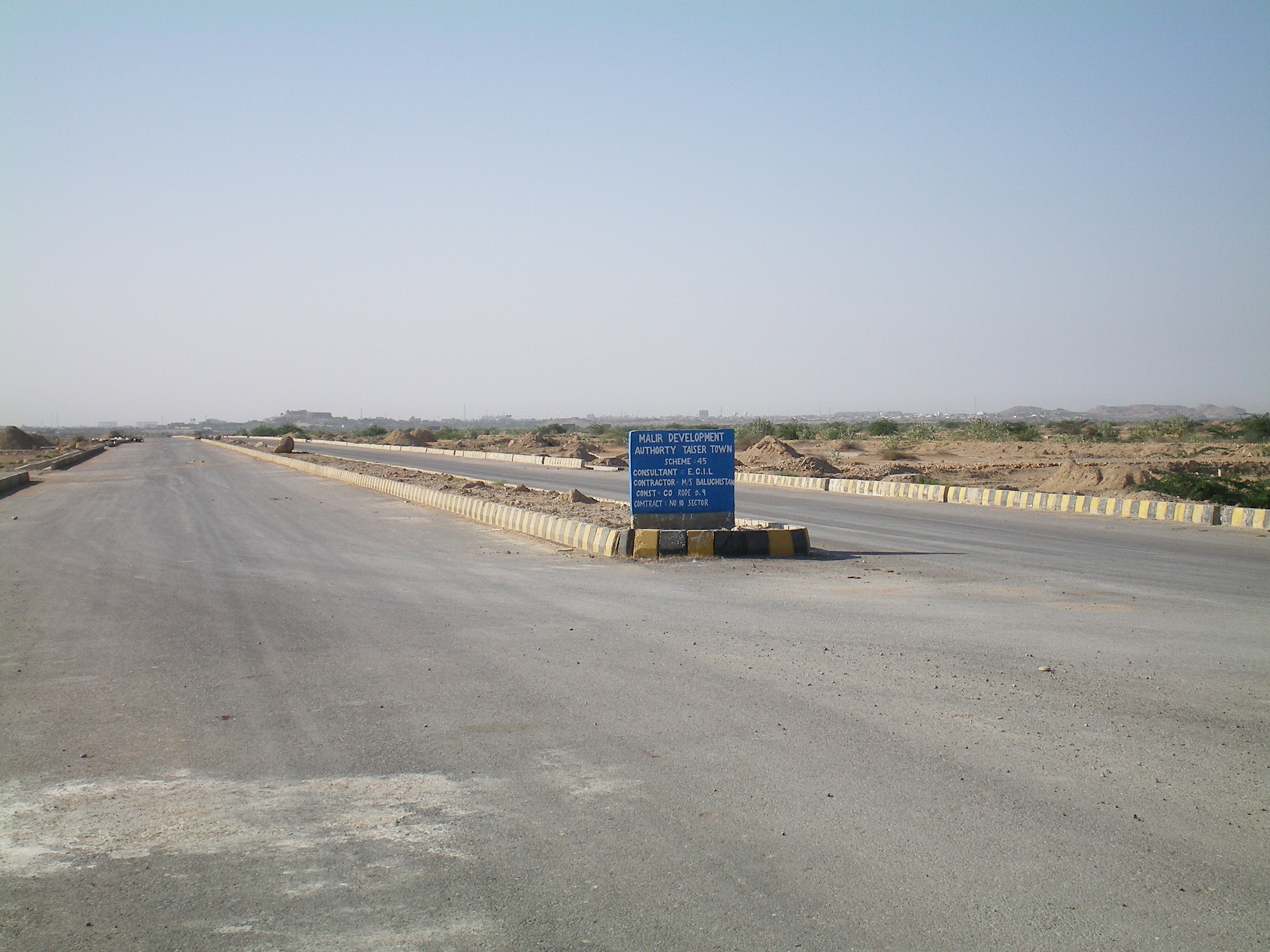
Taiser Town Scheme-45, Karachi

Taiser Town or Taiser Town Scheme-45 (Urdu: تیسر ٹاؤن) is a neighborhood in Malir Town in Karachi, Sindh, Pakistan. It was established by the Malir Development Authority to resettle people displaced due to the construction of the Lyari Expressway along the Lyari River. It is located near the Gulshan-e-Maymar toll plaza, northern bypass and Khuda Ki Basti. Taiser Town is also known as Lyari Basti.

Taiser Town is near Khuda Ki Basti and the northern bypass. Taiser town people are compelled to purchase dirty water from tanker Mafia. Taiser town people belongs to lower middle class people. Taiser Town have unsolved sewerage problem and other problems as well like drinking water, sewerage, electricity, dustbin (garbage), broken roads and gas and electricity meter since 2005 etc. Gas & electricity available here since 2018.

== Etymology ==
Taiser was a sister of Mokhi (a folk story which is covered in the poetry of Shah Abdul Latif Bhittai), the Taiser town is named after Taiser.

== Demographics ==
Ethnic groups include Muhajirs, Punjabis, Sindhis, Kashmiris, Seraikis, Pakhtuns, Baloch, Memons. Over 99% of the population is Muslim. The population of Malir Town is estimated to be nearly one million. Muhajirs are majority ethnicity in Taiser town.

== See also ==
- Malir Development Authority
- Lyari Expressway Resettlement Project
- City District Government Karachi
