= Islam Pura =

Neighbourhood of Karachi, Pakistan

Coordinates: 33°40′N 73°41′E

Islam Pura (Urdu: اسلام پورہ) is a neighbourhood in District South of Karachi, Pakistan.

There are several ethnic groups in Islam Pura including Muhajirs, Sindhis, Punjabis, Kashmiris, Seraikis, Pakhtuns, Balochis, Memons, Bohras, Ismailis, etc. The population of Saddar Town is estimated to be nearly one million.

== Main areas ==
- Dharam Siwara
- Azeem Plaza Area
- Shoe Market
- Bhatti Compound
- Haq Nagar
- Hashim Khan Baghicha
- Zoological Garden

== See also ==
- Millat Nagar
