= Ghanchi (Muslim) =

Gujarati Muslim community

The Ghanchi (Gujarati: ઘાંચી, Hindi: घांची, Urdu: گھانچی) or Ghanchi-Pinjara are a Muslim community found in the states of Gujarat and Rajasthan in India. A small number of Ghanchi are also found in the city of Karachi in Pakistan.

== Ghanchi of Pakistan ==
The city of Karachi in Pakistan is home to a large community of Ghanchis. Many are settled in the locality of Ghanchi Para, as well as other parts of Saddar Town in Karachi.

== See also ==
- Ghanchi
