= Teli =

Caste in India, Nepal and Pakistan

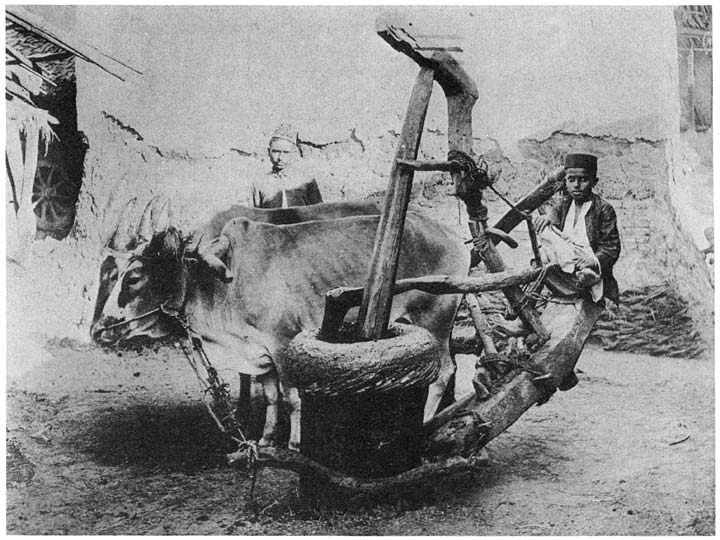
- Teli oil press (Russell, 1916)
- Classification: Other Backward Class
- Religions: Hinduism, Islam, Jainism, Sikhism, Christianity, Judaism
- Languages: Hindi • Urdu • Bengali • Awadhi • Bhojpuri • Odia • Chhattisgarhi • Gujarati • Rajasthani • Haryanvi • Marathi • Punjabi • Telugu • Braj Bhasha • Bundeli • Bagheli • Kannauji • Magahi • Maithili
- Country: India, Nepal, Pakistan
- Related groups: Roshandaar, Ghanchi, Ganiga, Cantar

Teli is a caste traditionally occupied in the oil pressing and trade in India, Nepal, and Pakistan. Members may be either Hindu or Muslim; Muslim Teli are called Roshandaar or Teli Malik. They are included in Other Backward Class (OBC) category list by the Central government but not the higher sub castes within Teli such as Telik Vaishya.

== History ==
In the Early Mediaeval period in some parts of South India, the Teli community used to work on their own oil presses to produce oil to be supplied to the temples. The emergence of "Temple towns" in various parts of south India was instrumental in the improvement of social status of some of the communities that were associated with the supply of essential items for cultural activities. The communities like Malakar (garland makers) and Telikars (oil pressers) thus became important for the functioning of such towns. Some of them even became prosperous enough to make donations to the temples.

In the first decade of the 20th century, upward mobilisation became the feature of Indian society when lower castes tried to move up in the socio-economic ladder by assuming the names and practices of "upper castes". Professor M. N. Srinivas notes the attempts of Teli community to claim different surnames in different censuses in a bid to improve their position in Varna system and Caste hierarchy. In 1911, the Teli community adopted the surname, Rathore and started calling themselves Rathore Teli; while in 1931 they claimed themselves to be Rathore-Vaishya. According to Shankaragouda Hanamantagouda Patil, this was done in order to climb the social ladder. Such practices were common amongst the lower castes in India. The Arya Samaj movement also attempted to improve the status of lower castes. As in the case of Telis, Shri Satyavrat Sharma Dwivedi an Arya Samajist from Farrukhabad published a magazine "Telivarna Prakash" to prove the Teli caste to be of Vaishya varna.

Despite the later attempts to claim higher status Teli were initially considered as Shudra and were thought to be lower in status. According to Anand Yang, the Telis worked with beast of burden in the oil pressers and for the purpose of obtaining the desired results from the animals, they were often blinded. This made them ritually impure but later many of them as Yang notes took up the occupation of trading and branched off as Bania in order to conceal the impurity of their origin.

== Subdivisions ==
The Telis of Bengal share their social position with communities like Suvarna Banik, Gandhabanik, Saha. Further, the Ghanchi community of Gujarat have been described as a "counterpart" of the Telis.

== Politics ==
=== Bihar ===
In the post Mandal phase the growing differences between upper castes and OBC due to tussle between the two groups over political power culminated into replacement of upper castes by the OBCs in the political circle. The Telis along with Yadav, Kurmi, Koeri and Bania took over the erstwhile political elites namely Brahmin, Bhumihar, Rajput and Kayastha.The OBCs in Bihar are divided into upper and lower OBC on the basis of socio-economic mobility and political representation. The trio of Yadav, Kurmi and Koeri are considered as upper OBC; Teli along with Kanu, Dhanuk, Kahar, Kumhar and others are classified as lower OBC. In the late 2000s, some among the Teli community of Bihar, organised by the Teli Sena, were engaging in vote bank politics as they sought to achieve categorisation as a Most Backward Class in the state. Initially, they had failed to achieve this repositioning in India's official positive discrimination scheme, with opposition coming from other groups who considered the Teli to be too populous and socio-economically influential to justify the change. In April 2015, Bihar chief Minister Nitish Kumar announced a decision to include the Teli caste in the list of Extremely Backward Class in Bihar. As per the report of Bihar caste-based survey 2022, the population of Teli in Bihar is 2.81%.

=== Jharkhand ===
In 2018 the Bharatiya Janata Party led government in Jharkhand tried to include castes like Teli and Kurmi in the category of Scheduled Tribes, which was welcomed by protests from tribals of Jharkhand under the banner of Jai Adivasi Yuvashakti (JAY) a local organisation which organised "Adivasi Akrosh Maharally", a gathering of all principal tribal groups of the state to protest against the same.

=== Maharashta ===
Teli form as a major caste in Vidarbha. They are found in every district of Maharashtra.

=== Chhattisgarh ===
Teli are known as Sahu in Chhattisgarh.

== Telis in Nepal ==
The Central Bureau of Statistics of Nepal classifies the Teli as a subgroup within the broader social group of Madheshi Other Caste. At the time of the 2011 Nepal census, 369,688 people (1.4% of the population of Nepal) were Teli. The frequency of Telis by province was as follows:

- Madhesh Province (5.1%)
- Koshi Province (0.9%)
- Lumbini Province (0.9%)
- Bagmati Province (0.2%)
- Gandaki Province (0.1%)
- Karnali Province (0.0%)
- Sudurpashchim Province (0.0%)

The frequency of Telis was higher than national average (1.4%) in the following districts:

- Saptari (7.3%)
- Rautahat (5.6%)
- Sarlahi (5.4%)
- Dhanusha (5.2%)
- Siraha (4.8%)
- Parsa (4.2%)
- Bara (4.1%)
- Mahottari (4.1%)
- Parasi (3.3%)
- Sunsari (2.3%)
- Kapilvastu (1.9%)
- Morang (1.6%)

== See also ==
- Other Backward Class
- Ghanchi (Muslim)
