= Agra Taj Colony =

Neighbourhood locality in the city of Karachi, Pakistan

Coordinates: 24°52′N 66°59′E

Agra Taj Colony آگرہ تاج کالونی'
- Neighbourhood
- Interactive map of Agra Taj Colony آگرہ تاج کالونی'
- Country: Pakistan
- City: Karachi
- District: Karachi South
- Time zone: UTC+5 (PST)
- Postal code: 75300

Agra Taj Colony (Urdu: آگرہ تاج کالونی, Sindhi: آگرہ تاج ڪالوني ) is a neighbourhood locality in Lyari Town, located in the Karachi South district of Karachi, Pakistan.
