= Syed Abdul Rasheed =

Pakistani politician

Member of the Provincial Assembly of Sindh
- In office 13 August 2018 – 11 August 2023
- Constituency: PS-108 Karachi South-II

Personal details
- Party: Jamaat-e-Islami Pakistan

Syed Abdul Rasheed is a Pakistani politician who had been a member of the Provincial Assembly of Sindh from August 2018 to August 2023.

== Political career ==
He was elected to the Provincial Assembly of Sindh as a candidate of Jamaat-e-Islami from Constituency PS-108 (Karachi South-II) in 2018 Pakistani general election. In February 2022, the lawmaker had locked himself up with the Karachi Sewerage Board Official responsible for his area's sewerage, as a protest to resolve sewerage problems of his area. After several hours of protest, he later left on the solemn promise of KWSB MD to resolve the issues of sewerage in Liyari.

On 29 July 2022, he was arrested for protesting peacefully against the dilapidated sewerage system in his constituency of Liyari. The sewerage board in Liyari was then under management of provincial government of Pakistan People's Party.
