= Bihar Colony =

Neighbourhood locality in the city of Karachi, Pakistan

Bihar Colony بہار کالونی
- Neighbourhood
- Interactive map of Bihar Colony بہار کالونی
- Country: Pakistan
- City: Karachi
- District: Karachi South
- Time zone: UTC+5 (PST)
- Postal code: 75300

Bihar Colony (Urdu: بہار کالونی) is a neighbourhood locality in Lyari Town, located in the Karachi South district of Karachi, Pakistan.

== Geo links ==
- 24.873277°N 66.987784°E
