= Hijrat Colony =

Neighbourhood of Lyari Town

Coordinates: 24°52′N 67°01′E

Hijrat Colony (Urdu: ھجرت کالونی) is one of the neighbourhoods of Lyari Town in Karachi, Sindh, Pakistan.

There are several ethnic groups in Hijrat Colony including Muhajirs, Sindhis, Punjabis, Kashmiris, Seraikis, Pakhtuns, Balochis, Memons, Bohras, Ismailis and Christians.

Hijrat Colony is the most populated part of Saddar Town, District South Karachi. It consist of different ethnic groups, like Hazarvi (Hindko speaking), Pashtoons, Muhajirs, Saraiki, Sindhi and Baloch. It is the most peaceful area of Karachi.
