= Millat Nagar =

Neighbourhood of Karachi, Pakistan

Millat Nagar (Urdu: ملت نگر) is a neighbourhood in District South of Karachi, Pakistan.

There are several ethnic groups in Millat Nagar including Muhajirs, Sindhis, Punjabis, Kashmiris, Seraikis, Pakhtuns, Balochis, Memons, Bohras and Ismailis.

== Main areas ==
- Dharam Siwara
- Azeem Plaza Area
- Shoe Market
- Bhatti Compound
- Haq Nagar
- Hashim Khan Baghicha
- Zoological Garden

== See also ==
- Islam Pura
