= Karachi South District =

Coordinates: 24.8605°N 67.0261°E

Karachi District: ڪراچي ضلعو; ضلع کراچی
- District South
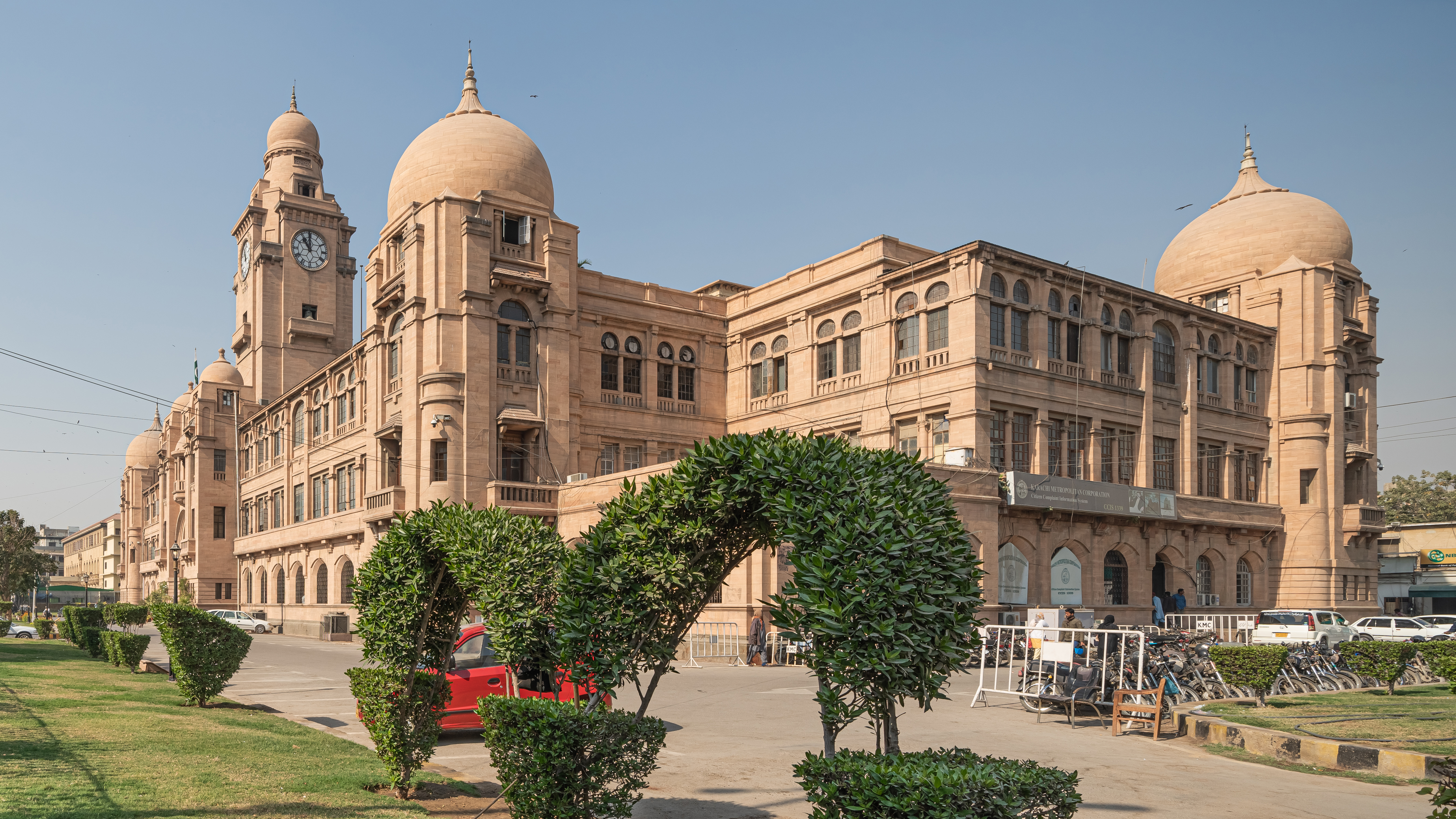
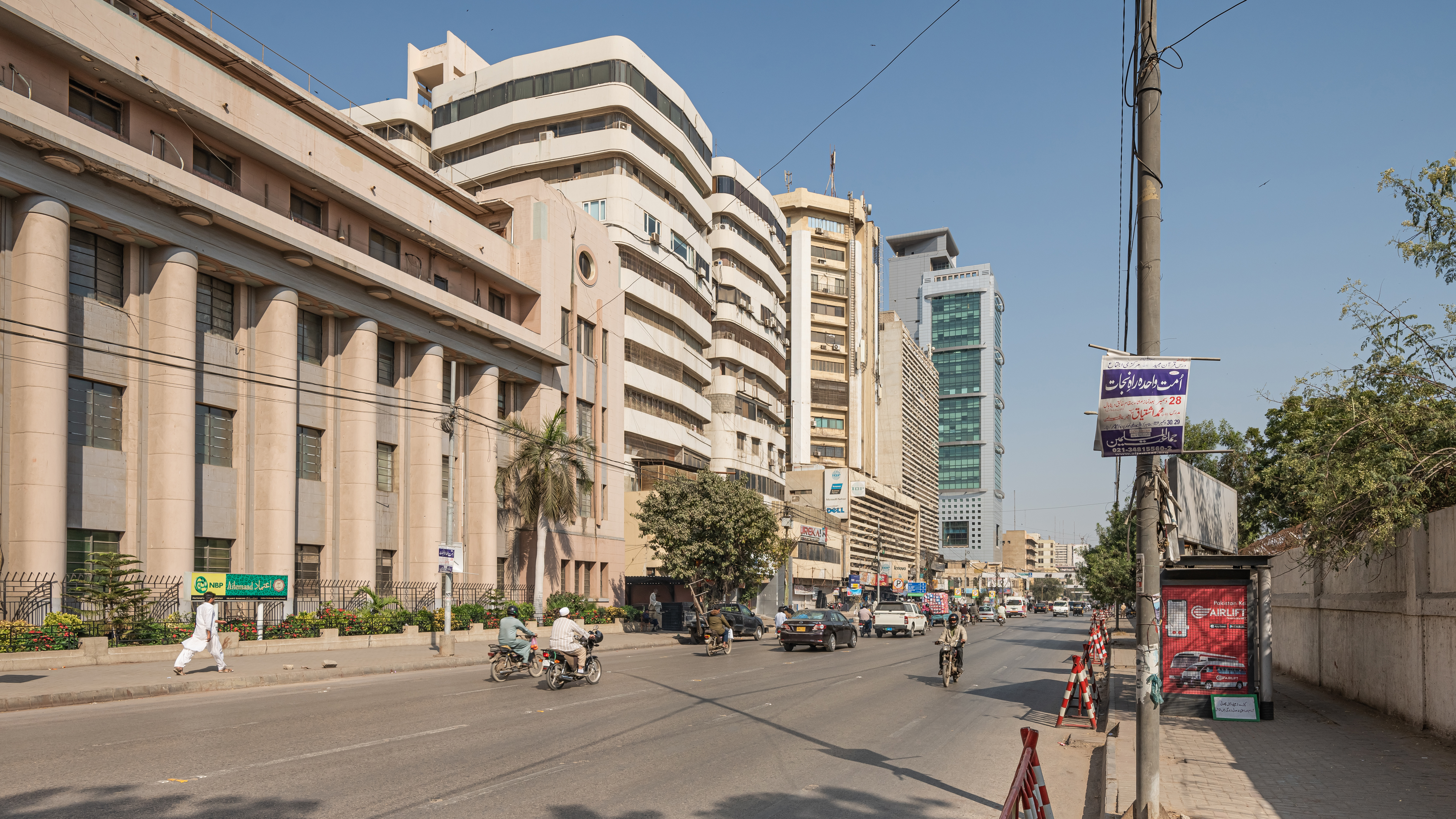
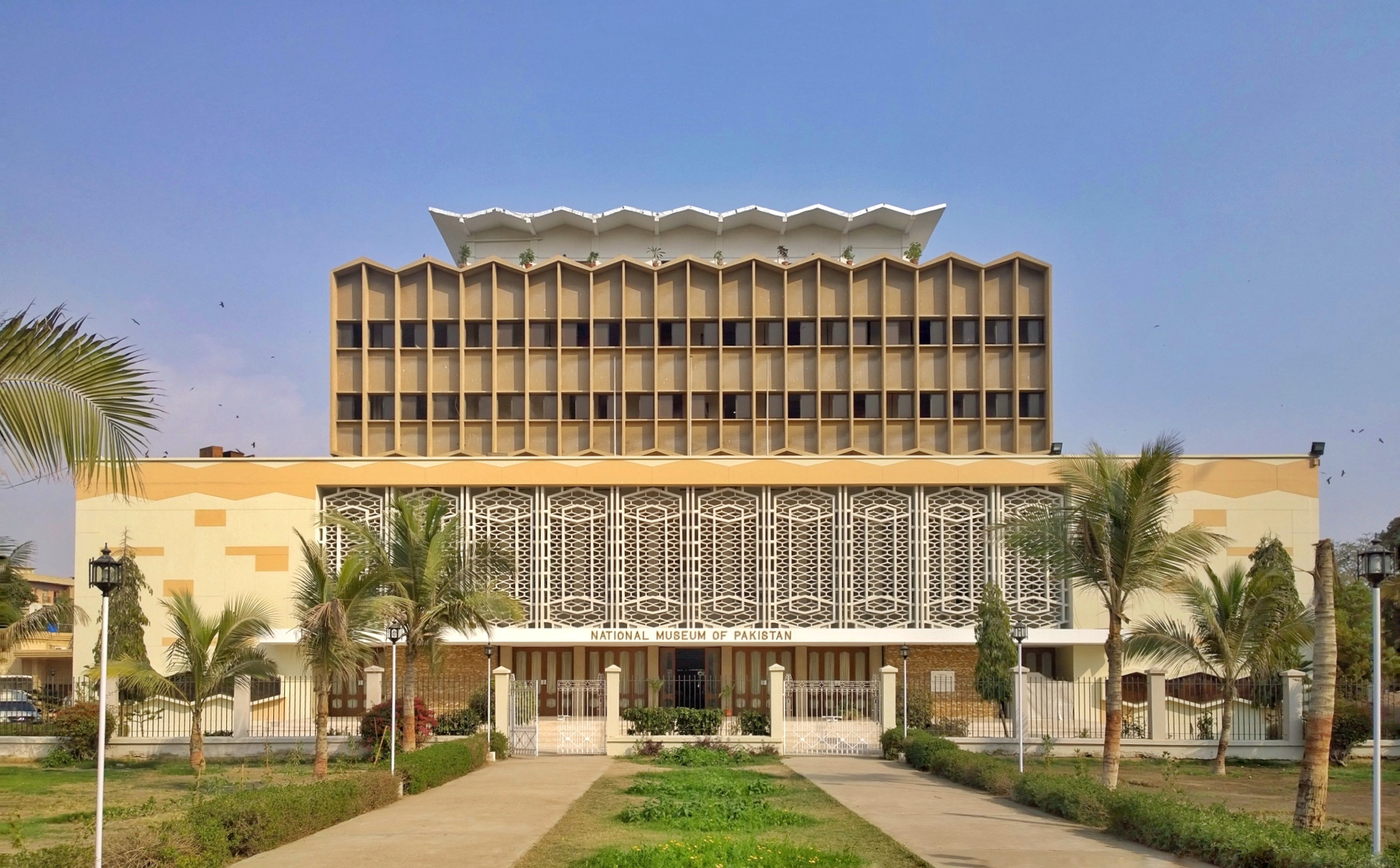
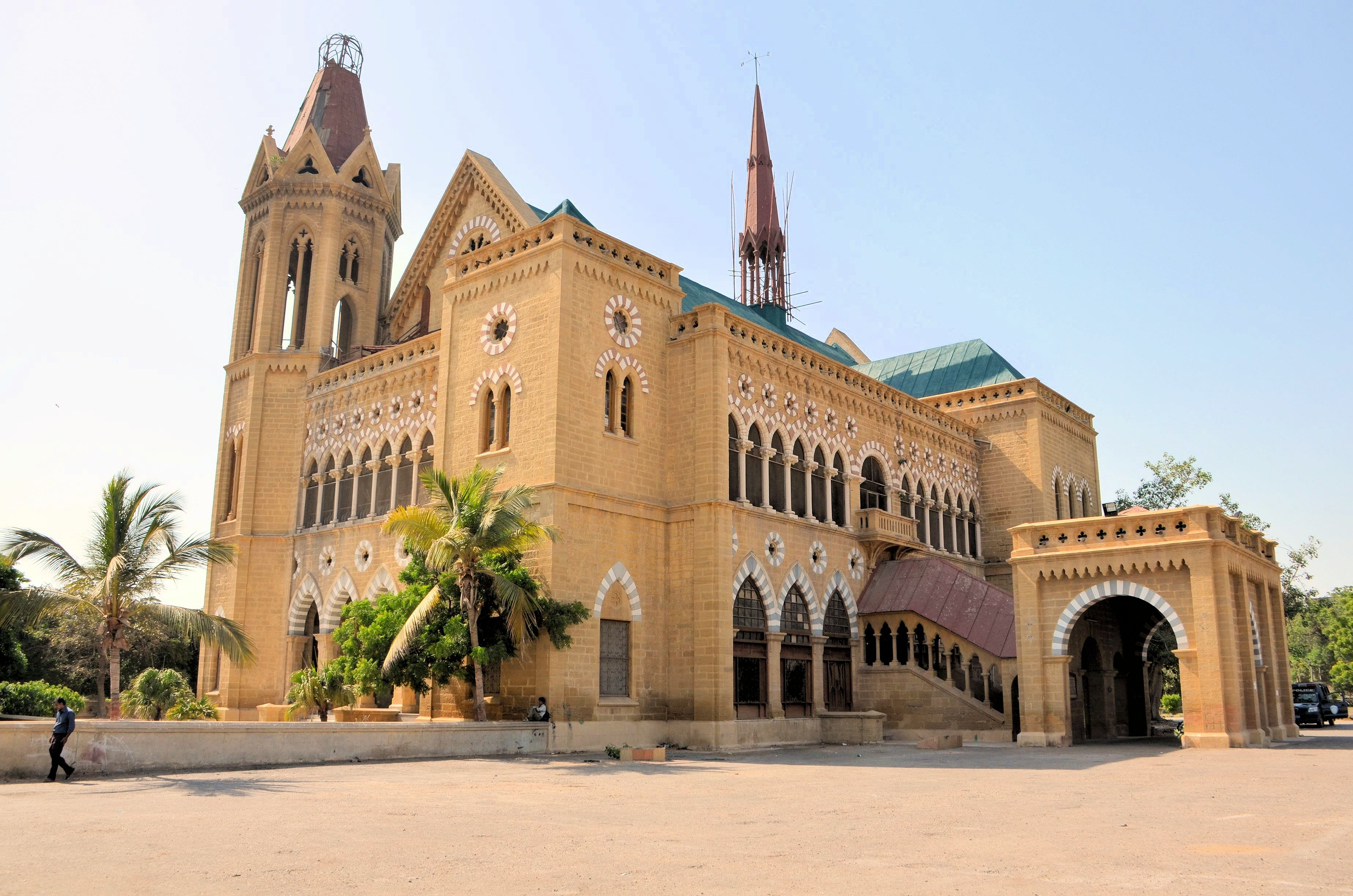
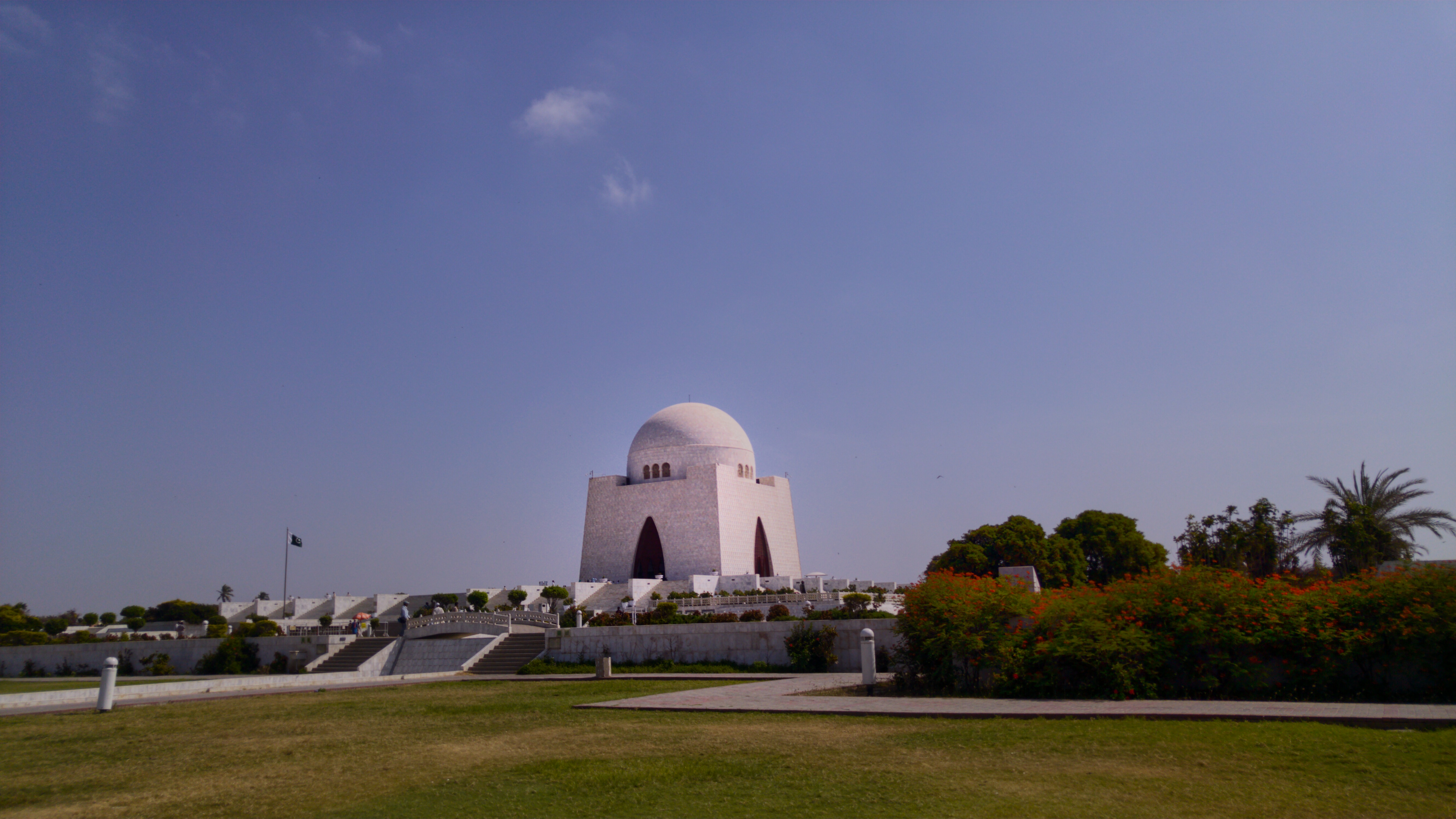
- Clockwise from top-left: Old Karachi Municipal Corporation, I. I. Chundrigar Road, Frere Hall, View of Mazar-e-Quaid, National Museum of Pakistan

- Map of Karachi District
- Country: Pakistan
- Province: Sindh
- Division: Karachi
- Established: 1972; 54 years ago
- Re-established: 11 July 2011
- Headquarters: DC South
- Boroughs: 5: Aram Bagh Subdivision; Civil Line Subdivision; Garden Subdivision; Lyari Subdivision; Saddar Subdivision

Government
  - Deputy Commissioner: Altaf Hussain Sario
  - Constituensy: NA-239 Karachi South-I; NA-240 Karachi South-II; NA-241 Karachi South-III

Area
  - Total: 122 km^{2} (47 sq mi)
- Elevation: 14 m (46 ft)

Population (2023 Pakistani census)
  - Total: 2,329,764
  - Density: 19,096.4/km^{2} (49,459/sq mi)
- Demonym: Karachiite

Literacy
  - Literacy rate: Total: 78.57%; Male: 80.76%; Female: 76.05%
- Time zone: UTC+05:00 (PKT)
  - Summer (DST): DST is not observed
- ZIP Code: 74400
- NWD (area) code: 021
- ISO 3166 code: PK-SD
- CNIC Code of District Karachi South: 42301-XXXXXXX-X
- Website: dcsouthkarachi.gos.pk

Karachi District (formerly Karachi South District) (Urdu: ضلع کراچی) is an administrative district of Karachi Division in Sindh, Pakistan, created in 1972. Karachi District had a population of 2,329,764 (2.3 million) as of the 2023 Pakistani census.

In 2023, the Government of Sindh renamed Karachi South District simply to Karachi District because all divisional administration is located there.

== Town Municipal Committee ==
As per the Sindh Local Government Act, 2021, Sindh government replaced the previous seven District Municipal Corporations (DMCs) with 26 towns, each with its own municipal committee. Karachi South District has two towns.

- Saddar Town
- Lyari Town

== History ==
Karachi South District is the economic backbone of the country. It has the Head Offices of many Corporations, Companies and Banks. The Chief Secretary House, Governor House, Chief Minister House, Commissioner House, Commissioner Office, Sindh Assembly, High Court, Embassies and Consulates of different countries and other government offices are also located there.

The district was abolished in 2000, and was divided into two towns namely: Jamshed Town, and Saddar Town.

On 11 July 2011, the Sindh Government restored Karachi South District.

In November 2013, Jamshed Town was added into Karachi East District, after three eastern towns of that district split up to form a new district named Korangi. Now Karachi South comprise Saddar along with Clifton and Defence area. Karachi South is considered to be the most affluent area of the city.

In 2022, it was divided into two towns namely Saddar Town and Lyari Town.

In 2023, the Sindh Government renamed Karachi South District to Karachi District.

== Demographics ==
Historical population
Year	Pop.	±% p.a.
1961	...	—
1972	...	—
1981	...	—
1998	1,468,579	—
2017	1,769,230	+0.99%
2023	2,329,764	+4.69%

As of the 2023 census, Karachi South district has 425,093 households and a population of 2,329,764. The district has a sex ratio of 114.00 males to 100 females and a literacy rate of 78.57%: 80.76% for males and 76.05% for females. 487,047 (20.91% of the surveyed population) are under 10 years of age. The entire population lives in urban areas.

=== Language ===
Languages of Karachi South district (2023)
1. Urdu (34.7%)
2. Sindhi (15.6%)
3. Balochi (11.6%)
4. Pashto (9.42%)
5. Punjabi (8.17%)
6. Hindko (3.71%)
7. Saraiki (2.64%)
8. Others (14.2%)

At the time of the 2023 census, 808,465 of the population spoke Urdu, 363,930 Sindhi, 269,872 Balochi, 219,474 Pashto, 190,438 Punjabi, 86,498 Hindko and 61,543 Saraiki, 5,370 Kashmiri, 8,434 Brahui, 498 Shina, 1,169 Balti, 1,501 Mewati, 56 Kalasha, 551 Kohistani, 311,965 others as their first language. A large percentage of the population speaks languages recorded as other on the census, such as Gujarati.

=== Religion ===
The majority religion is Islam, with 93.85% of the population. Hinduism (including Scheduled Castes) is practiced by 4.24% and Christianity by 1.65% of the population.

Religions in Karachi South district (2023)
Religion	Percent
Islam	93.85%
Hinduism	4.24%
Christianity	1.65%
Other or not stated	0.26%

== Towns & Union Councils ==
Following is the list of two administrative towns of Karachi District.

=== Saddar Town ===
Union Council
U.C. 1 Ghanchi Para
U.C. 2 Hasan Lashkari Village
U.C. 3 Garden
U.C. 4 Millat Nagar
U.C. 5 Gazdarabad
U.C. 6 Nanak Wara
U.C. 7 Old Town Kharadar
U.C. 8 City Railway Colony
U.C. 9 Saddar
U.C. 10 Hijrat Colo
U.C. 11 Frere Town
U.C. 12 Boat Basin
U.C. 13 Clifton - Kehkashan

=== Lyari Town ===
Union Council
U.C. 1 Agra Taj Colony
U.C. 2 Bihar Colony
U.C. 3 Gulshan Colony
U.C. 4 Singo Lane
U.C. 5 Nawa Lane
U.C. 6 Kalakot - Rexer Lanes
U.C. 7 Ghulam Muhammad Lane - Ragiwara
U.C. 8 Kalari - Shah Baig Line
U.C. 9 Daryaabad - Hingorabad
U.C. 10 Khadda Memon Society
U.C. 11 Nayaabad
U.C. 12 Baghdadi
U.C. 13 Jinnahabad - Ghulam Shah Lane

== See also ==
- Darya Lal Mandir
