= Kehkashan =

Neighbourhood in Karachi

Coordinates: 24°50′N 67°02′E

Kehkashan (Urdu: کہکشان) is one of the neighbourhoods of Saddar Town in Karachi, Sindh, Pakistan.

There are several ethnic groups in Kehkashan including Muhajirs, Sindhis, Punjabis, Kashmiris, Seraikis, Pakhtuns, Balochis, Memons, Bohras, Ismailis, etc. Over 99% of the population is Muslim. The population of Saddar Town is estimated to be nearly one million.
