= Maheen Zia =

Pakistani film director and film editor

- ماہین ضیا
- Born: Pakistan
- Occupations: Director, editor, writer
- Years active: 2000 - present
- Awards: Tehran International Short Film Festival 2005 Hyderabad International Film Festival 2007

Maheen Zia is a Pakistani film director and film editor.

== Education ==
She has a degree in Radio/TV Production from Drake University, Des Moines, Iowa, United States and teaches at the Department of Visual Studies at the University of Karachi.

== Career ==
She has worked as an editor at a production house and made documentaries and short films on social issues and is one of the founder members and is on the organizing board of Pakistan's young, international film festival – The KaraFilm Festival (Karachi Film Festival).

She has served as Jury for International Film Festivals like Tehran International Short Film Festival 2005, Tehran, Iran, November 2005, Tampere Film Festival 2006, Tampere, Finland, March 2006, and Hyderabad International Film Festival 2007, Hyderabad, AP, India. The Berlinale lists her in their talent database. She is also actively involved with PAWS Pakistan Animal Welfare Society

Maheen Zia, is the winner of India EU Film Initiative – Berlin Today Award 08 for the film 'Match Factor' Maheen Zia worked as Juror for Afghanistan Competition of 2nd Kabul Documentary & Short Film Festival and also won the third prize of this festival for her documentary work 'The Women of Lahore' in the international competition section

Maheen Zia won the BERLIN TODAY AWARD 2008 for her short film Match Factor.

== Filmography ==
- Match Factor, 2008 short film [Writer, Director]
- Candle In The Dark, 2006 – documentary (Director)
- Gwadar – Between Golden Acres and the Deep Blue Sea, 2006 – documentary (Director)
- A Pakistani Love Story – short film, 2006 (Director)
- Aaj Bazar Mein (In Spirit & Flesh: The Women of Lahore's 'Diamond Market' (which is locally called in Pakistani Urdu language 'Heera Mandi') (Director)
- Eclipse – Short Film, August 2005 [Director, Writer, Editor]
- Building Bridges, 2005 – Documentary, (Director)
- Doctor – short film, 2003 (co-director)
- Multan: City of Living Crafts – documentary, 2003 (Writer, Editor, Director)
- The People vs. Lyari Expressway – documentary, 2002 (Writer, Editor, Director)
- Baba Snooker – short film, 2001 (Director)
- Raat Chali Hai Jhoom Ke – feature film, 2000 (Editor)
