= Lyari =

Locality in Karachi

Coordinates: 26°28′N 68°15′E

Lyari لیاری
- Locality
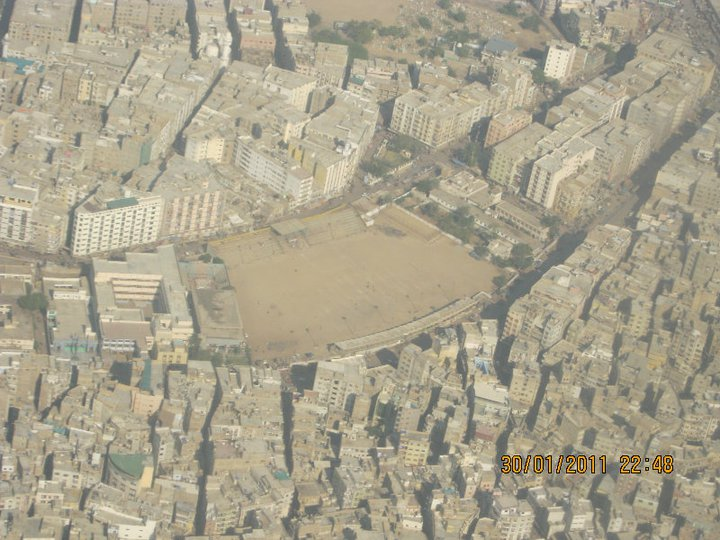
- Panoramic view of Lyari along with Kakri Football Ground
- Interactive map of Lyari لیاری
- Country: Pakistan
- Province: Sindh
- City District: Karachi
- Established: early 18th century

Government
  - MPA: Syed Abdul Rasheed (JIP)
  - MNA: Abdul Shakoor Shad (PTI)
  - Constituency: NA-239 Karachi South-I; PS-108 (Karachi South-II)

Lyari (Urdu: لیاری; Sindhi: لیاري; Balochi: لێاری) is a historic locality in Karachi, Pakistan. It is the most densely populated part of Karachi, and is one of its earliest settled areas.

== Etymology ==
Lyari's name is said to be derived from a Sindhi word lyar, a tree which grows along the banks of the river.

== History ==
=== Early settlement and pre-colonial period ===
Lyari is said to be one of the oldest inhabited parts of Karachi, and is referred to by its residents as the "Mother of Karachi." The first residents of Lyari were Sindhi fishermen and Baloch nomads (pawans). The first influx occurred in 1725, when Sindhi banyas (wāniya) came and expanded it, before Karachi was formally established in 1729. Further waves of Baloch migrants arrived in 1770 and 1795.

=== Colonial era (1839–1947) ===
The British East India Company captured Karachi on 3 February 1839. After Karachi was developed under British rule, large waves of Baloch migrants settled in the Lyari from Iranian Balochistan.

Lyari's population was 24,600 in 1886, and it was a majority-Muslim area of Karachi, which in turn was majority Hindu. At the time, the Lyari River flowed along the northern edge of Mithadar, with Lyari settlement across the river. As a result, the area was referred to as the Trans-Lyari Quarter during the British period. Lyari was neglected during this era, as the British administrators and Hindu mercantile community showed little interest in developing the Muslim-majority working-class locale, and instead chose to develop the port and eastern part of Karachi. As a result, Lyari developed in a haphazard manner, and was characterized by a cluster of poor settlements with home made of reed and mudbrick. One quarter of Karachi's entire population lived in the Trans-Lyari Quarter at the turn of the 20th century.

Migration of Iranian Baloch increased after some political unrest in parts of Iranian Balochistan in 1928. In 1941, the population of Lyari was 81,768.

=== Early post-independence period (1947–1960s) ===
After independence, neglect of Lyari continued. Development of Lyari at this time was focused on the northern outskirts, and included the planned neighborhoods of Agra Taj Colony and Bihar Colony - both of which were developed for migrants. By 1956, Lyari's population had rapidly grown to about 360,000. In the late 1950s, General Ayub Khan attempted to rehabilitate central Karachi by relocating Lyari's population to the northern neighborhood of New Karachi, which was fiercely opposed by the residents despite Lyari having no basic amenities at the time.

=== Urban culture and early crime (1960s–1980s) ===
Lyari's first criminal gangs took root in the 1960s, but were considered to be fairly harmless towards the local population. In the late 1970s, Lyari gave rise to its own music scene, known as "Lyari Disco." Lyari in the 70s also became a haven for drug traffickers who could avoid law enforcement agencies in the localities narrow lanes. By the 1980s, weapons from the Soviet–Afghan War arrived in Lyari, and drug-addiction became widespread. Some locals allege that drugs were pushed into the neighbourhood by the regime of Zia-ul-Haq in retaliation for Lyari's opposition to his rule. In 1987, Benazir Bhutto was elected to the National Assembly from a seat in Lyari.

=== Politicisation and gang violence (1980s–2013) ===
In the 1980s and 1990s, Lyaris gangster became entwined with local politicians. The PPP supported the gang of Uzair Baloch and Rehman Dakait to confront the MQM-back Arshad Pappu. In 2001, Lyari was amalgamated into Lyari Town - an administrative division that was officially reversed in 2013. During that period, Lyari was cut off from sources of revenue and "economically lucrative" areas in Karachi's District South, as it was made into its own municipality during that era. The formation of the town system was seen to purposefully impact Lyari in a negative manner because administrative division were largely controlled by the MQM, whereas Lyari had been a bastion of the rival PPP.

Crime and violence emanating from Lyari began to take hold over much of Karachi in a manner that had not been seen in previous decades, when violence in Lyari was mostly confined to Lyari itself. 3,251 people were killed in Karachi by 2013.

=== Security operations and recent developments (2013–present) ===
In 2013, an anti-crime operation sought to pacify Lyari in which over 1,000 were apprehended. In 2014, the city was ranked the 6th most dangerous city in the world. After success of the operation, crime fell drastically in Karachi, and the city was ranked 93rd most dangerous in mid-2020. In 2018, Lyari voted for Imran Khan's Pakistan Tehreek-e-Insaf party, breaking a 48 year streak of PPP rule. After the PPP's defeat at the local level, the provincial government (which is still controlled by the PPP) began to invest in infrastructure improvements in a bid to regain loyalty to the PPP.

== Demography ==
The very first inhabitants of Lyari were Sindhi fishermen and Baloch nomads. Lyari is unique in Karachi for its high percentage of residents who are Balochi speakers. After Karachi was developed under British rule, large waves of Baloch migrants settled in the Lyari from Iranian Balochistan. Migration increased after some political unrest in parts of Iranian Balochistan in 1928. Baloch of Iranian descent today form the largest portion of Baloch in Lyari. Gujaratis and Kutchis are also heavily represented in Baghdadi and Shah Baig Line. There are several thousand members of the African-descended Sheedi people, locally called Makrani, though they have mostly integrated into the larger Baloch community. Those of Sheedi heritage, or partial Sheedi heritage, may in fact make up the majority of Balochi speakers in Lyari.

According to the 2023 census, 26.3% of the population speak Balochi, 25.0% speak Sindhi, 15.2% speak "other languages", 10.1% speak Urdu, 9.2% speak Pashto, and 8.2% speak Punjabi.

Lyari is mostly Sunni, although there are at least and estimated 50,000 Zikri members.

== Politics ==
Lyari has been an important site for social and labor activism since the colonial era. Lyari was also a base for anti-colonial movements, such as the Khilafat Movement, and the Reshmi Rumal Tehreek. Mahatma Gandhi is reported to have visited Lyari's Chakiwara Chowk during his struggle against the British. In the 1960s, Lyari was the main base for several leftist student organizations and Baloch nationalist organizations. It is sometimes referred to as the birthplace of Baloch nationalism.

The locality became the base from which socialist Zulfikar Ali Bhutto campaigned for Prime Minister in the 1970s, and remained a stronghold of Bhutto's PPP for decades afterwards, as opposed to the rest of the city which was dominated by other parties. In the 80s, Lyari became a center of resistance to dictator Zia-ul-Haq, and again against Pervez Musharraf in the 2000s. In 1987, Benazir Bhutto was elected to the national assembly from a seat in Lyari. The area was a stronghold of the PPP from 1970 until 2018, when Lyari voted for Imran Khan's Pakistan Tehreek-e-Insaf party, and the PPP came in third place.

== Education ==
The Educational and Training Institutes in Lyari Town:

- Benazir Bhutto Shaheed University, Lyari (BBSUL)
- Shaheed Mohtarma Benazir Bhutto Medical College (SMBBMC)
- Lyari Degree Government Science, Arts and Commerce Boys College
- Zulfiqar Ali Bhutto Boys College
- Rose Educational and Welfare Society
- Abdullah Haroon Science & Commerce Boys College
- Nusrat Bhutto Science & Commerce Girls College
- Lyari General Hospital Medical & Nursing Training Institute
- Government Poly Technical College Lyari
- S.M. Lyari Government Boys Secondary School
- Kiran Foundation, DCTO Campus
- Al Qadir School, Liyari

== Sports ==
Football and boxing are the most popular sports, and some of the most notable boxers and footballers in Pakistan have mostly emerged from Lyari.

The city of Lyari has played a large role in Pakistani football history. Notable players from Lyari include Abdul Ghafoor, nicknamed the "Pakistani Pelé" and "Black Pearl of Pakistan", Muhammad Umer, Turab Ali, Ali Nawaz Baloch, Maula Bakhsh, Murad Bakhsh, Qadir Bakhsh, Abdul Jabbar, Hussain Killer, Abdullah Rahi, Yousuf Sr., Yousuf Jr., Ghulam Sarwar Sr., Muhammad Tariq Hussain, among others. The Kakri Ground and People's Football Stadium, which is one of the major football stadiums in the country are located in the city.

The 1988 Summer Olympics in Seoul, South Korea bronze medal champion Hussein Shah was born and trained in Lyari, who won in the Middleweight division (71–75 kg). It was the country's first-ever Olympic boxing medal.

== In popular culture ==
The 2025 and 2026 Indian spy action thriller films Dhurandhar and Dhurandhar: The Revenge are based in the neighbourhoods of Lyari and the plot revolves around multiple locations in its vicinity.
