= Hawke's Bay Beach =

Beach in Karachi, Pakistan

- Beach
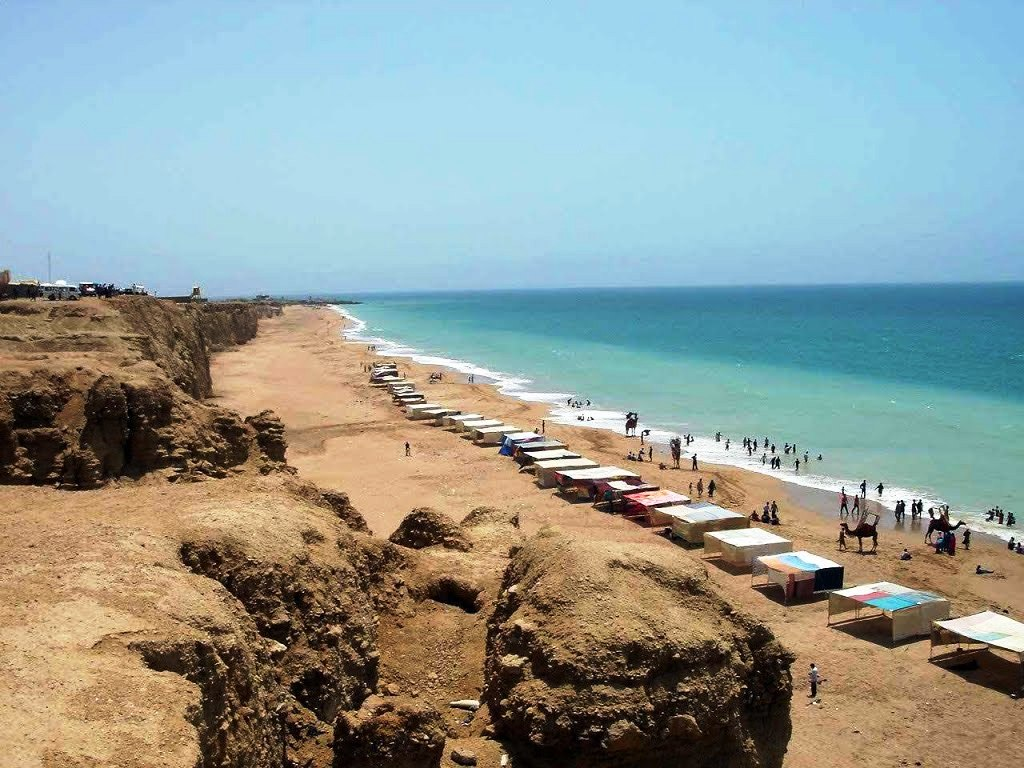
- A view over the beach

- Location within Sindh Location within Pakistan
- Coordinates: 24.860202°N 66.863654°E
- Location: Karachi, Pakistan
- Water bodies: Beach on Arabian Sea

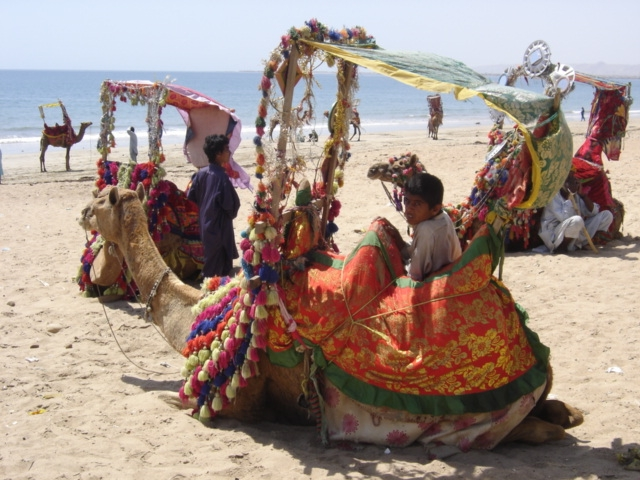
Camels in Hawks bay.

Hawke's Bay or Hawkesbay is a beach in Karachi, Sindh, Pakistan, located 20 kilometres (12 mi) southwest of Karachi city. The beach is named after Bladen Wilmer Hawke, who owned a house on the beach during the 1930s.

The beach is very popular, with hundreds of people visiting daily for swimming, camel and horse riding, and vacations.

== Marine life ==
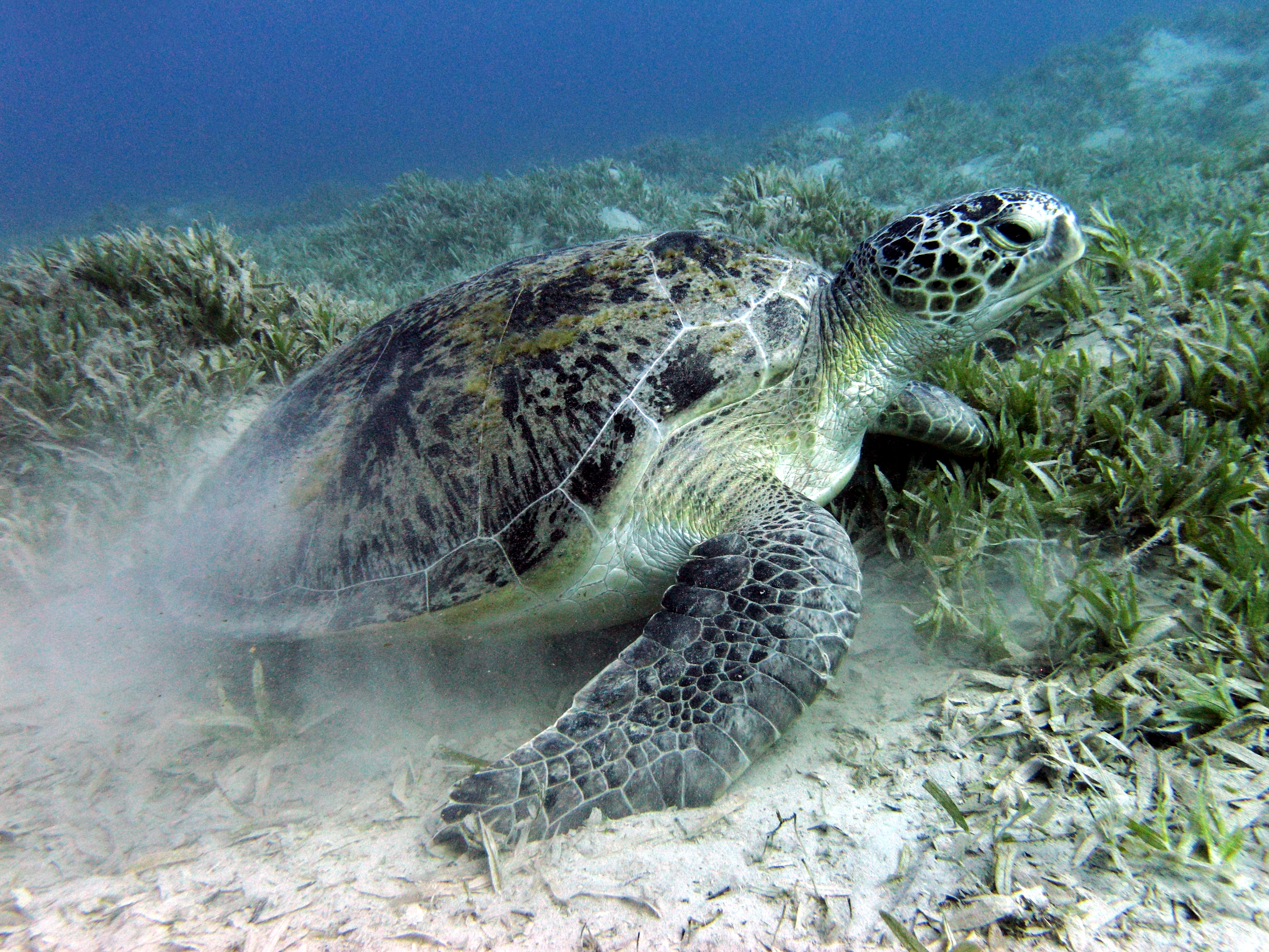
Endangered Green sea turtle

This beach is known for being a nesting ground for green sea turtle and olive ridley sea turtle during winter months. Due to this, the World Wide Fund for Nature (WWF) organised a wetland centre on the beach for information regarding turtles.

== Hawkes Bay incidents ==
Various accidents have occurred due to lack of proper security and damaged boats used for giving rides to people.

- In February 1983, a Shia pilgrim drowned near the beach.
- On July 19, 2015, four boys drowned near the beach.
- On September 9, 2017, 12 members of three families drowned near the beach.

== See also ==
- Hawke's Bay Town
- Mubarak Goth
