= Lyari Town =

Residential town within the city of Karachi, Pakistan

Lyari Town لیاری ٹاؤن
- Constituent Town of Karachi
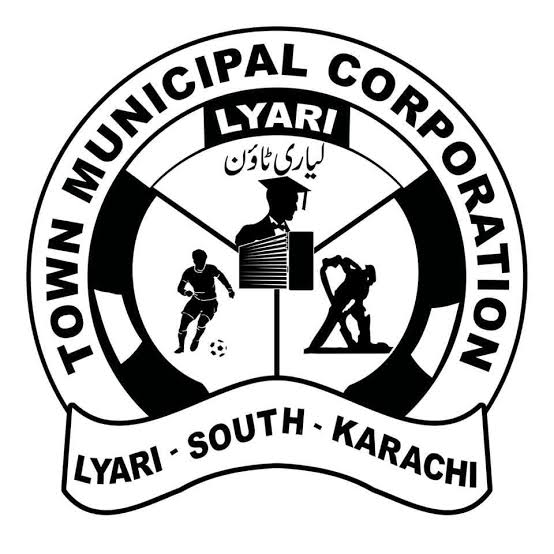
- Seal

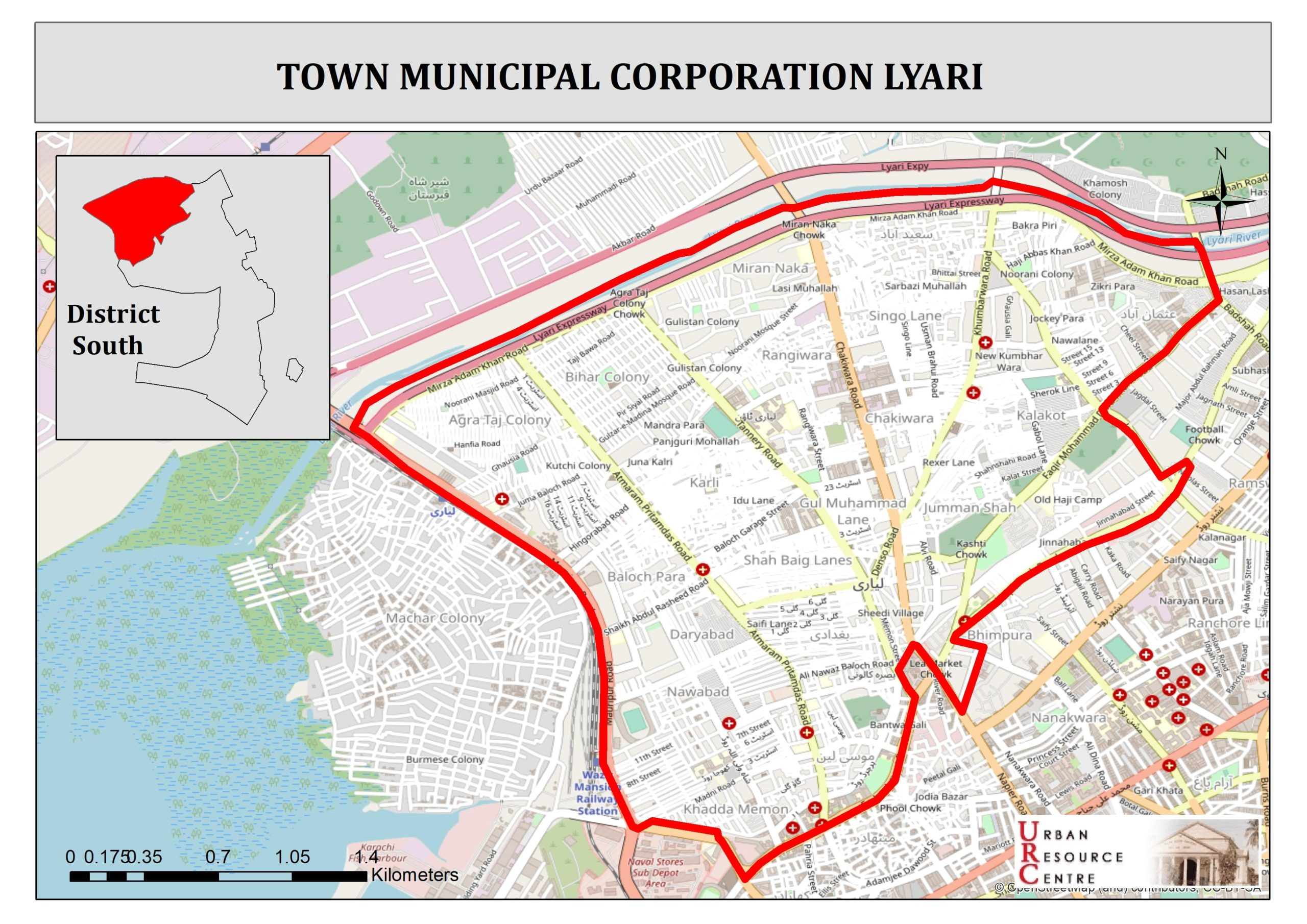
- Lyari Town Map
- Town Chairman: Khalil Hoath
- District: District Karachi South
- Division: Karachi Division
- Province: Sindh
- Country: Pakistan
- Established: 1972; 54 years ago
- Town status: 14 August 2001; 25 years ago
- Disbanded: 11 July 2011; 15 years ago
- Part of District Karachi West: (1972-2015)
- Union Committees in Town Municipal Corporation: 13: Agra Taj Colony Bihar Colony Gulistan Colony Singo Lane Nawa Lane Kalakot-Rexer Lane Ghulam Muhammad Lane-Rangiwara Kalri-Shah Baig Lane Daryabad-Hingorabad Khada Memon Society Nayabad Baghdadi Jinnahabad-Ghulam Shah Lane

Government
  - Type: Government of Karachi
  - Constituency: NA-239 Karachi South-I
  - National Assembly Member: Nabil Gabol

Area
  - Total: 6 km^{2} (2.3 sq mi)
- Elevation: 2 m (6.6 ft)
- Highest elevation: 19 m (62 ft)
- Lowest elevation: −2 m (−6.6 ft)

Population (2023 Pakistani census)
  - Total: 949,878
  - Density: 158,313/km^{2} (410,030/sq mi)
- Demonym: Karachiite
- Time zone: UTC+05:00 (PKT)
  - Summer (DST): DST is not observed
- ZIP Code: 75660
- NWD (area) code: 021
- ISO 3166 code: PK-SD

Lyari Town (Sindhi: لیاري ٽائون, Urdu: لیاری ٹاؤن; Balochi: شهرک لیاری) is named after the historic locality of Lyari. Lyari Town was the smallest borough (called "town" in Karachi) by area, but also the most densely populated. Lyari Town was formed in 2001 as part of the Local Government Ordinance 2001, and was subdivided into 11 union councils. The town system was disbanded in 2011, and Lyari Town was re-organized and merged into Karachi South in 2015 before it was part of District Karachi West. According to the 2023 Pakistani census, the population of Lyari Subdivision is 949,878.

== Town Municipal Committee ==
The Town Municipal Committee Lyari (TMC Lyari) is a local government body in Karachi, Pakistan, responsible for providing municipal services within its designated jurisdiction. It is one of the 26 Town Municipal Corporations established in Karachi under the Sindh Local Government Act, 2021.

The creation of the Town Municipal Committee Lyari is part of a restructuring of Karachi's local government system. The Sindh government replaced the previous seven District Municipal Corporations (DMCs) with 26 towns, each with its own municipal committee. Lyari Town is one of two towns located within the Karachi South District, alongside Saddar Town.

== Location ==
It was bordered by the boroughs of SITE Town to the north across the Lyari River, Jamshed Town and Saddar Town to the east, and Kemari Town to the west across Karachi Harbour.

== History ==
=== 2000 ===
The federal government introduced local government reforms in the year 2000, which eliminated the previous "third tier of government" (administrative divisions) and replaced it with the fourth tier (districts). The effect in Karachi was the dissolution of the former Karachi Division, and the merging of its five districts to form a new Karachi City-District with eighteen autonomous constituent towns including Lyari Town.

=== 2011 ===
In 2011, the system was disbanded but remained in place for bureaucratic administration until 2015, when the Karachi Metropolitan Corporation system was reintroduced.

=== 2015 ===
In 2015, Lyari Town was re-organized as part of Karachi South district.

== In popular culture ==
Lyari is depicted in the film Dhurandhar and its sequel, which draws inspiration from the Lyari gang wars and the area's history of political and criminal violence. The film uses Lyari as a backdrop for parts of its story, reflecting the influence of local gangs and the broader conflict that shaped the neighborhood during the late 2000s and early 2010s.

== Demographics ==
There are several ethnic groups in Lyari sub-division. Total population of Lyari sub-division is 949,878 as of 2023 Pakistani census.

The ethnic group in lyari town includes Balochs, Sindhis, Punjabis, Pashtuns, Muhajirs, Saraikis, Kashmiris, Hindkowans, Memons, Bohra, Kutchis and many more.

== See also ==
- Lyari Development Authority
- Lyari Expressway
- Lyari River
- Lyari
- Lyari Expressway Resettlement Project
