= Sensations (film) =

- Film Poster
- Directed by: Lasse Braun
- Written by: Véronique Monod; Ian Rakoff
- Produced by: Reuben Sturman
- Starring: Brigitte Maier; Véronique Monod; Helga Trixi; Frédérique Barral; Robert Le Ray; Tuppy Owens
- Distributed by: Pic America; Alpha Blue Archives; Caballero Home Video; Blue Video; General Video of America
- Release dates: May 11, 1975 (France); November 4, 1975 (New York City)
- Running time: 86 min.
- Countries: France, Netherlands
- Language: English
- Budget: $250,000 (estimated)

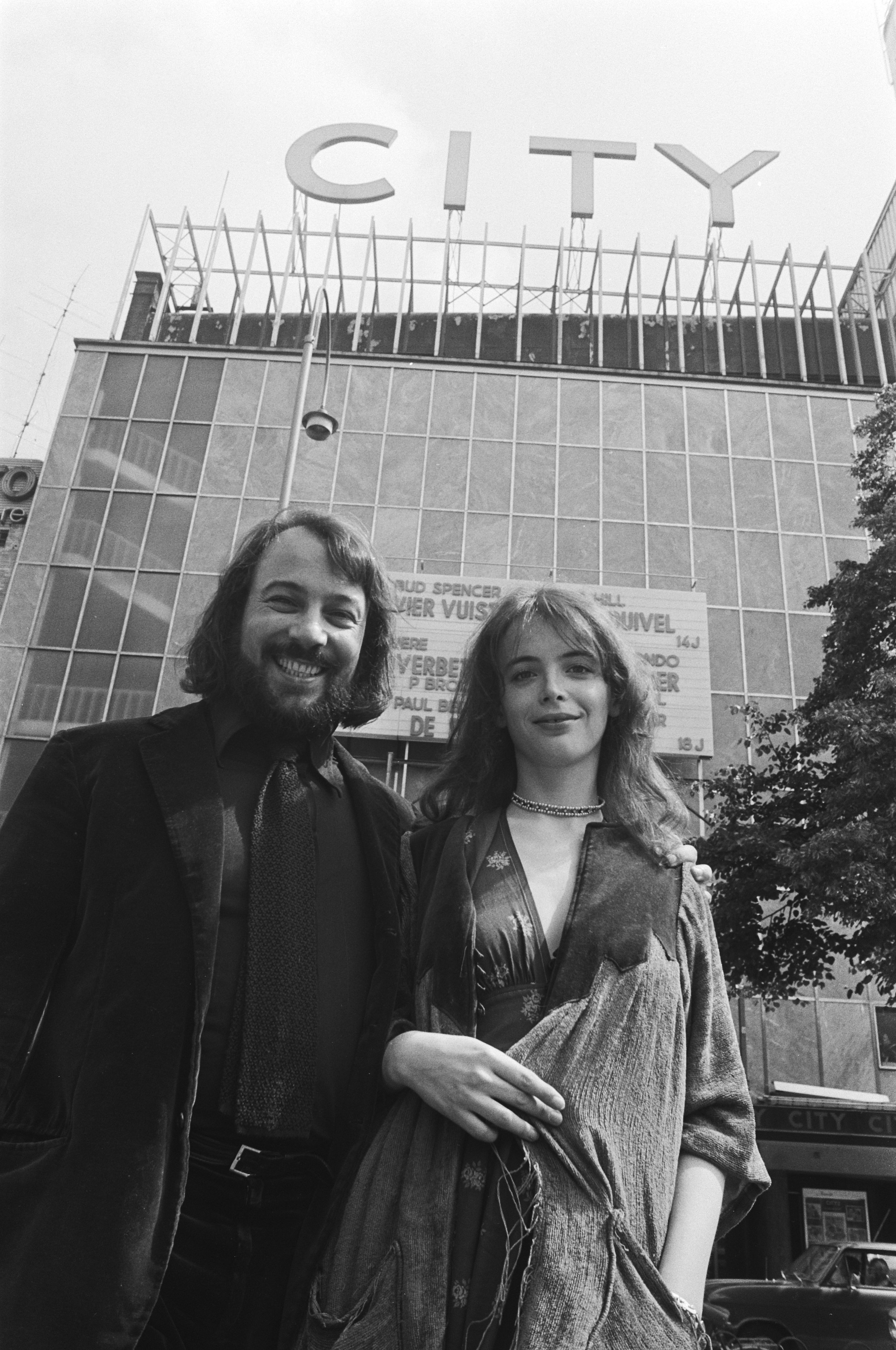
Lasse Braun and Brigitte Maier 1976

Sensations is a 1975 pornographic film written by Veronique Monod, directed by Lasse Braun, and starring the writer and Brigitte Maier. It also features an appearance by Tuppy Owens. Exhibited at the Cannes Film Festival, it became the first European pornographic film to be distributed in the United States.

== Premise ==
Maier and Monod play two girls who travel to Amsterdam looking for interesting sex.

== Cast ==
- Brigitte Maier as Margaret
- Véronique Monod as Véronique
- Helga Trixi as Trixie
- Frédérique Barral as Liza
- Robert Le Ray as Lord Weatherby
- Tuppy Owens as Lady Pamela
