= A. K. Jamil =

Pakistani anaesthetist

Dr. A. K. Jamil
- Born: 12 May 1939; Takht Bhai, Mardan District, Khyber Pakhtunkhwa, Pakistan
- Died: 23 June 2023 (aged 84)
- Education: Khyber Medical College
- Medical career
- Profession: Anesthetist
- Field: Anesthesiology

Ahmad Khan Jamil (Urdu/Pashto: احمد خان جمیل; 12 May 1939 – 25 June 2023) was a Pakistani anaesthetist who is credited for inventing a non-kink catheter mount used in anaesthesia, an improvement over conventional catheters. He has also devised a simple device for teaching controlled ventilation of lungs. The device is helpful for training young doctors on artificial ventilation during anaesthesia.

== Biography ==
=== Life and education ===
Dr. Ahmad Khan Jamil was born in Takht Bhai, Mardan District, Pakistan on 12 May 1939. His father Hakeem Fazal Ahad was a medical practitioner of Unani. He completed his MBBS degree from Khyber Medical College, Peshawar in 1965. In his earlier age he got himself involved in experiments and making things. In 1964, when he was a student, he wrote his first paper entitled 'Speculation about cancer'. He died on 25 June 2023.

=== Professional career ===
- 1965–1967 – As a Captain medical officer in Pakistan Army.
- 1967–1968 – Served as medical officer in the Lady Reading Hospital Peshawar.
- 1968–1972 – As a medical officer, National Health Service, England
- 1972–1975 – As Anaesthetist, National Health Service, England
- 1976–1980 – As medical officer and Anaesthetist, National Iranian Oil Company; Iran
- 1980 and Onward – Medical Practice, Pakistan

During his stay in England he found the opportunity and time to involve himself in research and developed a number of ideas, out of which he could fully evolve only a few for practical results.

=== Achievements ===
Apart from his services in his medical profession, Dr.A.K Jamil also paid attention to scientific research and inventions. For instance he invented the Non-kink catheter mount used in anaesthesia which was better than the standard catheters. Catheter mounts made of plain rubber tubing kink when bent, while those made of corrugated rubber tubing kinked when twisted. This causes a great deal of inconvenience during anaesthesia for neurosurgery and other operations performed on the head and neck. To overcome this difficulty, Dr.A.K Jamil (Anaesthetist, Manchester) designed the catheter mount which he named 'Non-kink catheter mount'. He also devised a simple device for teaching controlled ventilation of the patient's lungs. The device is helpful for training young doctors on artificial ventilation during anaesthesia. He also designed the Humeral Epicondyle Holder for use in orthopaedic surgery. Orthopedic surgeons experienced difficulty while holding the rather small and slimy distal fragment of the bone. The Humeral Epicondyle holder has therefore been designed to overcome this difficulty. Dr. Jamil designed the instrument in 1968 and submitted its details to The Bath Institute of Medical Engineering (BIME). U.K in 1969. The leading manufacturer – Downs Brothers Myre & Phelps Ltd.(Church path, Mitcham, Surrey, England) manufactured it in 1971. He also designed a simple device for blind tracheal intubation and paediatric endotracheal tube. (manufactured by Portex Ltd; Hythe, Kent, England). Besides medicine, his research involves physics, Engineering, electricity, magnetism and others. He wrote a book titled "Magnetic Vacuum and Magnetic High Pressure" in 1971 which has now become part of the British National Bibliography (BNB). Dr. Jamil Ahmad Khan published a book, The Art of Inventive & Creative Work. pp. 275, published 1994, his 30 years research from 1964 to 1994; ISBN 969-8260-00-5. Dr. Jamil also published a chart 'The Human History': Tree of Prophets (of Quran & Bible); & Table of some Arabic & Biblical names with Arabic & Biblical pronunciation. C Copyright Jamil, A.K. 2004, First Published 2005, ISBN 969-8260-01-3 Updated Chart of the above, ISBN 978-969-8260-02-6

=== Contributions ===
Besides his inventions, he wrote articles and books on medicine and others branches of science in various medical and other journals. Among these, the British Journal of Anaesthesia, Anaesthesia (journal) England, British National Bibliography England are the most prominent. Following is the list of his books and articles published in renowned medical and other journals.

1. Some basic requirement for emergencies and anaesthesia, and instructions for recovering unconscious patients.
2. Laryngotracheal toilet before extubation
3. The art of inventive and creative work.
4. Tone of skeletal muscles.
5. Magnetic vacuum and magnetic high pressure
6. Information on patient due for anaesthesia
7. Non-Kink Catheter Mount
8. A simple device for teaching controlled ventilation

=== Awards and honours ===
- Marquis Who's Who listed his name in its 9th, 10th and 11th Edition.
- International Biographical Centre, England listed his name and biography in 'Men of achievement' 14th edition; International Leader in Achievement, 2nd Edition; International Leader in Achievement, 21st Edition.
- Who's Who in Australia and the Far East, 2nd Edition
- Who's Who in Australia and the Far East, 4th Edition
- During the Indo-Pakistani War of 1965, he was awarded the Tamgha-e-Jang by the Pakistan Army.

== See also ==
- List of Pakistani inventions and discoveries
- Instruments used in anesthesiology
