= Tahawwur Hussain Rana =

Pakistani-Canadian islamist militant and former military doctor (born 1961)

- Born: 12 January 1961 (age 65); Chichawatni, Punjab, Pakistan
- Occupations: Pakistan Army; Former Doctor for the Pakistan Army Medical Corps (Captain); Businessman; Member of Lashkar-e-Taiba
- Known for: 2008 Mumbai attacks
- Status: Extradited to India
- Motive: Islamic Terrorism
- Convictions: Conspiracy to provide material support to terrorists in Denmark (18 U.S.C. § 2339A); Providing material support to a designated foreign terrorist organization (18 U.S.C. § 2339B)
- Penalty: 14 years imprisonment
- Capture status: In Custody with the National Investigation Agency

Tahawwur Hussain Rana (Urdu: تہوّر حسین رانا) (born 12 January 1961) is a Pakistani-Canadian terrorist, businessman and former military doctor, who is known for his involvement in terrorism-related activities. He was a member of the militant group Lashkar-e-Taiba and was implicated in several high-profile terrorist plots, including the 2008 Mumbai attacks in India and a foiled attack on the Danish newspaper Jyllands-Posten in 2009.

Born and raised in Pakistan, Rana completed medical school before serving as a doctor in the Pakistan Army, where he had the rank of Captain. In the late 1990s, he deserted from the Army and emigrated to Canada.

After obtaining Canadian citizenship, he migrated to the United States and settled in Chicago, Illinois. There he operated various businesses, including an immigration consultancy.

In October 2009, Rana was arrested in the US in connection with his involvement in the 2008 Mumbai attacks, which killed over 160 people. He was also linked to an attempted attack on the Jyllands-Posten in Denmark, which had published controversial cartoons of the Islamic prophet Muhammad. Rana was charged with 12 offences, among them aiding and abetting in the killing of American citizens. Although Rana was acquitted by a U.S. court of direct participation in the Mumbai attacks, he was convicted of providing material support for terrorism, including helping his co-conspirator David Headley plan both the Mumbai and Copenhagen attacks. In 2013 Rana was sentenced to 14 years in prison. Rana and Headley were given a trial in absentia in a Bombay High Court for their involvement in the 2008 Mumbai attacks. Indian authorities actively sought extradition for both men.

Rana’s case garnered international attention due to his connections to global terrorism networks and his military service that preceded his extremist activities. In 2023, the Supreme Court of the United States approved his extradition to India, a decision confirmed by President Donald Trump in February 2025.

Rana was extradited to India by the United States on 9 April 2025. After arriving in India, Rana was sent into custody with the NIA.

== Early life and professional career ==
Tahawwur Hussain Rana was born on 12 January 1961, in Chichawatni, Punjab into a Rajput family, Pakistan. He graduated from Cadet College Hasan Abdal, where he developed a close friendship with American co-conspirator David Headley. Rana pursued a career in medicine and served as a captain general duty practitioner in the Pakistan Army Medical Corps. After desertion from the Army, Rana immigrated to Canada with his wife in 1997. Both he and his wife, who is also a doctor, obtained Canadian citizenship in June 2001, becoming naturalized Canadians.

Upon settling in Chicago, Rana became involved in various business ventures. He established several businesses, including First World Immigration Services, an immigration service agency with offices in Chicago, New York, and Toronto. He also founded a halal slaughterhouse that specializes in slaughtering goats, sheep, and cows in accordance with Islamic laws. Rana’s family lives in a modest home on Chicago's North Side, easily identifiable by the large satellite dish on its roof. Neighbours describe him as a reclusive figure who rarely interacts with others, and his children are noted for not socialising with local children.

In addition to his business ventures, Rana owns a home in Ottawa, where his father and brother reside. His father was a high school principal near Lahore. The family is known for its notable accomplishments: one of Rana's cousins is a retired Pakistani military psychiatrist and author, while another is a journalist for The Hill Times, a twice-weekly Canadian political newspaper and political website.

== Charges of terrorism ==
Rana, a former Pakistani military officer, was implicated in a high-profile international terrorism investigation connected to a planned attack on the offices of Jyllands-Posten, a Danish newspaper. The plot, orchestrated in collaboration with David Coleman Headley, targeted the newspaper's employees in retaliation for its 2005 publication of cartoons depicting Muhammad which had sparked widespread outrage among Muslims. This attack was part of a broader effort to retaliate against the publication for what many viewed as an affront to Islam.

The case involving Rana is considered one of the earliest instances where U.S. federal authorities directly linked a former Pakistani military officer to a terrorism-related plot, marking a significant development in counterterrorism investigations. Although U.S. intelligence agencies had long suspected connections between extremists and elements of the Pakistani military, the Rana-Headley conspiracy highlighted a more direct involvement of military personnel in global terrorism. There had been prior suspicions that some members of the Pakistani military and intelligence services had tacitly encouraged or facilitated attacks on perceived enemies of Pakistan, particularly those targeting India.

In addition to his role in the planned attack in Copenhagen, Rana was also sought by Indian authorities for his involvement in the 2008 Mumbai attacks, a series of coordinated terrorist assaults in which over 160 people were killed. Indian officials confirmed that both Headley and Rana had visited Mumbai and other cities in India months before the attacks, with speculation suggesting that they may have scouted potential targets or gathered intelligence on the sites that were later attacked. Investigators in India had long suspected that the Mumbai assault was not solely planned by Lashkar-e-Taiba, the Pakistan-based militant group responsible for the attack, but involved external support from other individuals, including Rana and Headley.

Following the attacks on 26 November 2008, Rana reportedly congratulated the group behind the assault. In communications with Headley, he instructed his co-conspirator to pass along his congratulations to the terror group for their excellent planning and preparation. This statement further underscored Rana's complicity in the events surrounding the Mumbai massacre and his support for the militant group’s activities.

On 18 October 2009, both Rana and Headley were arrested at O'Hare International Airport in Chicago on multiple terrorism-related charges. These charges stemmed from their involvement in both the 2008 Mumbai attacks and the planned attack on Jyllands-Posten in Copenhagen. During the subsequent interrogation of Rana, federal prosecutors uncovered significant details about his role in the planning of the attacks. It was revealed that Rana had traveled to Mumbai before the attacks and had stayed at the Taj Mahal Palace & Tower, one of the primary locations targeted by Lashkar-e-Taiba during the coordinated assault. While federal investigators linked this visit to the attacks, Rana maintained that his trip to the Taj Mahal Palace & Tower had been for a different purpose. He claimed that he had visited the hotel with his wife as part of his immigration consultancy business, where he conducted interviews with people wishing to emigrate to Canada or the U.S. This claim was part of his defense, although it did little to alleviate suspicion about his involvement in the planning of the attacks.

Rana, who owned an immigration law office and a butcher shop on Devon Avenue in Chicago, was implicated in the 2008 Mumbai attacks due to his assistance to David Coleman Headley in scouting locations for the assault. Rana, who ran First World Immigration Services, helped Headley carry out various activities in both India and Denmark, knowing about the attacks in advance.

Headley, who later pleaded guilty to multiple charges, relied on Rana to falsify immigration documents, which facilitated Headley’s movements between countries. Rana’s immigration office provided cover for Headley’s operations. As part of his cover, Headley even opened a branch of Rana's law office in Mumbai. Headley pretended that he was interested in placing an ad for legal services in the Danish newspaper Jyllands-Posten, which had published controversial cartoons of Muhammad, a motive for the planned attack in Copenhagen. This false pretext was intended to hide Headley’s true purpose as he scouted locations for future terrorist activities. The government presented evidence that Rana acted as a conduit, passing messages between Headley and one of his Pakistan-based operatives. In addition, Headley gave Rana a video produced by Al-Qaeda, which took responsibility for an attack on the Danish Embassy in Pakistan. This video further tied Rana to the extremist activities and bolstered the case that he played a significant role in supporting and facilitating Headley’s operations. These actions, which spanned multiple countries and involved the manipulation of legal and immigration channels, highlighted the extent to which Rana was involved in aiding Headley and the terrorist network behind the attacks in Mumbai and Copenhagen.

In his defence, Rana argued that he had agreed to support Headley’s activities in India because he was led to believe that he was working for the Inter-Services Intelligence (ISI), thus under the direction of the Pakistani government. He contended that his support for Headley’s operations was provided under the assumption that he was acting in accordance with the interests of the Pakistani state, rather than as part of a terrorist conspiracy. This defense sought to distance him from the more sinister elements of the plot, presenting his involvement as unwitting and guided by the belief that he was working with an official government entity. Rana's family insisted on his innocence, claiming he is a pacifist who was framed by Headley. In April 2025, after Rana's extradition was approved, the U.S. Department of Justice reportedly stated that after the Mumbai attacks, in an "intercepted communication", he allegedly told Headley the Indians "deserved it" and praised the slain Lashkar-e-Taiba attackers, saying they should receive Pakistan’s highest military honour, the Nishan-e-Haider.

Rana's background as a graduate of Pakistan’s prestigious military academy in Hasan Abdal was significant in understanding his connections within military circles. Along with Headley, he maintained communication with other alumni of the academy, including military officers, who were part of a network that referred to themselves as the "Abdalians." This group, which communicated through internet postings, played a role in facilitating Rana’s activities and expanding his connections within Pakistan’s military establishment, as documented in government affidavits. Many of the email messages between them, which portrayed beheadings and suicide bombings as acts of heroism, were presented as part of the evidence in the case against both Rana and Headley

Rana and Headley were reported to have been in contact with Ilyas Kashmiri, a former Pakistani military officer turned militant commander. Kashmiri had become a notable figure in global terrorism, with ties to both Al-Qaeda and Lashkar-e-Taiba. He was also a leader of Harakat-ul-Jihad-Islami (HuJI), a Pakistani-based terrorist group known for its involvement in various militant activities, including attacks in Afghanistan and India. His leadership within multiple extremist organizations underscored the increasingly complex web of affiliations that facilitated global terrorism. Kashmiri's connections with both Rana and Headley further illustrated the growing collaboration between former military personnel and militant groups, adding another layer of complexity to international terrorism networks.

Rana and Headley distinguished themselves from the typical profile of young, impoverished extremists educated in fundamentalist Islamic schools, who often target locations within or near their homelands. Instead, their privileged upbringings, extensive international travel, and experiences of cultural dissonance aligned them more closely with figures like Khalid Sheikh Mohammed, the self-proclaimed mastermind behind the September 11 attacks, who pursued higher education in the United States, and Mohamed Atta, one of the lead hijackers. The case involving Rana and Headley was also seen as emblematic of a new and evolving trend in terrorism. American military and intelligence officials noted that the plot was not the work of established terrorist organizations, but rather a collaboration between individual militants with diverse backgrounds. This shift signified a departure from traditional group-based terrorist activities, with militants from different spheres joining forces to plan and execute attacks, making counterterrorism efforts more complex and challenging for authorities worldwide.

The United States District Court for the Northern District of Illinois found Rana not guilty of involvement in the 2008 Mumbai attacks but he was subsequently sentenced to 14 years of imprisonment on other charges on 17 January 2013. The verdict was met with disappointment by the Indian National Investigation Agency. Rana and Headley were tried in absentia in Bombay High Court for their involvement in the 2008 Mumbai attacks. Indian authorities actively sought extradition for both. In 2011, Tahawwur Hussain Rana was found guilty by the Indian courts for supporting an militant group responsible for the 2008 Mumbai attacks. Despite denying the charges, he challenged India's request to extradite him, which was supported by the US government. However, the court approved the extradition since Rana faced charges in India for criminal conspiracy, terrorism, and murder, all of which are covered by the US-India extradition agreement.In the same year, a federal court in Chicago convicted Rana for providing support to Lashkar-e-Taiba (LeT), an extremist group, and for his involvement in a failed plot against a Danish newspaper. However, he was cleared of any direct connection to the Mumbai attacks. In 2013, Rana was sentenced to 14 years in prison for these crimes. In 2020, he was released from prison in the US on compassionate grounds after contracting COVID-19. Later that year, he was arrested again after India renewed its request for his extradition. In May 2023, the Supreme Court of the United States approved Rana's extradition to India, which was confirmed by President Donald Trump on 13 February 2025.

== Extradition and custody of National Investigation Agency ==
On 8 April 2025, after Rana's last plea to stop his extradition was rejected by the Supreme Court of the United States, a team of National Investigation Agency officers arrived in the United States to take Rana into custody. The plane carrying Rana reached the Palam Air base in New Delhi on 10 April 2025. He was immediately sent to an 18-day NIA custody by a special NIA court in Delhi.

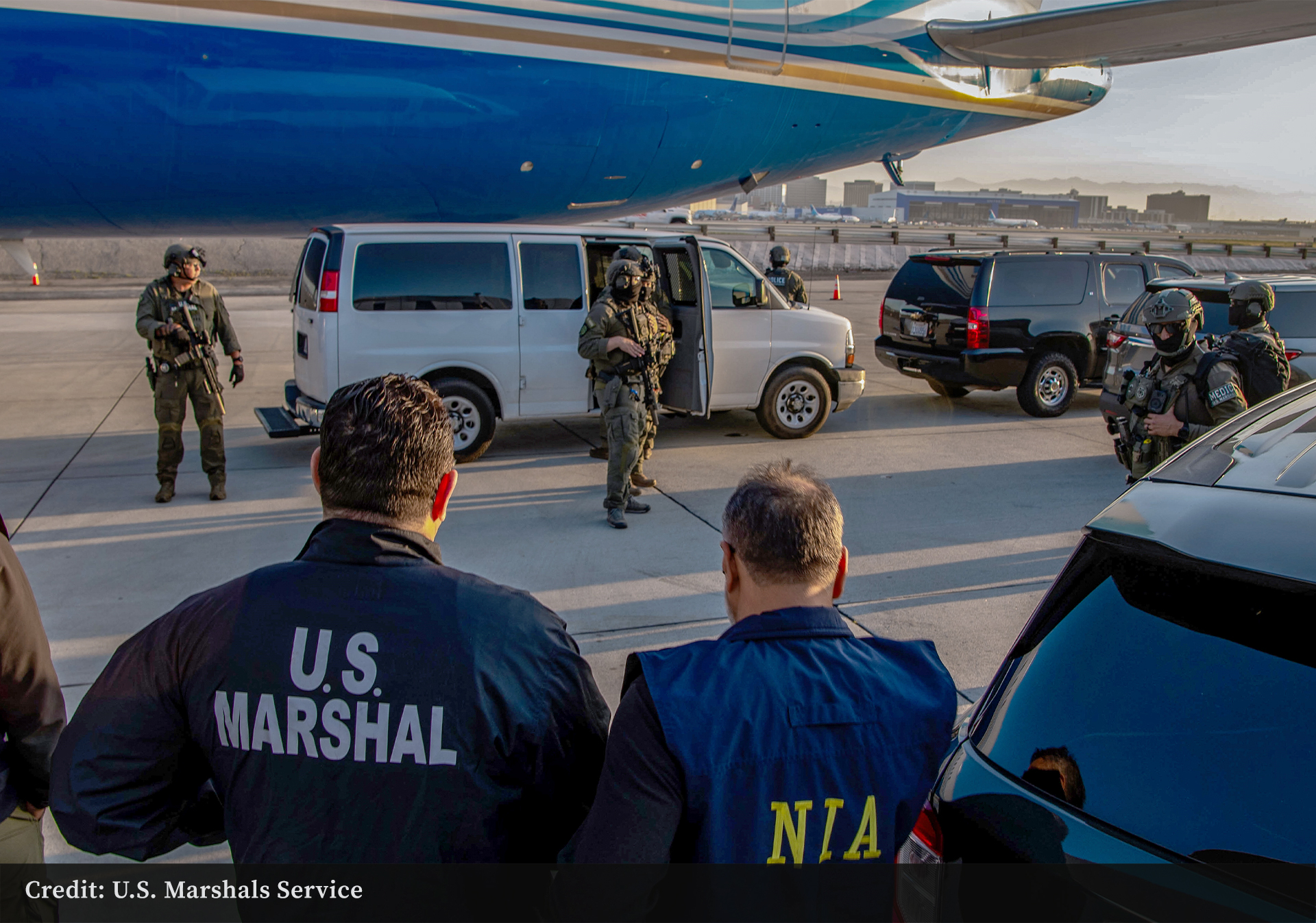
United States Marshals Service with NIA officials during the extradition of Tahawwur in USA.

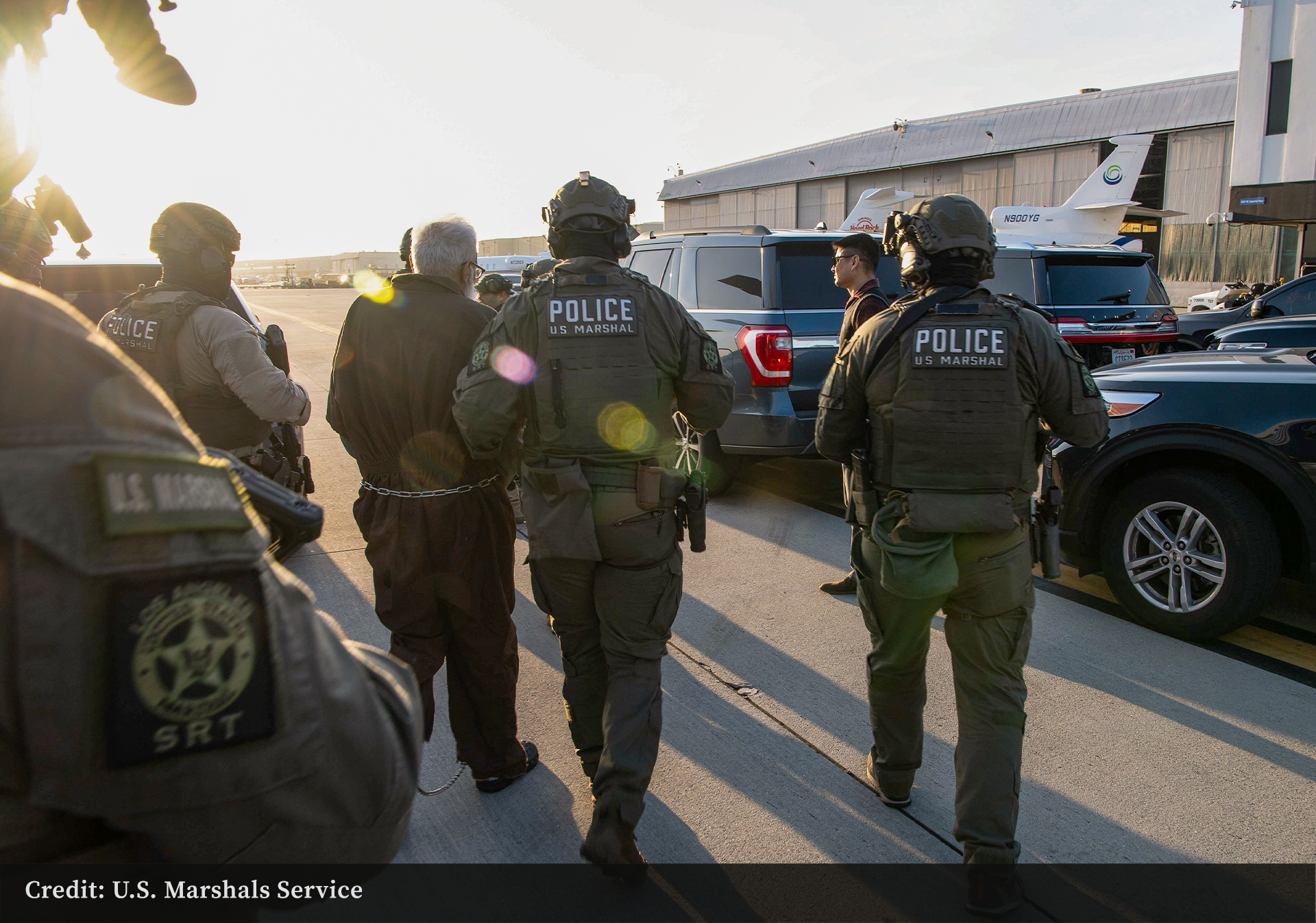
U.S. Marshals Service executed the Secretary’s surrender warrant by surrendering Rana to Indian authorities for transportation to India.

== Canadian citizenship loss ==
On 23 February 2026, the Government of Canada stated that it would revoke Rana's Canadian citizenship. The reason was not attributed to charges of terrorism, but that Rana had falsely declared to have lived in Ottawa and Toronto for 4 years before applying for Canadian citizenship in the year 2000. The RCMP had investigated that Rana spent nearly all that time in Chicago, where he owned several businesses and properties.
