= Babar Sattar =

Justice of the Islamabad High Court

- بابر ستار

Justice of the Peshawar High Court
- Incumbent
- Assumed office 30 April 2026

Justice of the Islamabad High Court
- In office 30 December 2020 – 29 April 2026

Personal details
- Born: 15 February 1976 (age 50)
- Education: Cadet College Hasan Abdal; Harvard Law School (LL.M.)

Babar Sattar (Urdu: بابر ستار) (born 15 February 1976) serves as a Pakistani jurist and has held the position of Justice at the Islamabad High Court (IHC) from 30 December 2020 to 29 April 2026 President of Pakistan transferred him from Islamabad High Court to Peshawar High Court on recommendations of Judicial Commission of Pakistan on 29 April 2026.

== Education ==
He is a graduate of Cadet College Hasan Abdal. Sattar, a Rhodes Scholar, pursued his Master of Laws (LL.M.) at Harvard Law School.

== Career ==
Before joining the judiciary, he had a diverse background as a lawyer, law professor, and regular contributor to various platforms, including Medium, Dawn, The News International, Geo News, and The Friday Times.

He received the recommendation for the position of Additional Judge from the Judicial Commission of Pakistan (JCP), led by then Chief Justice of Pakistan Gulzar Ahmed, on 3 December 2020.

The President of Pakistan, Arif Alvi, approved his appointment as an additional judge on 30 December 2020.

On 8 December 2021, the JCP endorsed his promotion to the permanent judge position at the IHC.

== Cases ==
In 2019, he served as the advocate for Qazi Faez Isa before a full bench of the Supreme Court of Pakistan, handling a case where Isa contested a presidential reference filed against him in the Judicial Commission of Pakistan.

On 1 March 2022, in a legal matter, Sattar declared marriages under the age of 18 unlawful, issuing directives to reunite a 16-year-old girl with her mother in a case involving early marriage.

On 13 November 2022, he suspended an FIR against a citizen who posted tweets against then Chief of Army Staff Qamar Javed Bajwa, asserting that mere tweets cannot incite mutiny in the army.

On 17 August 2023, he ordered the release of Pakistan Tehreek-e-Insaf (PTI) leaders Shehryar Afridi and Shandana Gulzar, also deciding to indict the deputy commissioner, Irfan Nawaz Memon, and SSP Islamabad, Jamil Zafar, for not complying with previous orders in the same matter, leading to contempt of the court charges. He also stripped away the powers of arbitrary detention of a suspect, under section 3 of Maintenance of Public Order (3-MPO), from the deputy commissioner. In a hearing on 29 September 2023, Sattar rejected the unconditional apology of Memon, and asked him to prepare for his defense. The judge also chastised Memon for trying to approach him through friends and family. In another hearing on 12 December 2023, Sattar decided to proceed against Memon and others indicted on a day-to-day basis. He once again rejected the unconditional apologies rendered by Memon while remarking that contempt of court involves a "six-month sentence wherein you may also live in jail and see how those who you sent to jail live there."

He participated in the IHC bench that addressed the contempt of court case involving former Prime Minister of Pakistan Imran Khan. This was in response to remarks characterized as misogynistic and threatening directed at female Additional Sessions Judge Zeba Chaudhry.

On 22 September 2023, he issued a contempt of court notice to Raziq Sanjrani, brother of Sadiq Sanjrani, Chairman of the Senate of Pakistan, for not appearing before the court in a case related to the illegal allotment of a house in Islamabad to Raziq Sanjrani.

On 7 December 2023, he directed the Inter-Services Intelligence chief Nadeem Anjum to submit a report on the alleged leaked audio of a call between former Prime Minister Imran Khan's wife Bushra Bibi and her lawyer Latif Khosa.

On 29 December 2023, he delivered a reserved verdict in the case regarding the arrest of Shehryar Afridi and Shandana Gulzar, declaring the deputy commissioner's authority to issue detention orders under Section 3 of the MPO (Maintenance of Public Order) illegal, transferring that authority to the federal cabinet.

== Views ==
He holds a critical stance against the practice of audio recordings by Pakistani intelligence agencies involving public officials. In various hearings, he has posed the question "who records these audios?" However, some critics argue that his actions might be perceived as shielding individuals linked to corruption and criminal activities. An example cited is the case involving the son of former Chief Justice of Pakistan Saqib Nisar, who was recorded allegedly seeking money on behalf of his father in exchange for offering PTI tickets to potential election candidates.

== Letter alleging ISI interference ==
=== Allegations of harassment by intelligence agencies ===
On 26 March 2024, six judges of the Islamabad High Court, including Sattar, wrote a letter to the Supreme Judicial Council of Pakistan, alleging interference by the Inter-Services Intelligence in judicial matters. They cited instances of pressure on judges through the abduction and torture of their relatives and secret surveillance within their residences. Additionally, they questioned the existence of a state policy aimed at intimidating and coercing judges. Subsequently, the next day, Chief Justice of Pakistan (CJP) Qazi Faez Isa convened a full court session to investigate the accusations raised by the judges.

== Bibliography ==
- Pamela Constable (2011), Playing with Fire: Pakistan at War with Itself, Random House Publishing Group, p. 213, ISBN 978-0-67-960345-0
