= David Headley =

American terrorist (born 1960)

David Coleman Headley
- Born: Dawood Sayed Gilani; June 30, 1960 (age 66); Washington, D.C., U.S.
- Occupations: Video store proprietor DEA informant Member of Lashkar-e-Taiba; Asset of Harkat-ul-Jihad-Al-Islami
- Spouse: Shazia Headley
- Children: 4
- Parent(s): Sayed Salim Gilani (father); Alice Serrill Headley (mother)
- Status: Imprisoned
- Convictions: Conspiracy to bomb places of public use in India (18 U.S.C. § 2332f); Conspiracy to murder and maim in India (18 U.S.C. § 956); Murder of United States nationals abroad (18 U.S.C. § 2332(a)(1) (6 counts); Conspiracy to provide material support to foreign terrorists in India and Pakistan (18 U.S.C. §§ 2339A and 2339B); Conspiracy to murder and maim in Denmark (18 U.S.C. § 956); Conspiracy to provide material support to terrorists in Denmark (18 U.S.C. § 2339A); Providing material support to a designated foreign terrorist organization (18 U.S.C. § 2339B)
- Penalty: 35 years federal prison 5 years supervised release

David Coleman Headley (born Dawood Sayed Gilani; June 30, 1960) is a Pakistani American convicted terrorist who was the mastermind behind the 2008 Mumbai attacks and Copanhagen plot. With the Pakistan-based terrorist organization Lashkar-e-Taiba (LeT) and Pakistan's foreign intelligence agency, the ISI, Headley conducted extensive surveillance and reconnaissance missions throughout central Mumbai, providing critical information to facilitate planning and executing the attacks. Additionally, he, along with his accomplice Tahawwur Hussain Rana, was involved in an unsuccessful plot to carry out an attack in Copenhagen, targeting the Danish newspaper Jyllands-Posten. For both of these crimes, Headley was convicted of 12 counts of terrorism and sentenced to 35 years in prison.

Born in Washington D.C., as an adult Headley became involved with drugs and trafficking. He was recruited as a U.S. Drug Enforcement Administration (DEA) informant as part of his plea deal following conviction for multiple heroin-related offenses, including attempting to smuggle narcotics into the U.S. from Pakistan. After being placed on probation, he made frequent unauthorized visits to Pakistan. There he became involved in the local jihad movement through his introduction to Lashkar-e-Taiba (LeT). Under the direction of LeT representatives, Headley performed five surveillance missions in Mumbai to scout targets for the 2008 Mumbai attacks. The following year, he performed a similar mission in Copenhagen to help plot an attack against the Danish newspaper Jyllands-Posten, which had published cartoons of Muhammad. Headley was arrested on October 3,2009 at O'Hare International Airport in Chicago with co-conspirator Tahawwur Hussain Rana while on his way to Pakistan. On January 24, 2013, a U.S. federal court sentenced Headley to 35 years in prison for his role in Mumbai and Copenhagen.

In India, a Mumbai special court held a trial in absentia for Headley in early February 2016, via a video link from his prison cell in the United States.

== Early life ==
David Coleman Headley was born Dawood Sayed Gilani on June 30, 1960, in Washington, D.C., to a Pakistani father and an American mother. His father Sayed Salim Gilani was a well-known Pakistani diplomat and broadcaster, while his mother Alice Serrill Headley worked as a secretary at the Pakistani embassy in Washington D.C., and hailed from Bryn Mawr, Pennsylvania. Headley has a younger sister, Syedah, and a half-brother, Danyal. Danyal became the spokesman for Pakistani Prime Minister Yousaf Raza Gillani and served as Pakistan's press attaché in Beijing.

Shortly after Headley was born, his family left the United States and settled in Lahore, Pakistan. Headley stood out because of his light skin color and the heterochromic coloration of his eyes. Headley's mother was unable to adapt to Pakistani culture and returned to the U.S. Due to Pakistani custody rules, she was forced to leave her children with their father in Lahore. After getting a divorce, she went through four more marriages and spent time in Southeast Asia and Afghanistan.

Headley was raised in a political environment steeped in Pakistani nationalism and Islamic conservatism, both of which were amplified by Pakistani tensions with India. During the Indo-Pakistani War of 1971, bombs hit Headley's elementary school in Karachi and killed two people. Headley went on to attend the elite Cadet College Hasan Abdal, a boys' international military prep school; while there, he befriended co-conspirator Tahawwur Hussain Rana.

In 1977, at the age of seventeen Headley left Pakistan following a difficult relationship with his Pakistani stepmother, and moved in with his biological mother in Philadelphia, where he helped her manage pubs such as the Khyber Pass Pub and the adjacent Miss Headley's Wine Bar. Employees at the pub nicknamed him "The Prince." Headley enrolled at Valley Forge Military Academy but dropped out after one semester. He was a student at the Community College of Philadelphia but dropped out without a degree in the 1990s. In 1985, he married a Pennsylvania State University student, but they divorced two years later due his ideological hostility. He eventually moved to New York City and opened a video rental business in Manhattan.

=== Drug Convictions and DEA Deal ===
During his frequent trips to Pakistan, Headley associated himself with heroin users and started using the drug himself. He became involved in Pakistani drug trafficking. When he was twenty-four, Headley smuggled half a kilogram of heroin out of Pakistani tribal areas and used Tahawwur Hussain Rana, a Pakistani army doctor who Headley knew from military school, as an unwitting shield. Several days later, police in Lahore arrested Headley for drug possession, but he was released. Rana continued to be used by Headley over the course of his career as a drug trafficker; in the late 1990s, after Rana had emigrated to the U.S., Headley used Rana's legitimate immigration consulting company in Chicago to smuggle drugs.

In 1988, while he was traveling to Philadelphia from Pakistan, Headley was arrested by police in Frankfurt, West Germany after two kilos of heroin were found hidden in a false bottom in his suitcase. Headley quickly made a plea deal when his case was handed over to the U.S. Drug Enforcement Administration, agreeing to surrender his partners in Philadelphia in exchange for a lighter sentence. Headley's cooperation earned him four years in prison while his two associates were sentenced to eight and ten years. At his sentencing hearing, the judge made the following statement: "It's up to you, Mr. [Headley], to do what you can with the rest of your life. You are still a young man. You can either take advantage of this opportunity. Your mother, your lawyer, people said some nice things about you, but what you did, not only to yourself, but to perhaps thousands, hundreds of victims, heroin users in this country is a terrible thing."

Headley managed to overcome his addiction to heroin, but was still involved in the drug trade. In early 1997, Headley was arrested with another man in a DEA sting operation when he tried to smuggle heroin into the country from Pakistan. Headley quickly offered his services as a confidential informant to the DEA. In January 1998, the agency sent him to Pakistan to dispel suspicions amongst his partners about his prior absence, and to gain intelligence on the country's heroin trafficking networks. According to the DEA, Headley's participation led to five arrests and the seizure of 2½ kilos of heroin. The DEA has insisted that Headley's 1998 trip to Pakistan was the only one paid for by the agency.

While the DEA seemingly made great gains from Headley's intelligence, there is ample evidence that Headley abused his status as an informant. He allegedly tried to set up heroin dealers with jailhouse phone calls that were not monitored by DEA agents. A mentally impaired Pakistani immigrant, Ikram Haq, was found to have been tricked into making a drug deal by Headley, and was subsequently acquitted on the grounds of entrapment when brought to trial. Despite this result, Headley was released from prison and put on probation for his contribution to the case. One anonymous former associate of Headley later suggested that he was exploiting his rapport with the DEA, saying, "The DEA agents liked him. He would brag about it. He was manipulating them. He said he had them in his pocket."

== Involvement in terrorism ==
In exchange for information about Pakistani drug contacts, Headley received a considerably lighter sentence than his co-defendant from the 1997 arrest: fifteen months in jail and five years of supervised release. In November 1998, he was delivered to the low-security Federal Correctional Institution, Fort Dix. There, he became an increasingly devout Muslim. In July 1999, only months into Headley's sentence, his attorney, Howard Leader, requested permission for him to be given a supervised early release from prison so he could travel to Pakistan to be wed in an arranged marriage. Judge Carol Amon granted the unusual request. Headley married a Pakistani woman named Shazia and fathered two children with her.

While visiting Lahore, Headley was introduced to Lashkar-e-Taiba (LeT), a terrorist organization. Headley made further trips to Pakistan without the knowledge of U.S. authorities, immersing himself in LeT ideology. He befriended LeT's spiritual leader, Hafiz Muhammad Saeed, and committed himself to the group's struggle against India, which was supported by the Directorate for Pakistan's Inter-Services Intelligence (ISI)

At the same time this was happening, Headley resumed work as a DEA informant in New York City and participated in an undercover operation that reportedly led to the seizure of one kilo of heroin. Despite working for a U.S. government agency, Headley actively raised money and recruited new members for LeT, a group that swore allegiance with Al-Qaeda. Headley would later testify that he discussed his views regarding Kashmir—the focus of LeT's terrorist activities—with his DEA handlers. The DEA has insisted that it was unaware of Headley's political and religious radicalization.

=== Post-9/11 activities ===
A day after the attacks on September 11, 2001, Headley's DEA handlers tasked him with collecting counter-intelligence on terrorists through his sources in the drug trade. However, a New York City bartender named Terry O'Donnell reported Headley to an FBI task force after Headley's ex-girlfriend told him that Headley had praised the 9/11 hijackers and "got off on watching the news over and over again" in the weeks following the attacks. Under questioning by two Defense Department agents, in the presence of his DEA handlers, Headley denied the accusations and cited his work for the DEA as proof of his loyalty to the U.S. Headley was cleared, and the DEA did not write a report on his interrogation.

On November 16, 2001, six weeks after his interrogation, Leader and Assistant U.S. Attorney Loan Hong made a joint application to Judge Amon asking for Headley's supervised release to be terminated three years early. Amon agreed to their request and discharged Headley from any further probation. Leader has claimed that the DEA was involved in the drive to end Headley's probation, which would have kept him from traveling to Pakistan to continue his intelligence work on terrorists. However, the DEA has claimed that Headley wanted his probation lifted so he could travel to Pakistan for family reasons. DEA officials also claim that the agency officially deactivated Headley as an informant on March 27, 2002. Headley himself has claimed that he ended his work for the DEA in September 2002; other agencies claim that he remained a DEA operative as late as 2005. In February 2002, Headley went to a LeT training camp and attended a three-week introductory course on LeT ideology and jihad. That summer, Serrill Headley, who by then had moved to the town of Oxford, Pennsylvania with her brother, confided to friends that her son had become a religious fanatic and had been to terrorist training camps. While Headley was on a catering visit to his mother's house, one of her friends, Phyllis Keith, noticed that he parked his car behind her residence as if he was trying to hide it. Keith reported Headley to the FBI office in Philadelphia, which apparently did not follow through with an investigation.

In August 2002, Headley returned to Pakistan and began a second stint at the LeT training camp, spending his spare time with Shazia in Lahore. Despite already being married in Pakistan, Headley embarked on a series of affairs in the U.S. and had become engaged to a long-time Canadian girlfriend in New York City the month before. After landing in New York City in December 2002, Headley was briefly detained by border inspectors who had been on the lookout for unusual travel patterns to hubs of terrorism such as Pakistan. However, the border inspectors found nothing amiss and soon released him. Headley married her at a Jamaican resort a few days later.

In the summer of 2005, she confronted him after learning about his other marriages, and about his trips to the LeT training camps in Pakistan, Headley then proceeded to hit her during an argument at his Manhattan video store. After Headley was arrested for assault, his wife called a government hotline and disclosed his terrorist activities. She was subsequently interviewed three times by the FBI's Joint Terrorism Task Force. The FBI, citing Headley's work for the DEA, did not consider him a threat despite the accusations leveled against him in 2001 and 2002. The FBI agent investigating the matter speculated that Headley's wife made her accusations because she had "an axe to grind" regarding his other marriage. Headley was never questioned, and the assault charge was eventually dropped. Headley later closed his video store.

In June 2006, Headley's Canadian wife applied for a green card under the Violence Against Women Act which allows those in abusive relationships with United States citizens to proceed with their immigration intent, without relying on their initial spousal petitioners. During her immigration interview she made reference to Headley's radicalization and terrorist training; his anti-Semitic and anti-Hindu prejudices; and his praise for suicide bombers. USCIS granted her a green card, but did not alert law enforcement about Headley because of strict privacy laws governing immigration cases which involve spousal abuse.

== 26/11 (Mumbai plot) ==
=== Name change and ISI recruitment ===
By 2005, Headley's training had advanced to the point where he wanted to fight in Kashmir. Instead, Headley was referred to Sajid Mir, LeT's foreign recruiter. Under Mir's direction, Headley went to Philadelphia and legally changed his name to David Coleman Headley, taking his mother's surname. Even though Pennsylvania law requires a background check for name changes, state officials apparently did not uncover Headley's previous drug convictions. The name change would make it easier for Headley to hide his Pakistani ancestry from Indian authorities, who have strict entry requirements for those of Pakistani descent.

In January 2006, Headley established ties with Adbur Rehman Hashim "Pasha" Syed, a retired Pakistan Army major and LeT militant, who put him in touch with Major Iqbal, a mysterious figure who is believed to have coordinated LeT activity through his capacity as an ISI officer. Under sworn testimony, Headley recalled meeting Iqbal and his superior, a Pakistani colonel, in a safe house. Iqbal and Mir reportedly became Headley's ISI handlers and oversaw his training in espionage techniques in preparation for a reconnaissance mission to Mumbai; he met with Iqbal and Mir separately so that the ISI could maintain plausible deniability. In February, Headley was again detained by border inspectors at New York's John F. Kennedy International Airport after returning from Pakistan, and was again released. That month, he contacted his former DEA handler for the final time.

=== Trips to Mumbai ===
Over the course of 2007, LeT's plot for the Mumbai attacks started to materialize, and the Western-looking Headley was considered the ideal militant to perform reconnaissance missions. Using $25,000 supplied to him by Iqbal, Headley opened a Mumbai branch office for Tahawwur Rana's immigration business—which Headley had already used to traffic heroin—as a front company. Between 2007 and 2008, Headley made five trips to Mumbai, scouting local landmarks where LeT terrorists would carry out the multi-pronged attack. Headley stayed at the Taj Palace Hotel—identified by Iqbal and Mir as their main target—and surveyed the building using his ISI training, shooting hours of video during in-house tours.

Iqbal and Mir were emboldened by Headley's intelligence and decided to make their attack more ambitious in scale. As they expanded their list of targets, Headley scouted the Oberoi Trident Hotel, the Leopold Cafe, and the Chhatrapati Shivaji Terminus. When LeT decided to target the Nariman House, a Jewish community center, Headley visited the location posing as a Jew. Headley also took boat tours to look for places where the attackers could reach the city through the waterfront; he found a landing location at a fishermen's slum in the Colaba area of southern Mumbai, where he gathered GPS coordinates. For the maritime reconnaissance, Headley received assistance from a frogman in the Pakistan Navy.

== Denmark terrorist plot ==
=== First visit and Kashmiri allegiance ===
In October 2008, one month before the Mumbai attacks, Mir and Iqbal assigned Headley to scout the Jyllands-Posten newspaper in Copenhagen, which they wanted to attack in retribution for its publication of cartoons of Muhammad. Headley visited the editorial offices of Jyllands-Posten in January 2009, claiming to be interested in buying ad space. After meeting with the paper's advertising executive, Headley drove to Jyllands-Posten's newspaper building in Aarhus and met another executive there. Elsewhere during his trip, Headley collected video footage of Copenhagen, including the offices of Jyllands-Posten; looked into leasing an apartment that could be used by LeT's attack team; and inquired about getting a job as a secretary. After being told by his LeT handlers that the plot would be put on hold, Headley became disenchanted with the group. Syed became Headley's new handler and introduced him to Ilyas Kashmiri, leader of Harkat-ul-Jihad al-Islami, an Islamist organization linked to Al-Qaeda active in Pakistan, India, Afghanistan and Bangladesh.

=== Second visit ===
Headley planned to return to Copenhagen during the summer of 2009. Kashmiri put him in contact with two al-Qaeda operatives: Simon and Bash, who were living in Derby, England. However, when Headley visited Derby on July 26, 2009, Simon and Bash informed him that they did not want to participate in the Denmark plot and were unable to supply weapons, instead, offering him US$15,000 in financing. Headley then traveled to Stockholm to meet a Farid, a veteran militant. He was also unable to help Headley as he was under tight surveillance by the Swedish Police Authority. When Headley arrived in Copenhagen by train on July 31, he shot video of a Royal Danish Army barracks and approached drug dealers about acquiring guns.

== Arrest and charges ==
Upon arriving at Hartsfield–Jackson Atlanta International Airport in Atlanta, Georgia on August 5, 2009, Headley was questioned by airport inspectors. By this point, the FBI had put Headley on a watch list and engaged in a two-month surveillance operation, debriefing Headley's former DEA handler and reviewing records of past inquiries. Eventually, investigators began to suspect Headley of being involved with the Mumbai attacks. On October 3, Headley was arrested at Chicago's O'Hare International Airport while he was attempting to travel to Pakistan to deliver the footage he collected in Denmark.

During his interrogation, Headley gave up information on LeT, Al-Qaeda, the ISI, and various terror plots and methods. Supervised by federal agents, he helped set up a trap against a militant in Germany and attempted to lure Sajid Mir out of Pakistan. Despite this, Headley, along with Rana, was charged in his involvement with Kashmiri's plot against Jyllands-Posten. Headley was accused of traveling to Denmark to scout the Jyllands-Posten office and a nearby synagogue. The FBI later additionally charged Headley of conspiring to bomb targets in the Mumbai attacks and providing material support to LeT.

India's National Investigation Agency (NIA) registered a case against Headley and Rana for allegedly plotting the Mumbai attacks. After questioning Headley in Chicago for a week, the NIA requested a Delhi court to issue non-bailable warrants to arrest Headley and other conspirators. Then Indian Home Minister P. Chidambaram reported that U.S. authorities shared "significant information" about the case. U.S. Assistant Secretary of State Robert O. Blake, Jr. promised that India would have "full access" to question Headley, although the possibility of extraditing him appeared to be precluded by Headley's plea agreement with U.S. Attorney Patrick Fitzgerald. Chidambaram said they would continue to try to get him extradited. A classified Indian report, based on Headley's interrogation by Indian investigators in Chicago, concludes that some of Headley's scouting trips to Mumbai were financed and planned by the ISI. When this report was leaked to U.S. media in October 2010, its conclusions were denied by Pakistani authorities.

In March 2009, Headley made another trip to India to conduct surveillance of the National Defence College in Delhi, and of Chabad Houses in various cities in India.

=== Passport issues ===
Indian investigators were surprised at how easily Headley had obtained a visa to enter India, a process that is extremely difficult for Pakistani nationals and Pakistani-origin individuals. Headley's U.S. passport, his new American-sounding name, and that the passport and his visa application made no mention of his prior name or his father's nationality, made it easy for him to obtain an Indian visa from the Indian consulate in Chicago. He falsely stated on his visa application that his father's name was William Headley and that his own name at birth was "Headley", a claim that was difficult to refute since the U.S. passport, unlike the Indian one, does not provide the father's name, and does not require endorsements on name changes by the passport holder. Indian government officials said that if the name change had been noted on his passport, Indian immigration officials would have been alerted during his multiple visits to India. On his visits to India, Headley befriended several people, including Rahul Bhatt, Bhatt said he never suspected Headley of any wrongdoing.

=== India's suspicion about U.S. relationship with Headley ===
While government officials in India cite full cooperation by U.S. authorities, the opposition parties and others in India have demanded explanations of why Headley was allowed to travel freely for years between India, Pakistan, and the U.S., and why he was working undercover for the DEA. Some Indian analysts have speculated that David Headley was a double agent for the Central Intelligence Agency that had infiltrated LeT, an accusation denied by the CIA. "Any suggestion that Headley was working for the CIA is complete and utter nonsense. It's flat-out false", Paul Gimigliano, from the CIA's Office of Public Affairs, said. As soon as Headley was arrested in Chicago, India's media had a barrage of questions for the government about him, whose answers were slow in coming. Among other questions, Indian investigators wanted the FBI to share its tapes of Headley's communications with his Pakistani handlers to match with the voices taped on cell phones during the 2008 Mumbai attacks.

Following intense coverage and speculation in India's media, then-U.S. ambassador Timothy J. Roemer in April 2010 told reporters in New Delhi that the United States was working at the "highest level" to provide India access to Headley, even as it was passing along answers to questions in "real time".

News reports in October 2010 revealed that U.S. authorities had much advance knowledge about Headley's terrorist associations and activities. Headley's American and Moroccan wives had contacted American authorities in 2005 and 2007, respectively, complaining about his terrorist activities. The Moroccan wife told reporters that she had even shown the U.S. embassy in Islamabad photographs of their stay at the Taj Mahal Palace Hotel in Mumbai, warning them that he was doing something on behalf of Lashkar-e-Taiba.

Since Headley's guilty plea, Home Minister P. Chidambaram was repeatedly asked why the U.S. cannot extradite Headley to India. Analysts in some media outlets have speculated that the United States conspired to have Headley work undercover despite knowledge that he was involved in terrorism.

=== NIA interrogation of Headley ===
In June 2010, US National Security Adviser James Jones announced that India's National Investigation Agency (NIA) had been given access to Headley. The investigation has confirmed that Lashkar-e-Taiba terrorists carried out the Mumbai attack under the "guidance" of Pakistan's Inter-Services Intelligence (ISI). Headley stated that the ISI was engaged with the Lashkar commanders responsible for the Mumbai deaths and injuries at each and every stage of the plot.

Hafiz Muhammad Saeed, with the help of Ilyas Kashmiri, drafted Headley for the plan to attack the Danish newspaper Jylland Posten, which had published cartoons of Muhammad considered controversial by Muslims. Headley's original handler, Sajid Mir, wanted him to focus on Lashkar's anti-India mission.

Headley has claimed that Ishrat Jahan, thought to be a case of staged police "encounter killing", was a trained LeT suicide bomber. On May 31, 2011, however, Headley contradicted his previous statements, and testified that the Inter-Services Intelligence (ISI) leadership was not involved in planning the 2008 Mumbai attacks.

=== Pune attack claims ===
In relation to the 2010 Pune blast at the German bakery that injured at least 53 people and killed 18, of whom 6 were foreigners, Indian Home Secretary, G. K. Pillai and the Hindustan Times referred to Headley. The Hindustan Times stated that Headley had visited Pune in July 2008 and March 2009 and referred to him as a Lashkar-e-Taiba member. The Hindustan Times reported that the CCTV footage which was accessed by the Investigating agency, could help solve the mystery.

=== Review of U.S. handling of Headley ===
The United States Director of National Intelligence James R. Clapper conducted a review of slip-ups in handling Headley's involvement in the 26/11 Mumbai terror attacks. His report was shared with India's Union Home Ministry.

=== Sentencing ===
On January 24, 2013, Headley was sentenced by U.S. District Judge Harry Leinenweber of the United States District Court for the Northern District of Illinois in Chicago to 35 years in prison followed by 5 years of supervised release for his part in the 2008 Mumbai attacks and Copenhagen terror plot. Leinenweber called Headley a terrorist and said he hoped he would die in prison, telling him he deserved to be executed. "The sentence I impose, I'm hopeful it will keep Mr. Headley under lock and key for the rest of his natural life," Leinenweber said. "That's what you deserve. I don't have any faith in Mr. Headley when he says he's a changed person and believes in the American way of life." Headley could have been sentenced to life imprisonment, but federal prosecutors recommended a 35-year sentence in view of Headley's extensive cooperation with the government. Headley had provided details on the operations of the Pakistani terrorist group Lashkar-e-Taiba, which planned the Mumbai attacks, and information that he provided to the government led to charges against Tahawwur Hussain Rana and six other terrorist figures.

=== Subsequent developments ===
The day after the sentence was imposed, the Indian government announced it would continue to seek Headley's extradition to India. In April 2013, it was reported that while imprisoned, Headley had written a memoir detailing his involvement with Lashkar-e-Taiba and the Mumbai attacks.

In July 2015, it was reported that the Mumbai police were seeking to take a deposition of Headley by video conference to provide evidence against Zabiuddin Ansari. On December 10, 2015, a Mumbai court pardoned Headley, making him an approver in the Mumbai case. Deposition started in Bombay High Court via video conference on February 8, 2016. He told the court that LeT made two unsuccessful attempts to carry out terror attacks before finally striking in November 2008, once in September and again in October.

On February 9, 2016, it was reported that Headley had confessed to a Mumbai court about LeT and Inter-Services Intelligence having penetrated into the ranks of the Indian Army, to work as spies. Headley also said that an attack had also been planned on the Indian defence scientists who were to meet at the conference hall in Taj Hotel, in Mumbai, in 2007. For this purpose, he added, he had carried out a reconnaissance on the naval air station, INS Kunjali, INS Shikra and the Siddhivinayak Temple, Mumbai.

On July 24, 2018, it was reported that Headley was seriously injured after being attacked in prison, and subsequently admitted to the critical care unit of Evanston Hospital of the NorthShore University HealthSystem.

== Media portrayals ==
He is portrayed by J. Brandon Hill in the 2015 Indian action thriller film Phantom, and by Carl Andrew Harte in the 2025 Indian spy thriller film Dhurandhar.
