= Association of Physicians of Pakistani Descent of North America =

Pakistan nonprofit organization

- Formation: 29 August 1977; 49 years ago
- Headquarters: Westmont, Illinois, United States
- Members: 3,000-3,500 members
- Website: appna.org

The Association of Physicians of Pakistani Descent of North America (APPNA) is an American nonprofit organization headquartered in Westmont, Illinois, United States. It is one of the largest medical associations in the United States.

APPNA is the largest medical organization of expatriate Pakistanis.

== Founding ==
In 1976, Dr. Zaheer Ahmed, a Pakistani gastroenterologist based in Michigan, envisioned an idea of a professional organization of Pakistani physicians in the U.S and Canada that would provide a platform for social gatherings and a vehicle for educational and humanitarian projects in Pakistan. APPNA was registered in the state of Michigan as a non-profit charitable organization on 29 August 1978. The Internal Revenue Service granted it tax exempt status in 1983.

== Past presidents ==
The list of APPNA's past presidents includes:

1. Dr. Zaheer Ahmed, 1979-80 (King Edward Medical College)
2. Dr. Kamil Muzaffar, 1980-81 (King Edward Medical College)
3. Dr. M Ayub Omayya, 1981 and 1982 (King Edward Medical College)
4. Dr. S. Amjad Hussain, 1982-83 (Khyber Medical College)
5. Dr. Amanullah Khan, 1983-84 (King Edward Medical College)
6. Dr. M. Aslam Malik, 1984-85 (Nishtar Medical College)
7. Dr. Ikramullah Khan, 1985-86 (Dow Medical College)
8. Dr. Hassan Imam Bukhari, 1986-97 (King Edward Medical College)
9. Dr. Nasim Ashraf, 1987-88 (Khyber Medical College)
10. Dr. Mohammad Murtaza Arain, 1988-89 (Liaquat Medical College)
11. Dr. Arif Ali Akbar Toor, 1989-90 (King Edward Medical College)
12. Dr. Arif Muslim, 1990-91 (King Edward Medical College)
13. Dr. Mushtaq A. Khan, 1991-92 (Dow Medical College)
14. Dr. Prevez Ali Shah, 1992-93 (Dow Medical College)
15. Dr. M. Khalid Riaz, 1993-94 (King Edward Medical College)
16. Dr. Waheed Akbar, 1994-95 (King Edward Medical College)
17. Dr. Mushtaq Sharif, 1996 (King Edward Medical College)
18. Dr. Shaukat H. Khan, 1997 (Nishtar Medical College)
19. Dr. Durdana Gilani, 1998 (King Edward Medical College)
20. Dr. Shabir H. Safdar, 1999
21. Dr. M. Javed Akhtar, 2000 (King Edward Medical College)
22. Dr. Riaz Chaudhry, 2001 (King Edward Medical College)
23. Dr. Mohammad Suleman, 2002 (King Edward Medical College)
24. Dr. Raana Akbar, 2003 (King Edward Medical College)
25. Dr. Omar Taimoor Atiq, 2004 (Khyber Medical College)
26. Dr. Hussain G. Malik, 2005
27. Dr. Abdul Rashid Piracha 2006 (Nishtar Medical College)
28. Dr. Nadeem A. Kazi, 2007 (Sind Medical College)
29. Dr. Mahmood Alam, 2008 (Allama Iqbal Medical College)
30. Dr. Syed Abdus Samad, 2009 (Dow Medical College)
31. Dr. Zeelaf B. Munir, 2010 (Dow Medical College)
32. Dr. Manzoor A. Tariq, 2011 (Quaid-e-Azam Medical College)
33. Dr. Saima Zafar, 2012 (King Edward Medical College)
34. Dr. Javed Suleman, 2013 (Sind Medical College)
35. Dr. Asif M. Rehman, 2014 (Nishtar Medical College)
36. Dr. Mubasher E. Rana, 2015 (King Edward Medical College)
37. Dr. M. Nasar Qureshi, 2016 (Dow Medical College)
38. Dr. Sajid Chaudhary, 2017 (Allama Iqbal Medical College)
39. Dr. Iqbal Zafar Hamid, 2018 (Sind Medical College)
40. Dr. Naseem A. Shekhani, 2019 (Dow Medical College)
41. Dr. Ghazala Naheed Usmani, 2020 (King Edward Medical College)
42. Dr. M. Rizwan Khalid, 2021 (Aga Khan Medical College)
43. Dr. Haroon H. Durrani, 2022 (Nishtar Medical College)
44. Dr. Arshad Rehan, 2023 (Khyber Medical College)

== Constituent alumni organizations ==
The following university alumni organizations are constituent members of APPNA:

- Aga Khan University Alumni Association of North America (AKUAANA)
- Allama Iqbal Medical College Alumni Association of North America (AIMCAANA)
- Alumni Association of Physicians of Liaquat University of Medical and Health Sciences of North America (LUMHS)
- Army Medical College Alumni Association of North America (AMCOLAANA)
- Association of Physicians of Pakistani-descent of Caribbean Medical Schools (APPCMS)
- Bolan Medical College Alumni Association of North America (BMCAANA)
- Dental APPNA
- Dow Graduates Association of North America (DOGANA)
- Fatima Jinnah Medical College Alumni Association of North America (FJMCAANA)
- Jinnah Sind Medical University Alumni Association of North America (JSMUAANA)
- Khyber Medical College Alumni Association of North America (KMCAANA)
- King Edward Medical College Alumni Association of North America (KEMCAANA)
- Nishtar Medical College Alumni Association of North America (NANA)
- North American Medical Alumni of APPNA (NAMA)
- Punjab Medical College Alumni Association of North America (PMCAANA)
- Quaid-e-Azam Medical College Alumni Association of North America (QMCAANA)
- Rawalpindi Medical College Alumni Association of North America (RMCAANA)

== Representation in Pakistan Government Health Task Force ==
In December 2021, Prime Minister of Pakistan Imran Khan gave APPNA representation in his government's health task force for getting its input towards improving the healthcare system in the country.

== Meetings ==
APPNA holds four meetings through the year. Its meetings present opportunities for continuing medical education as well as social get-togethers. The four meetings are:

1. Spring meeting
2. Annual summer convention
3. Fall meeting
4. Winter meeting

== Activism ==
Amidst news of the exorbitantly high prices of the COVID-19 vaccine set in Pakistan, APPNA wrote to the Prime Minister to express its concern. "A human tragedy must not be allowed to be used for profiteering," the APPNA association pleaded in the letter. The association recommended that the government should undertake the task of importing the vaccine itself, "on an emergent basis" as it is "best positioned to negotiate favorable rates with manufacturers." The group of doctors noted that although ideally the vaccine should be available to all free of cost, but if the country's financial situation did not allow it, it should be sold "at no more than cost". It also urged for subsidies to be provided to the poor regardless.

In March 2022, the United States Department of State acknowledged APPNA's efforts for COVID-19 relief.

APPNA members offer free community healthcare through free clinics.
