= Tariq Saeed Mufti =

Pakistani surgeon

Tariq Saeed Mufti, born on January 1, 1948 (age 78), is a surgeon and a medical educator who resides in Peshawar, Pakistan. He is Professor Emeritus, Rehman Medical College.

== Career ==
He had his initial schooling from a government high school in Peshawar and his premedical schooling from Edwardes College Peshawar. After qualifying his MBBS from Khyber Medical College in Peshawar, he proceeded to UK for training in general surgery and was awarded 'fellowship' from Royal College of Surgeons of Edinburgh in February 1979.

After returning to his native country, he continued his career at Ayub Medical College in Abbottabad, where he acceded to become a professor of surgery for seventeen years and held the chair of the department for eight years. During his service at this institution, he remained Chief Executive of the Ayub Teaching Institution for two tenures and held the position of Principal and Dean of Ayub Medical College until he retired from the institution. Then, he was assigned as the Principal of KUST Institute of Medical Sciences in Kohat. He successfully developed the institution to get its recognition by the Pakistan Medical and Dental Council (PMDC) and Ministry of Health in a short time. He then joined Rehman Medical Institute at Peshawar as the head of department of Surgery and Project Director for developing a new medical school, Rehman Medical College. The institute was approved by Ministry of Health, Government of Pakistan and is affiliated with Khyber Medical University. Tariq Mufti was appointed as pioneer Principal of Rehman Medical College. He also served as Dean for undergraduates at Khyber Medical University and for postgraduates at College of Physicians and Surgeons Pakistan (CPSP).

Tariq Mufti has also pioneered two research medical journals. He was a founding member of Journal of Ayub Medical College (JAMC) where he remained its chief editor for nearly ten years. He also founded KUST Medical Journal (KMJ), an open access peerreviewed journal. He has served as a member of the editorial board for other research medical journals of Pakistan including Pakistan Journal of Surgery and JSP.

== Biography ==
Mufti shares his life story in "Kalam-e-Natammam," detailing his personal and professional journey. The autobiography provides insights into his childhood, education, medical training, and professional experiences, including challenges and successes.

Mufti reflects on his career, admitting to professional errors and sharing lessons learned. He discusses the healthcare system, ethical practices, and challenges faced by medical professionals. Throughout the book, Mufti emphasizes the importance of learning from mistakes and ethical medical practice. He also highlights his contributions to medical education and institution-building. The autobiography offers valuable lessons for medical students, graduates, and young professionals.
