= Zulfiqar Bhutta =

Canadian academic and scientist

Zulfiqar Bhutta OC FRS
- Citizenship: Pakistan
- Occupations: Educator, scientist
- Awards: Pride of Performance Award (2017)

Academic background
- Education: Khyber Medical College, Peshawar; Karolinska Institute, Stockholm

Academic work
- Discipline: Maternal, Newborn and Child Health, Pediatrics and nutritional sciences

Zulfiqar A. Bhutta OC FRS is a physician. He holds titles across various organizations in diverse geographies. Professor Bhutta is the founding director of the Center of Excellence in Women and Child Health & Institute for Global Child Health & Development, at the Aga Khan University South-Central Asia, East Africa & United Kingdom.

As of 2022, Zulfiqar Bhutta is the co-director at the Centre for Global Child Health, at the Hospital for Sick Children, Canada and leads many projects as a Senior Scientist at the Research Institute in the Centre for Global Child Health at Sick Kids. He holds a Professorship at the University of Toronto in the Department of Nutritional Sciences and the Division of Epidemiology, Dalla Lana School of Public Health. Additionally, he holds concurrent professorship at the Department of Paediatrics, Aga Khan University in Karachi, Pakistan and at the Schools of Public Health of Johns Hopkins University, Tufts University, Boston University, University of Alberta and the London School of Hygiene & Tropical Medicine.

He is a designated Distinguished National Professor of the Government of Pakistan and was the Founding Chair of the National Research Ethics Committee of the Government of Pakistan from 2003 to 2014.

== Early life and education ==
Bhutta received his MBBS degree from Khyber Medical College in Peshawar, Pakistan in 1977. His PhD work was completed at Karolinska Institute in Stockholm, Sweden in 1996. He is a Fellow of the Royal College of Physicians (Edinburgh & London), the Royal College of Paediatrics and Child Health (London), American Academy of Paediatrics and the Pakistan Academy of Sciences.

== Career ==
Following the completion of his bachelor's degree, Bhutta began working as House Surgeon in Obstetrics & Gynecology at the Khyber Teaching Hospital, Peshawar (April–November 1978). He began work in paediatrics as a physician in November 1978 in the Professorial Unit at the Institute of Child Health, Jinnah Postgraduate Medical Centre, Karachi (Pakistan). Through 1980s he continued his work as a surgeon and paediatrician. He undertook his first professor position in the Department of Paediatrics, The Aga Khan University Hospital, Karachi (Pakistan), from November 1987 to June 1992.

In 2005, Bhutta became the Chairman of the Department of Paediatrics & Child Health at the Aga Khan University & Medical Center, a position held until 2008. Following his term as Chairman he became The Noordin Noormahomed Sheriff Professor & Founding Chair, Division of Women & Child Health, The Aga Khan University, a position he held for four years.

Bhutta currently holds the titles of co-director of the Centre for Global Child Health at the Hospital for Sick Children in Toronto, and founding director of the Centre of Excellence in Women and Child Health at the Aga Khan University. In 2020, he was appointed founding director of the Institute for Global child Health & Development at the Aga Khan University and elected Fellow to the Royal Society, United Kingdom.

Outside of his professional responsibilities Bhutta serves on various local and international boards and committees, including a series of editorial boards.

Editorial Responsibilities
Board	Time Period
Member Editorial Board Journal of College of Physicians & Surgeons, Pakistan	1992-2003
Associate Editor, Pakistan Paediatric Journal	
Member Editorial Board, Pakistan Journal of Medical Sciences.	
Member-Editorial Board "Health Research Policy & Systems" (WHO. Geneva)	
Member Editorial Advisory Board, Current Paediatrics (USA)	2006-2009
Member Editorial Advisory Board, British Medical Journal (UK)	
Member Editorial Board, Issues in Medical Ethics (India)	
Section Editor Child Health, Maternal and Child Nutrition (UK)	2004-2009
Member Editorial Board, Transactions of Royal Society of Tropical Medicine & Hygiene (UK)	2003-2007
Member Editorial Board, Archives of Diseases in Childhood (UK)	
Editorial Consultant, the Lancet (UK)	
International Editorial Advisor Indian J Pediatrics	2009-2012
Guest Editor, BMJ Special Issue on South Asia	April 2004 & 2017
Guest Editor, BMJ Special Issue on Learning from Developing Countries	November 2004
Guest Editor BMJ Special Issue on Middle East	November 2006
Member Editorial Board Journal of Health, Population & Nutrition, ICCDRB, Bangladesh	
Member Editorial Board Journal of Health, Population & Nutrition, ICCDRB, Bangladesh	2005
Member editorial advisory board, J Infectious Diseases & Public Health	2008
Editorial Board member PLoS Medicine, PLoS One and PLoS Neglected Tropical Diseases	
Editorial Board Member, TropIKA. Net (WHO TDR program)	
Editorial Board BMC Public Health, BMC Pregnancy & Child Birth & BMC Reproductive Health	
Editorial Board, Maternal and Child Health Journal	
Editorial Board, Population Health Metrics	
Member Editorial Board Cochrane Respiratory Infections Group	2010-2017
CDPLPG group	2012-2017

Technical Steering Group Committee Membership
Alive & Thrive program of the Association for Educational Development, Washington DC and University of California Davis
Malaria Eradication Research Agenda (University of Maryland & Swiss Tropical Research Institute)
Technical Working Group, Program for Evaluation of Etiology in Pneumonia (PERCH), Johns Hopkins University
Global Alliance for Prevention of Prematurity and Stillbirths ( GAPPS) University of Seattle
Community based Neonatal Chlorhexidine application trials (University of Pune) & Boston University
Technical Advisory Group, Maternal Preeclampsia Prevention Trials (PREEMPT), University of British Columbia, Vancouver
Technical Advisory Group, Maternal Health Task Force, Harvard School of Public Health
Technical Advisory Group International Study of Etiology of Maternal and Neonatal Sepsis (MANISA and ANISA)
Technical Advisory Group International Study of Etiology of Maternal and Neonatal Sepsis (MANISA and ANISA)
Member Steering Committee, GONET, Royal College of Obstetricians & Gynaecologists, UK.
Co-chair, Institute of Medicine Forum on Investing in Young Children, Washington DC 2013-2017
Scientific Advisory Group, Fleming Fund for Antimicrobial Resistance, UK 2016-

In his various capacities Bhutta has produced a large collection of publications working with his teams at Sick Kids, AKU and international partners. These include book reviews, chapters, and articles.

Since 2019, Bhutta has been a member of the Lancet–SIGHT Commission on Peaceful Societies Through Health and Gender Equality, chaired by Tarja Halonen.

In 2020, he served on "A future for the world's children?", a WHO-UNICEF-Lancet Commission, co-chaired by Helen Clark and Awa Coll-Seck.

Bhutta's research interests include newborn and child survival, maternal and child undernutrition and micronutrient deficiencies. He leads large research groups based in Toronto, Karachi and Nairobi with a special interest in research synthesis, scaling up evidence based interventions in community settings and implementation research in difficult circumstances and conflict settings. In particular, his work with community health workers and outreach services has influenced integrated maternal and newborn outreach programs for marginalized populations all over the world. His group's work with the WHO and PMNCH in developing consensus based essential interventions for women, children and adolescents is the dominant set of agreed interventions guiding global policy. Presently Professor Bhutta is leading two global academic consortia; one working on improving reproductive, maternal and child health in conflict settings and humanitarian emergencies and the other focused on integrated investments to improve child and adolescent health and nutrition across the 0–19 years life course.

== Awards and recognition ==
- Bhutta was awarded the Ihsan Doğramacı Family Health Foundation Prize by World Health Organization in 2014,
- Pride of Performance Award by the President of Pakistan Mamnoon Hussain in 2017.
- Bhutta was a recipient of the TWAS Prize (The World Academy of Sciences) in 2016.
- He was elected a Foreign Member of the Royal Society in 2020.
- He was awarded the Roux prize for public health achievements in 2021.
- He was awarded the John Dirks Canada Gairdner Global Health Award in 2022.
- He was awarded the Henry G. Friesen International Prize in Health Research in 2023.
