= Tuppy Owens =

British sex therapist and campaigner (1944–2025)

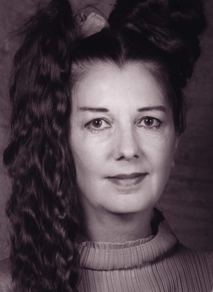
- Tuppy Owens in 1998
- Born: Rosalind Mary Owens; 12 November 1944; Cambridge, England
- Died: 28 February 2025 (aged 80); Dingwall, Scotland
- Occupations: Human rights activist; sexual health activist; writer; therapist; advocate
- Years active: 1970–2024

Rosalind Mary "Tuppy" Owens (12 November 1944 – 28 February 2025) was an English human rights and sexual health activist, therapist, consultant, campaigner, writer and adult model.

== Education ==
Born in Cambridge, Owens gained a degree in zoology from Exeter University, and then worked in ecology in Africa and Trinidad. She settled in London, and worked as a scientific administrator at the Natural Environment Research Council. Then, in the late 1960s, she established a sex education book publishing company, for which she wrote and published The Sex Maniac's Diary successfully between 1972 and 1995, and which she operated as a thriving business from her Mayfair flat — for example, the 1975 Sex Maniac's Diary was launched in August 1974 with a reception at the Bristol Hotel in London which was reported on the following day in the Financial Times.

== Work ==
From 1974, Owens also began lecturing on the subject of sex. In 1975, she appeared in the Dutch pornographic film Sensations. From 1984, the Sex Maniac's Diary was published as The Safer Sex Maniac's Diary and provided the first visual instructions to the public on how to put a condom on securely; it also reviewed condoms and offered safer sex advice, all at the beginning of the outbreak of HIV.

In 1979, Owens started the Outsiders Club for socially and physically disabled people to find partners. She was helped by Nigel Verbeek, who had recently lost his sight. Both worked voluntarily, which Owens continued to do. Outsiders is a club providing peer support to members, an online Clubhouse, and monthly lunches around the country.

In order to ensure that she answered the members' questions with accuracy, Owens trained as a sex therapist at St George's Hospital Medical School in London, where she gained a diploma in Human Sexuality in 1986. She was also subsequently awarded an Honorary Doctorate from the Institute for Advanced Study of Human Sexuality in San Francisco. In 2009, Owens was named one of the Family Planning Association's 80 most influential achievers in the field of family planning.

For disabled men and women who want to learn what pleasures their bodies are capable of enjoying, and how to please a partner, Owens set up the TLC Trust website, where they can find responsible, safe sexual services.

In 1981, Owens appeared in the English pornographic film Lady Victoria's Training, which was produced by Mike Freeman/Videx and featured Simon Lindsay Honey, who went on to work as a porn producer and actor under the pseudonym Ben Dover.

In the 1990s, after more than 30 years living in London, Owens moved to a croft in the north of Scotland.

In 2005, Owens founded the Sexual Health and Disability Alliance (SHADA) to bring together health professionals interested in sex and disability. In November 2009, a conference with the title "Disability: Sex, Relationships and Pleasure" was held by SHADA with the Royal Society of Medicine. Owens produced the Sexual Respect Tool Kit, and started the sexual advocacy service, ASAP. She also answered the Sex and Disability Helpline. Her book "Supporting Disabled People with their Sexual Lives" was published by Jessica Kingsley on 19 November 2014.

Owens remained active in running Outsiders. At the same time, she also advised the promoter of the Sexual Freedom Ball to fund Outsiders, and the organisers of the fundraiser, The Erotic Awards, now called The Sexual Services and Entertainment Awards.

Owens was the chair of the Sexual Freedom Coalition. Back in the 90s Owens worked campaigning with Prostitution Pride, parades through London, which were funded by Arcadia events in North London.

Owens had been working with Designability (formerly the Bath Institute of Medical Engineering) in the hope that they would be able to create sex toys that could be used by disabled people who, without them, cannot masturbate.

Owens was the editor of a forthcoming website, The School of Sex for Disabled People, which was being created by sexually experienced disabled people and those who provide them with sexual services.

Owens had been writing her autobiography when diagnosed with vascular dementia. She completed The Sex Lady on the Hill: The Extraordinary Legacy of Dr Tuppy Owens, with the assistance of her friend Emma Buckett, and it was published in 2024.

== Death ==
Owens died from vascular dementia in Scotland, on 28 February 2025, at the age of 80.

== Award ==
Owens won the 2015 Lifetime Achievement Award from the European Lifestyles Awards. She is also a Winner of the Innovation Award of Sexual Health and Human Rights UNESCO 2015. She was a finalist (Lifetime Achievement) in the Directory of Social Change Awards 2015.

== Publications ==
- Photographs of caterpillars in Trinidad Scientific American: August 1967
- Sexual Harmony. London: Highbury Press, 1969
- Love in the Open Air. London: Cand Haven Ltd., 1970
- The Sex Maniac's Diary. London: Cand Haven Ltd., 1972-1995 (from 1987 called The Safer Sex Maniac's Diary)
- Column in Club International. London: Paul Raymond Publications, 1975–6
- Take Me I'm Yours. Edinburgh: Paul Harris Publishing, 1978
- Mothercare Diary. London: Reader's Digest, 1980
- Practical Suggestions. London: Outsiders Trust, from 1980 to present
- Emotions in Focus — catalogue of the Exhibition of the same name which opened at The Round House in 1983 (International Year of Disabled People). London: the Outsiders Trust, 1983
- INSIDE. London: the Outsiders Trust, 1984–1998 and 2002–present
- The Sex Maniac's Bible. London: Cand Haven Ltd., 1989
- The Sex Maniac's Address Book. London: Cand Haven Ltd., 1989
- Little Book of Delights (annually). London: the Leydig Trust, 1989–present
- The Organ monthly. London: Cand Haven Ltd., 1990–1993
- The Making of Sensations. New York: Rhinoceros, 1993
- Introduction to Half Dressed, She Obeyed. Stockport: Divine Press, 1993
- The Politically Correct Guide to Getting Laid. London: Cand Haven Ltd., 1995
- The Sexual Skills and Needs of Disabled Men — A Female Perspective Sexuality & Disability Journal. New York: Kluwer Academic/Human Sciences Press, 1996
- Planet Sex — The Handbook. London: Cand Haven Ltd, 1996
- Disabled People Make the Best Clients presented at the ICOP Conference, Los Angeles 1997 and then globally
- A column in Desire 2000–2008
- Contributions to The Sex Book. London: Cassells, 2002
- Foreword to Baby Oil and Ice. London: The Do-Not Press, 2002
- Columns in Forum and Erotic Review, 2005–2009
- Content for the Sex and Disability section of the Lovers' Guide website 2007
- Philip's Aspidistra: the Owens' Bequest in About Larkin, Journal of the Philip Larkin Society No 24, October 2007
- Sex and Disability, an article on TheSite.org, Youthnet, 2009
- Chapters in A Guide to Sexual Dysfunction in Men. Leicestershire: Troubador Publishing Ltd., 2010
- Ten Things to Know About Sex and Disability. London: Royal College of Art and Imperial College, 2010
- Chapter entitled Disability and Sex Work in book Queer Sex Work, Taylor and Francis Books 2014
- Supporting Disabled People with their Sexual Lives, — a clear guide for health and social care professionals with Claire de Than. Jessica Kingsley 2014
- The Sex Lady on the Hill: The Extraordinary Legacy of Dr Tuppy Owens with Emma Buckett. Pom Publishing 2024
