= Cadet College Hasan Abdal =

Cadet college in Pakistan

Coordinates: 33.819161°N 72.677211°E

Location
- Grand Trunk Road/N5; Hasan Abdal; Attock; Punjab; Pakistan

Information
- Motto: Second to None
- Opened: 1954
- Principal: Brigadier (R) Nasir Saeed Khattaq SI(M)
- Chairman Board of Governors: Governor of the Punjab
- Staff: 47
- Gender: Boys
- Age: 12 to 19
- Enrollment: c. 550
- Area: 98 acres (40 ha)
- Colour: Blue
- Demonym: Abdalians
- Wings (houses): 6
- Website: www.cch.edu.pk

Cadet College Hasanabdal (CCH) is a residential secondary school located in Hasan Abdal, Attock District, Punjab, Pakistan.

The college boards 600 male students (12 to 19 years old) and offers GCE 'O' Levels, A Levels from Cambridge, and HSSC (Pre-Medical & Pre-Engineering) from the Federal Board, Islamabad. The college previously offered HSSC (Pre-Medical & Pre-Engineering) however since the 2026 intake, it only offers GCE 'O' and A Levels. Students appear in a nationwide competitive examination for the merit-based selection, including those from overseas, which appear in an online exam.

== History ==
Established in 1952, Cadet College Hasanabdal was the first quasi-military boarding institution of its kind in the country, organized in the British tradition. The purpose was to establish a military feeding institution for the Services Academies. Consequently, military wings were started in 1952 at Government College Sahiwal (then known as Government College Montgomery) and Islamia College Peshawar. For the present structure, the land that used to be the firing range was provided by the Pakistan Army, and funds were allocated by the Government of Punjab. The Chief Architect for Government of the Punjab, Habib J. A. Somjee, shaped the marvels of this prestigious institution. The initial structure of Punjab Cadet College (the first name of CCH) was completed in 1954, and classes commenced in the month of April as military wings from Sahiwal and Peshawar were combined at Hasan Abdal. The college founding Principal was Hugh Catchpole, an eminent British educationist who had been at Rashtriya Indian Military College Dehradun, India, for many years before being specially invited by the then Commander-in-Chief, Ayub Khan, to raise a similar school in this new country. The campus is also Catchpole's final resting place.

== Governing Body and Management ==
In 1960, the government of the province of Punjab constituted a board of governors to exercise administrative control over the college vide Punjab Government Educational and Training Institutions Ordinance 1960. The board includes academicians, administrators, and intellectuals. The board consists of ex-officio and non-official members. The board consists of chairman, the Governor of the province of Punjab, Vice Chairman, Chairman Pakistan Ordinance Factories Board whereas members include Commissioner Rawalpindi Division, Secretary Finance Department, Secretary School Education Department, Deputy Commissioner Attock and Principal Cadet College Hasanabdal.

Under the board, various governing committees work to officiating the day-to-day affairs of the college. The executive committee is chaired by Chairman Pakistan Ordinance Factory and assisted by some prominent Abdalians; the principal acts as the secretary of the committee.

== Demographics ==
Cadet College Hasanabdal was planned as a boarding institute for almost 480 students from all across Pakistan. In 1996, the college underwent a renovation and expansion. It included wings, construction of N.D. Hasan Library and Computer Lab, resultantly, enhancing the boarding capacity of the college. The selection of the students is based on "All Pakistan Open Merit Need Blind" admission policy. This consists of a nationwide entrance examination that follows medical, physical, and psychological evaluation. Every year 120 students join as a new class.

== College Building ==
The college building stands tall on Grant Trunk Road. It includes, technology equipped classrooms and science labs. The rear side of the building is etched to the College Oval. Naeem Hall in the building serves as multi-functional auditorium where the students watch weekly movies, take exams, and attend other formal gatherings.

== Wings ==
The college is divided into six wings: Jinnah, Haider, Iqbal, Omar, Liaqat, and Aurangzeb.

| Wing | Color | Mascot | Slogan |
|---|---|---|---|
| Aurangzeb | Green | Stallion | Team up to Rise |
| Liaqat | Yellow | Markhor | We Can, We Will |
| Omar | Blue | Tiger | Above and Beyond |
| Iqbal | Burgundy | Falcon | Fly High |
| Haider | Cherry Red | Lion | Courage is Strength |
| Jinnah | Sky Blue | Wolf | Dare to be Different |

== Student Life ==
Students attending Cadet College, Hasan Abdal, are called cadets.

The college prepares boys for the secondary school and intermediate examinations conducted by the Rawalpindi Board of Intermediate and Secondary Education, and also for the General Certificate of Education 'O' Levels and 'A' Levels, which follow a similar format to the GCSEs and 'A' levels used in the UK. Matriculation and F.Sc were offered in college since its inception but with the 71st Entry (Intake of 2024) only 'O' Levels was offered. English, Urdu, Islamiyat, Pakistan Studies, Mathematics, Physics, Chemistry, and Biology are compulsory at each level; some other subjects (e.g. Computer Science) are offered within the different levels.

Fitness activities include gymnastics, jogging, and athletics. Sports time is held in the evenings on weekdays. Cadets take part in sports such as basketball, field hockey, football, horse riding, squash, swimming, tennis, and volleyball. Students are also taught drill.

Classes are conducted in the morning and preps (individual silent study periods) at night. The routine is a structured daily regime to promote maximum performance by the students.

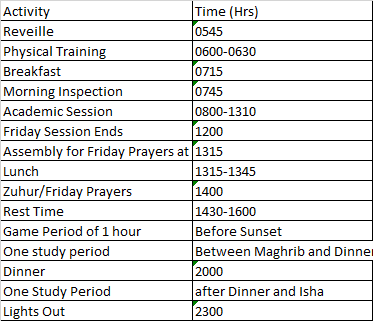

== Infrastructure ==
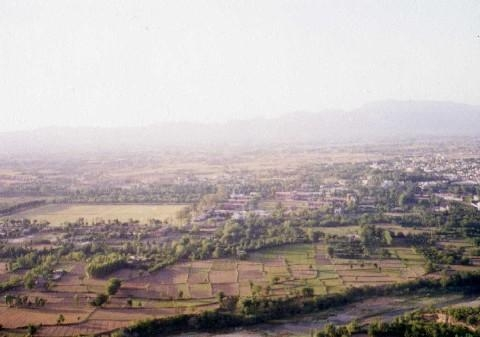
Cadet College Hasanabdal - 1993

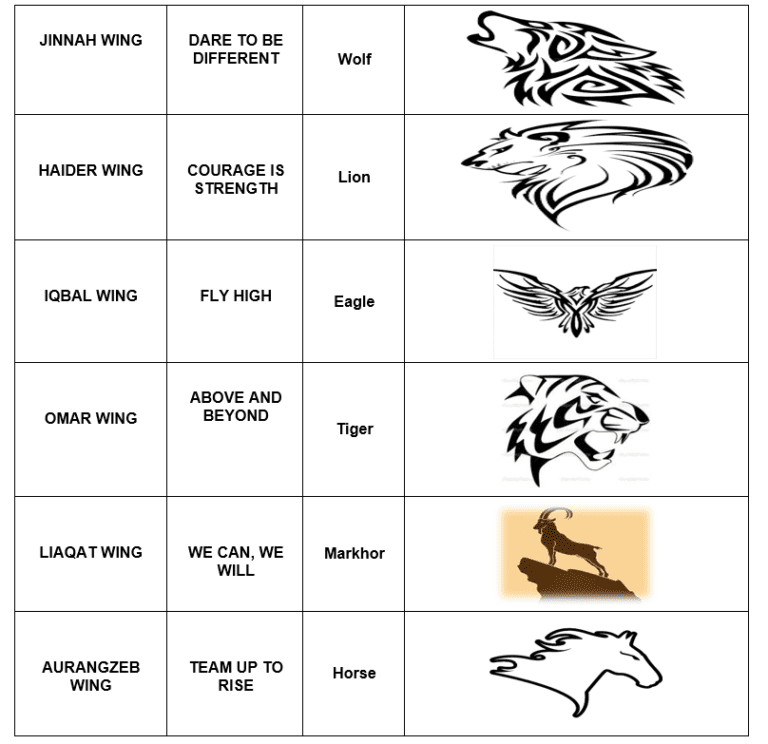
Mascots and slogans representing the college wings

The college is spread over approximately 98 acres (40 ha). Buildings on the property include a mosque, a two-story education block, college hall—known as Naeem Hall in memory of ex-cadet Captain Naeem Akhtar (Shaheed)— the six boarding wings, two cadet messes—known as Khatlani Hall and Hussain Shah Hall in memory respectively of ex-cadet Lt. Ahmed Farooq Khatlani (Shaheed) and ex-cadet Lt. Hussain Shah (Shaheed)— a swimming pool, a 16-bed hospital, the administrative block, a workshop and a hobbies block. Sports facilities include two squash courts and a number of football, hockey and cricket pitches, as well as a horse-back riding ground. The college has residential accommodation for the teaching and administrative staff based within the college. There is an oval ground in the middle of the college around which all the six wings are located. Recently, every wing has been given a slogan and a mascot. A road, "Scholar's Walk" as called by BOGs, surrounds the Oval. It is a cricket ground with flood lights installed around for playing cricket matches even at night.

== Principals ==
Principals and their tenure durations are:

| Hugh Catchpole CBE HI | 1954 - 1958 |
| Mirza Nisar Ali Baig | 1958 - 1959 |
| A.W.E Winlaw CBE | 1959 - 1964 |
| Lt. Col. J.D.H Chapman | 1964 - 1971 |
| Col. N.D Hasan | 1971 - 1978 |
| Shaukat Sultan | 1979 - 1982 |
| Brig (R) S. Naseeruddin SI (M) | 1983–1988 |
| Prof. Zafar Ali Shah | 1988 - 1993 |
| Brig (Retd) Syed Shah Babar | 1993 - 2003 |
| Prof. Syed Dilshad Hussain, HI | 2002 - 2006 |
| Air Cdre (Retd) Tayyab N. Akhtar SI (M) | 2006 - 2009 |
| Prof. Muhammad Asif Malik | 2009 - 2012 |
| Maj. General (R) Najeeb Tariq HI (M) | 2013 - 2019 |
| Brig (R) Nasir Saeed Khattak SI (M) | 2019–present |

== Controversies ==
=== Founding Principal's Burial ===
The founding principal, Hugh Catchpole, had expressed his wish to be buried on the premises of Cadet College Hasanabdal. After his death on February 1, 1997, there came two groups. One was against the idea to have anyone's grave on an academic institution whereas, the personal interest of then Air Chief Marshal Muhammad Abbas Khattak and other prominent Abdalians made this possible to find a quiet corner for the founding principal.

=== David Headly & Tahawwur Rana ===
The college attracted public attention following the 2008 Mumbai attacks, in view of the alleged involvement of two of its alumni; David Headley and Tahawwur Rana.

=== Cambridge Stream and Hefty Fee ===
In very recent times, college embarked on a journey to be an all-Cambridge institution. This decision received a great amount of criticism and divided the alumni. This decision, coupled with heavy fees, due to discontinuation of grant in aid by the Government of Punjab, has put the college administration in a very tight situation.

=== Display of Military Equipment ===
Cadet College Hasanabdal started as military feeding nursery and the majority of the early cadets joined forces. Once they reached to their better profiling in the forces they presented obsolete military equipment for display on the campus. Some alumni were of the view that as college does not have any affiliation with the armed forces now, so this military apparatus must not be displayed.

== Notable alumni ==
A few notable alumni of the institution are mentioned below:

- Mansoor Usman Awan - Attorney-General for Pakistan
- Sohaib Abbasi — former Senior Vice President of Oracle Tools and Education divisions, former CEO of Informatica
- Admiral Zafar Mahmood Abbasi — former Chief of Naval Staff, Pakistan Navy
- Asad Abidi — first dean of LUMS School of Science and Engineering, Professor of Electrical Engineering at UCLA and Cornell
- Khawaja Asif — Minister of Defence, Pakistan
- Masood Aslam — Commander XI Corps, Pakistan Army and former Inspector General Training & Evaluation (IG T&E)
- Asfandyar Bukhari — Tamgha i Jurat recipient
- Vice Admiral Tayyab Ali Dogar — former vice chief of naval staff
- Muhammad Hafizullah — vice chancellor, Khyber Medical University, Peshawar
- Hamid Javaid — former chief of staff (COS) to the president of Pakistan and former chairman HIT
- Iftikhar Ali Khan — former Secretary Defence and ex-chief of the General Staff (CGS), Pakistan Army
- Khurram Dastgir Khan — Defense Minister of Pakistan, previous minister of commerce
- Rizwan Ullah Khan — Air Commodore of the Pakistan Air Force
- Abbas Khattak — former chief of Air Staff, Pakistan Air Force
- Raja Nadir Pervez — Sitara-e-Jurat and Bar
- Javed Ashraf Qazi — former federal minister of education, communication and railways, secretary railways, commander XXX Corps, Gujranwala and DG ISI
- Sikandar Sultan Raja — Federal Secretary to Govt of Pakistan
- Babar Sattar — judge of the Islamabad High Court
- Khalid Shameem Wynne — former chairman of the Joint Chiefs of Staff Committee
- Muhammad Zakaullah — former chief of naval staff, Pakistan Navy
- Naweed Zaman — rector, National University of Sciences and Technology (Pakistan), ex-commandant, Army IV Corps
- David Headley — terrorist involved in plotting the 2008 Mumbai attacks
- Musadaq Zulqarnain — CEO Interloop

== See also ==
- Army Burn Hall College
- Hasanabdal
- Military College Jhelum
- PAF Public School Sargodha
- Cadet College Swat
