= Sayed Amjad Hussain =

Pakistani-American cardiothoracic surgeon and writer

- Born: January 1, 1937 (age 89); Peshawar, N.W.F.P (now Khyber Pakhtunkhwa), Pakistan
- Education: Khyber Medical College, Peshawar
- Known for: Invention of the pleuroperitoneal shunt; special endotracheal tube to supply oxygen during fiberoptic bronchoscopy in awake patients
- Spouse: Dorothy Hussain
- Children: 3
- Awards: Induction in the Medical Mission Hall of Fame (2012)
- Scientific career
- Fields: Cardiothoracic Surgery, Photography
- Workplaces: University of Toledo College of Medicine

Sayed Amjad Hussain (Urdu:سيد امجد حسين) is a Pakistani-American cardiothoracic surgeon and writer from Maumee, Ohio. He invented two surgical devices – the pleuroperitoneal shunt and a special endotracheal tube. He was a member of Team Indus which covered the entire 2,000 miles of the river Indus in Pakistan from its source in Western Tibet. This trip was claimed to have been the third expedition in history to reach that site. The achievements of Team Indus were entered into Congressional Records of the U.S. Congress in June 1997. While on a humanitarian mission, he donated tons of supplies and equipment to the Dominican Republic, China and Pakistan. Also, his photographs have appeared on 35 magazine covers and in 8 calendars. The Herald Magazine August 2003, introduced Hussain as the jack-of-all-trades and master of many.

He is an emeritus professor of thoracic and cardiovascular surgery in the College of Medicine and Life Sciences and emeritus professor of humanities in the College of Literature, Languages, and Social Sciences at the University of Toledo.

== Early life and education ==
Hussain was born on January 1, 1937, in Peshawar to Agha Sayed Gulbacha. He received his early education from Government High School No. 1, Peshawar, and Islamia College Peshawar. He graduated with distinction from Khyber Medical College Peshawar in 1962. He received general surgery training at the Medical University of Ohio and thoracic and cardiovascular surgery training at Wayne State University in Detroit, Michigan. He was given a fellowship from the Royal College of Surgeons of Canada in 1973 and made a diplomate of the American Board of Thoracic Surgery in 1970. Dr. Hussain was married to the late Dottie Brown Hussain and has three children: Natasha Raabia Hussain, S. Waqaar (Qarie Marshall) Hussain and S. Osman (Monie) Hussain.

== Professional career ==
Hussain returned to Pakistan in 1970 and taught at his alma mater (Khyber Medical College Peshawar) for four years. He came back to the United States in 1975 and began a private practice of cardiothoracic vascular surgery in Toledo. He worked as chief of thoracic and cardiovascular surgery, Lock Haven Hospital, Lock Haven; as chief of the Section of Thoracic and Cardiovascular Surgery, Mercy St. Charles Hospital in Oregon, and now works as the professor emeritus of the Medical University of Ohio, Toledo (now the University of Toledo). He has been visiting professor to Khyber Medical College, Peshawar; University of Garyounus, Benghazi, Libya; Government Medical College, Amritsar, India; University of Alberta, Canada, and University of Beijing, China. in 2020 he was awarded an honorary Doctor of Science (SciD) Degree by the University of Toledo.

== Contributions ==
Hussain is a multifaceted man, and his contributions as a surgeon, researcher, explorer, and photographer have been exemplary. He has authored 50 scientific papers in national and international medical journals. He is an author who has written fourteen books on as diverse a subjects as religion, culture, history, and international relations. He has described several new surgical techniques and has invented two medical devices: the pleura-peritoneal shunt and a special endotracheal tube to supply oxygen during fiberoptic bronchoscopy in awake patients. He has written over four hundred newspaper and magazine articles about history, politics, religion and culture in American and international publications like The Blade, Toledo Magazine, Explorers Journal, Weekly Pakistan Link, The Herald Magazine and various Pakistani News Papers. He is also an op-ed columnist for The Toledo Blade. At the community level, Hussain has helped build the Islamic Center of Greater Toledo, one of the largest Islamic Centers in North America. While on a humanitarian mission, he donated tons of supplies and equipment to the Dominican Republic, China, and Pakistan. He endowed a visiting professorship for Khyber Medical College at The University of Toledo College of Medicine. In 2020 he was invited to address the commencement ceremony of the University of Toledo, College of Medicine and Life Sciences.

== Achievements ==
Dr. Hussain is a member of 17 professional organizations 16 hospitals, 10 administrative positions, various committees,, is a visiting professor to 12 universities throughout the world, and is a member of the editorial board of 6 medical journals. He gave 122 presentations at regional, national, and international meetings, delivered 147 lectures in different colleges and universities of medicine around the world, and appeared in 47 Television Talk shows, interviews, and documentaries.

As an internationally recognized explorer, he founded the Team Indus exploration group which traversed and photographed the entire 2,000 miles of the river Indus in Pakistan during the first three expeditions (in 1987, 1992, and 1994) and the source of the river in western Tibet during the 1996 expedition. This expedition was chronicled as the cover story in the fall 1997 issue of the Explorers Journal. He took part in several photography exhibitions and won 26 prizes. His photographs have appeared on 35 magazine covers and in 8 calendars. 16 of his medical photographs have been published in the Photo Clinic section of "Consultant Magazine". His photographs have also been published in textbooks.

In 1982, Dr. Hussain was appointed by the Government of Pakistan to serve on its Health Policy Panel to formulate the country's Five-Year Health Plan. After his retirement in 2004, he was elevated to the rank of Professor Emeritus by the University of Toledo. In recognition of his many achievements, The University of Toledo established the S. Amjad Hussain Endowed Professorship in Thoracic and Cardiovascular Surgery in 2009.

== Affiliations with organizations ==
Mr. Hussain has been a member of 19 civic and religious organizations and 17 professional organizations and has held more than 20 leadership positions in other organizations which are listed below:

- Member, Adventure Foundation of Pakistan, 1987–present
- Foreign Fellow of Pakistan Academy of Sciences, 2021–present
- Fellow, Explorers Club (USA),1989–present
- President Islamic Center of Greater Toledo, 1985–1986 &1995–1998
- Chairman, board of directors WGTE Public Broadcasting, Toledo, OH 2010–present
- Member, board of directors 1991–2002 Pakistan American Congress
- Founding President 1988–1993 Friends of Pakistan, Toledo, OH
- Editor, Toledo Medicine 1996–present
- Editorial Board, Pakistan Journal of Cardiovascular and Thoracic Surgery 1999–present
- President, Association of Pakistani Physicians of North America 1982–1983
- President, Toledo Surgical Society, Toledo, OH 1990–1991
- Fellow, American College of Surgeons 1972–present
- Member of International Society for Cardiovascular Surgery 1990–present
- Member of International Surgical Society 1991–2002

== Awards and honours ==
For his many activities and accomplishments, Hussain has been recognized by his alma mater, Khyber Medical College, Peshawar; the House and Senate of the State of Ohio, the Medical College of Ohio, the Toledo Surgical Society, the Association of Pakistani Physicians of North America and many other organizations.

Following is the list of awards and honors:

- Roots of Diversity Art Exhibition Arts Commission of Greater Toledo "Midday Lunch in the Fields" First Prize 1993
- The Best Book of 1996–1997 Award and the Abasin Gold Medal for Yuk Shehre Arzoo – 1998
- Selection of his radio play Doctor as one of the seven best plays of the year Radio Pakistan, Peshawar, September 24, 1960
- Lifetime Achievement Award of Khyber Medical College Alumni Association of North America 1992.
- Induction in the Medical Mission Hall of Fame. April 2012
- Lifetime Achievement Award of Khyber Medical College, Peshawar, Pakistan for "Many contributions to his alma mater, his services to Peshawar and Pakistan, November 2005
- Bestowed the title "Baba-e-Peshawar" (Father of Peshawar) by the Governor of Khyber Pakhtunkhwa (NWFP) on behalf of the citizens of Peshawar, Pakistan. December 14, 1998.
- Honored by Khyber Medical College with the title "Farzand-e-Khyber"(The Son of Khyber) December 1993
- Distinguished Service and Excellence Award of the Association of International Physicians for "superb professional achievements", 1986
- Awarded Key to the Golden Door and inducted into the Heritage Hall of Fame of the International Institute for "superb professional achievements", 1986

== See also ==
- University of Toledo College of Medicine
- Khyber Medical College
