= Khyber Medical College =

Public sector medical college located in Peshawar, Pakistan

- د خیبر طبي کالج کالج طبی خیبر
- Motto: Service to Humanity
- Type: Public
- Established: 1954; 72 years ago
- Affiliations: PMDC; KMU; HEC
- Dean: Mehmood Aurangzeb
- Administrative staff: 707
- Students: 1500
- Location: Peshawar, Pakhtunkhwa, Pakistan; 34.00095°N 71.48590°E
- Campus: Urban
- Colors: Crimson and White
- Website: www.kmc.edu.pk

Khyber Medical College (Pashto: د خیبر طبي کالج Urdu: کالج طبی خیبر, abbreviated as KMC) is a public sector medical college located in Peshawar. Khyber Medical College is the oldest medical college of the province of Khyber Pakhtunkhwa and was established in 1954. It is considered as a mother medical institution.

Khyber Medical College is situated inside the University of Peshawar and occupies the site of ancient Buddhist academy. The college offers both undergraduate medical education and teaching and research facilities to postgraduate students (e.g., M. Phil, in basic Medical Sciences, FCPS in Clinical and basic medical sciences, and minor diplomas in many specialties). It is one of several medical schools affiliated with Khyber Medical University and is recognized by PMDC.

== History ==
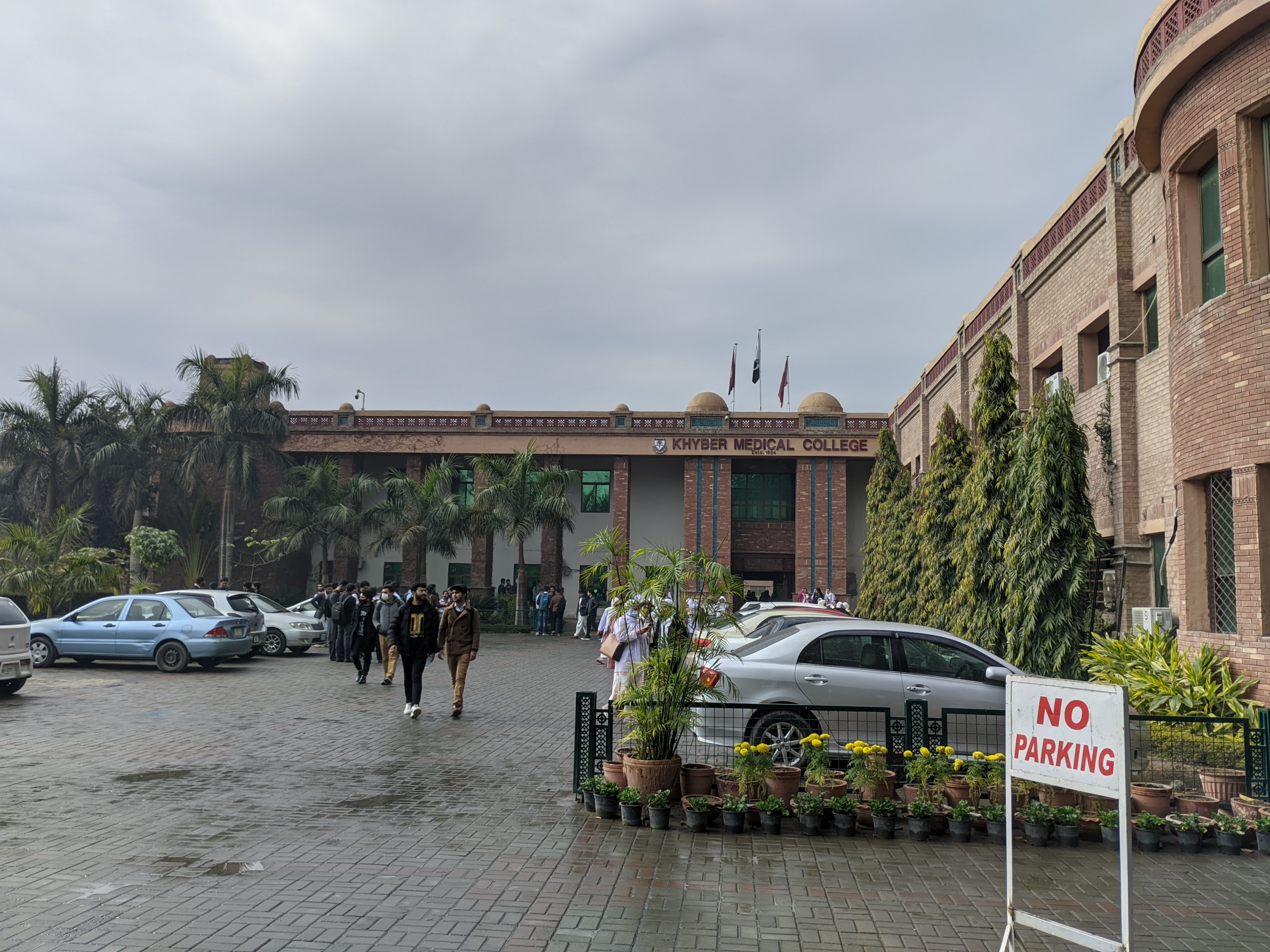
Khyber Medical College on a rainy day

After the creation of Pakistan in 1947, a need was felt for the establishment of a medical school in the North-West Frontier Province. The person who acted upon this need was Monowar Khan Afridi, who collaborated with the Chief Minister of the province, Sardar Abdul Rashid. Both of them decided upon the name "Khyber Medical College" for the proposed medical school. Finally, the foundation stone of the college was laid by the Governor General Malik Ghulam Muhammad on 2 May 1954 with the college beginning to function in 1955 with an enrollment of fifty students and meager facilities.

After establishment, the college was affiliated and run by University of Peshawar, with Monowar Khan Afridi as the Vice-Chancellor. It remained under the administrative control of the health department after parting ways from University of Peshawar in 1975. Presently, the college and hospital have been given administrative and financial autonomy by the Government of Khyber Pakhtunkhwa and are working under the institutional management committee, headed by a Chief Executive.

On 20 December 2023, Prime Minister Anwaar ul Haq Kakar, during a speech to the 46th annual meeting of Association of Physicians of Pakistani Descent of North America (APPNA), announced that the status of KMC would be upgraded to a medical university.

== Admissions ==
Khyber Medical College enrolls 287 students yearly.

== Departments ==
=== Basic Sciences ===
- Anatomy
- Physiology
- Biochemistry
- Pharmacology
- Pathology
- Forensic Medicine
- Community Medicine
- Medical Education

=== Clinical Sciences ===
- Medicine
- Surgery
- Gynaecology/Obstetrics
- Paediatrics
- Ophthalmology
- ENT
- Radiology
- Anesthesia
- Paediatric Surgery
- Plastic Surgery
- Nephrology
- Orthopedics
- Cardiology
- Pulmonology
- Dermatology
- Psychiatry
- Nuclear Medicine

== Library ==
Khyber Medical College library was established in September 1955. It is the biggest and oldest medical library in Khyber Pakhtunkhwa.

== Journals ==
Khyber Medical College has two research journals.

- Journal of Medical Sciences
- Pakistan Medical Students Research Journal

== Attached hospitals ==
- Khyber Teaching Hospital (1976–present)
- Lady Reading Hospital (1955-1976)
- IRNUM

== Alumni ==
=== Alumni association ===
KMCAANA is a 501(c) (3) non-profit alumni of graduates of Khyber Medical College residing in North America. The association has been involved in:

- Training medical staff at hospitals in Peshawar
- Facilitating Malala Yousafzai's medical care in the United States
- Providing scholarships to needy students of the medical school.

=== Notable alumni ===
- Shakil Afridi, helped the CIA confirm the location of Osama bin Laden
- Sania Nishtar - cardiologist, author, activist
- Muhammad Hafizullah - professor of cardiology, former vice chancellor of KMU
- Sayed Amjad Hussain - cardiothoracic surgeon, inventor of pleuroperitoneal shunt and a special endotracheal tube
- A. K. Jamil - anaesthetist, inventor of a non-kink catheter mount used in anaesthesia
- Tariq Saeed Mufti - surgeon and medical academic
- Seema Zia - politician, member of Pakistan Provincial Assembly of Sindh
- Said Alam - pediatric surgeon and political activist
- Zulfiqar Bhutta - Senior Scientist
- Nasim Ashraf - Social Worker
- Omar T. Atiq - American College of Physicians (ACP) President
- Arshad Rehan - President APPNA (2023-2024)

== See also ==
- Khyber Teaching Hospital
- Khyber Medical University
- List of medical schools in Pakistan
