= Muhammad Hafizullah =

Vice Chancellor of Khyber Medical University, Chief Executive of Lady Reading Hospital, Head of cardiology department of Lady Reading Hospital, Peshawar
- Incumbent
- Assumed office 2007 till 2016

Personal details
- Children: 2
- Education: Cadet College Hasan Abdal Khyber Medical College, Peshawar, Royal College of Physicians, UK, American College of Cardiology
- Profession: Cardiologist/Physician
- Website: www.kmu.edu.pk

Muhammad Hafizullah (Urdu: محمد حفیظ الله) is a Pakistani Professor of cardiology who served as Vice Chancellor of Khyber Medical University (KMU) in Peshawar Chief Executive of Lady Reading Hospital and Head of Cardiology Department of Lady Reading Hospital. He is the Project Director and Chairman of the Peshawar Institute of Cardiology and has contributed to national guidelines on thrombolysis, acute coronary syndrome, and ST elevation myocardial infarction developed by the Pakistan Cardiac Society.

== Education and career ==
Hafizullah studied at Cadet College Hasan Abdal, earned his medical degree from Khyber Medical College in 1979, and won Foreign scholarship for the Best Graduates for higher studies in England.

He joined the cardiology department of the Postgraduate Medical Institute at Lady Reading Hospital in Peshawar in 1984. Since then, he has held various positions:

- Vice Chancellor, Khyber Medical University, Peshawar
- Dean, Faculty of Cardiology, College of Physician and Surgeons, Pakistan
- Chief Executive, Lady Reading Hospital, Peshawar (2006-2008)
- Cardiology examiner for the College of Physicians and Surgeons Pakistan (CPSP)
- Governor, Pakistan chapter of American College of Cardiology
- Editor in Chief of Pakistan Heart Journal
- Member of the Faculty of Cardiology, CPSP
- Supervisor for trainees preparing for the CPSP cardiology exam
- Head of the Department of Cardiology, Lady Reading Hospital
- Head of the Department of Cardiology, Hayatabad Medical Complex, Peshawar
- Vice Dean of research, Postgraduate Medical Institute, Lady Reading Hospital
- Project Director, Peshawar Institute of Cardiology
- Member Steering Committee of Assembly of International Governors of American College of Cardiology
- Member Accredition Committee of American College of Cardiology
- Chairman, Board of Governors of Peshawar Institute of Cardiology

Under the umbrella of the Pakistan Cardiac Society, Hafizullah contributed to national guidelines on thrombolysis, acute coronary syndrome, myocardial infarction, stable angina, hypertension, and preventive cardiology. He delivers lectures on preventive cardiology and has written hundreds of articles in leading newspapers and journals.

== Bibliography ==
Hafizullah is the author of eleven books in English:

- Know Thy Heart (2007, Ferozsons)
- Heal Thy Heart (2007, Ferozsons)
- Heart to Heart (2005, Ferozsons)
- My Heart, My Mirror (2010, Ferozsons)
- Musings of Heart (2011, Ferozsons)
- Treasures of Heart (2013, Ferozsons)
- Heart of Heart (2005, Jahangir Book Depot)
- Sagas of Heart (2008, Jahangir)
- Woes of Heart (2013 Ferozsons)
- Ruminations of Heart (2015 Ferozsons)
- Matters of Heart (2018 Ferozsons Ltd
- Heart Awakened 2020 Ferozsons
- Hearts Connected 2022 Ferozsons

He has also written five books in Urdu:

- Dil Ki Dunya (2012, Ferozsons)
- Dil Ki Batain (2012, Ferozsons)
- Dil Kai Khazeenai (2013, Ferozsons)
- Qalb e Muneeb 2020

In addition, he has published more than 450 articles as part of regular newspaper columns: "Know Your Heart" in The Frontier Post, "From the Core of My Heart" in The News International, "Heart to Heart" in The Statesman, "Dil ka Maamla" in Daily Mashriq, and "Dil ki Batain" in Daily Aaj.

== Affiliations ==
Hafizullah became a member of the Royal College of Physicians in 1983, of the Royal Colleges of Physicians of Edinburgh and Glasgow in 1995, and of the American College of Cardiology in 2000. He has also received fellowships from the Society for Cardiac Angiography and Interventions, the Asian Pacific Society of Cardiology, the European Society of Cardiology, the College of Physicians and Surgeons Pakistan, and the American College of Physicians.

Other affiliations and positions include:

- President, Pakistan Cardiac Society
- Ex-Vice President, Pakistan Hypertension League
- Governor, International Society of Cardiovascular Pharmacotherapy
- Ex-Vice President, Asian Pacific Cardiac Society
- Member of Syndicate of the University of Peshawar
- Member of Syndicate of the University of Malakand
- Member of Senate, Shaheed Zulfiqar Ali Bhutto Medical University
- Member of Syndicate of the Kohat University of Science and Technology
- Member of Board of Governors, CECOS University
- Member of Board of Governors, Paraplegic Centre, Peshawar
- Member of National Ethical Board, Pakistan Health Research Council
- Editor in Chief, Pakistan Heart Journal, Pakistan Cardiac Society (since 2011)
- Editor in Chief, Journal of the Postgraduate Medical Institute, Lady Reading Hospital (1993–2009)
- Patron, KMU Journal, Khyber Medical University
- Chairman, Council on Preventive Cardiology, Pakistan Cardiac Society
- Member of Executive Council, Pakistan Medical and Dental Council
- Member of Board of Governors, Air University, Islamabad
- Member of Syndicate of King Edward Medical University

== See also ==
- Khyber Medical University
