= Hugh Catchpole =

British educationist and administrator 1907-1997

- Born: 26 May 1907; Ipswich, Suffolk, England
- Died: 1 February 1997 (aged 89); Islamabad, Pakistan
- Burial place: Cadet College Hasan Abdal, Pakistan
- Education: Ipswich School; Oxford University
- Occupations: Teacher, educationist and administrator
- Known for: Teaching; Founder Principal of Cadet College Hasan Abdal; Principal of Rashtriya Indian Military College, PAF Public School Sargodha and Abbottabad Public School
- Awards: Order of the British Empire (OBE); Most Excellent Order of the British Empire (CBE); Sitara-e-Imtiaz (Star of Excellence) Award by the President of Pakistan in 1979; Hilal-i-Imtiaz (Crescent of Excellence) Award by the President of Pakistan in 2007

Hugh Catchpole CBE HI (26 May 1907 – 1 February 1997) was a British educationist and philanthropist, mostly active in British India, and later India and Pakistan. He was a teacher and administrator in military colleges and schools such as Prince of Wales Royal Indian Military College, Pakistan Air Force School in Sargodha and Abbottabad Public School. He was the founder principal of Cadet College Hasan Abdal. For 5 years of his life, he was in the Royal Army and for over 60 years, he was associated with schools in India and Pakistan.

== Background ==
Hugh Catchpole was born in Ipswich, Suffolk, England on 26 May 1907. He was one of five siblings. His father Henry Catchpole was the head of a building firm in Suffolk. He studied in Ipswich School during his early years and played cricket for Suffolk County XI. Later he studied Modern History at the University of Oxford with a scholarship, which he completed in 1928. He also studied Indian history during his stay in Oxford, which formed his interest to come to British India for a teaching assignment at Prince of Wales Royal Indian Military College (Rashtriya Indian Military College) in Dehradun, India as a teacher in 1928.

He joined the Royal Army in 1941 and was in the army until September 1946. In the military he attained the rank of Captain and taught Urdu to British cadets and in the United Kingdom he interrogated Indian soldiers who had been captured by the German army but managed to escape. He later served a second stint in army from December 1946 to October 1948.

== Students ==
His students include highly ranked officers in the Indian defence forces, the Pakistani defence forces and the Bangladeshi defence forces. These include officers such as Air Marshal Asghar Khan and Air Marshal Nur Khan and Air Marshal Shafique Haider Haider Lateef

== Awards and honours ==
- 1 January 1971 – Officer of the Most Excellent Order of the British Empire (OBE), conferred by Elizabeth II
- 31 December 1980 – Commander of the Most Excellent Order of the British Empire (CBE), conferred by Elizabeth II
- 23 March 1979 – Sitara-e-Imtiaz (Star of Excellence) Award by the President of Pakistan.
- 15 June 2007 – Hilal-i-Imtiaz (Crescent of Excellence) Award, second highest civil award of Pakistan, conferred by General Pervez Musharraf posthumously.

== Hugh Catchpole Memorial English Debate ==
The All India Hugh Catchpole Memorial English Debate is an interschool debate competition in India started by Rashtriya Indian Military College (RIMC) in 2006 and is named after Hugh Catchpole. The debate is conducted on a modified Cambridge pattern. Up to 20 reputed institutions from India participate in this event, and the winners over the years have been schools such as Wynberg Allen School in 2009, La Martiniere (Lucknow) in 2013, St. Joseph's Academy (Dehradun) in 2015 and RIMC in 2012 and 2016.

== See also ==
- The Frank Anthony Memorial All-India Inter-School Debate

== Bibliography ==
- Bikram Singh, Sidharth Mishra (1997). Where Gallantry is Tradition: Saga of Rashtriya Indian Military College. Allied Publishers Limited ISBN 8170236495
