= Designability =

Disability research and design charity in Bath, England

Designability Charity Limited (formerly known as the Bath Institute of Medical Engineering) is a charity and limited company working in the field of human centred design. Its main focus is the research and design of products enabled disabled people to live with greater independence.

== History ==
Designability (formerly known as the Bath Institute of Medical Engineering) was established in 1968 as an independent charity by an inventor and engineer, Bevan Horstmann, and local consultant surgeon, Kenneth Lloyd-Williams. BIME was first situated at St Martin's Hospital in Bath but in 1987 it was moved to the Royal United Hospital (RUH) in Bath.

== Achievements ==
During the last 50 years, Designability has completed 300 projects in various disciplines.

In 1970, Designability created the world's first spring assisted armchair.

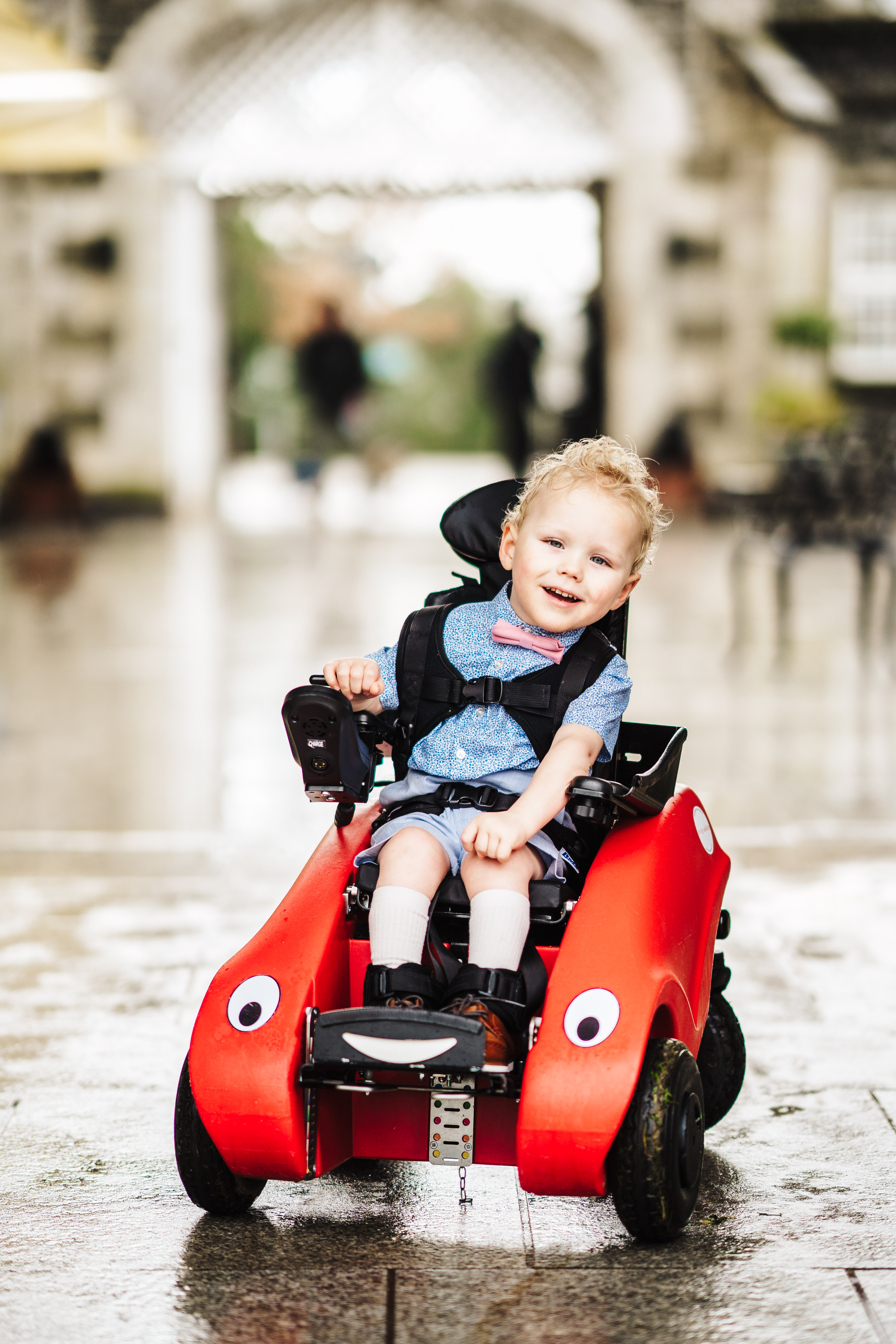
A two-year-old using a Wizzybug powered wheelchair from Designability

In 1990 the original Designability Junior Buggy was developed for young children with limited mobility which led to the creation of the current Wizzybug. The Wizzybug is a powered wheelchair designed for specifically children aged from 14 months and 5 years and aims to support development, independence and socialisation of preschool disabled children.

Designability has previously worked in the field of applying technology to the needs of people with dementia. Designability was the first to design a simple clock, which is helping to dispel confusion for people living with dementia.

Designability was also an active participant in a range of research projects including "Robotics in Care Chiron Project", nutrition in aging, task promoting for dementia and autonomous vehicles for the elderly.

In 2023 the charity was working on an accessible pushchair to enable disabled parents and carers to transport their young children independently.

Designability is also part of a consortium called the National Centre for Accessible Transport which is looking to address and improve the accessibility of transport systems across the UK.

== Funding ==
Designability are funded by 3 income streams, Charitable donations, Research grants and Commercial income from sale of products.

== See also ==
- University of Bath
- Royal United Hospital
