= 1987 Cricket World Cup officials =

The 1987 Cricket World Cup (also known as Reliance World Cup) was the fourth edition of the ICC Cricket World Cup tournament. It was held from October 8 to November 8, 1987, in India and Pakistan — the first held outside England on twenty-one different venues. A total of 27 matches were played in 1987 Cricket World Cup including 2 Semifinals and a Final match.

== Umpires ==
Out of the 12 selected umpires, 4 of them belong to Pakistan, 2 were from England and India each while 1 from Australia, New Zealand, West Indies and Sri Lanka each. The first semifinal was supervised by Dickie Bird and David Shepherd while Tony Crafter and Steve Woodward supervised the second semifinal.

Ram Gupta and Mahboob Shah were elected to supervise the 1987 Cricket World Cup final.

S.No.	Umpire	Country	Matches
1	Mahboob Shah	Pakistan	6
2	David Shepherd	England	6
3	Ram Gupta	India	6
4	V.K. Ramaswamy	India	5
5	Steve Woodward	New Zealand	5
6	Dickie Bird	England	5
7	David Archer	West Indies	5
8	Tony Crafter	Australia	5
9	Khizer Hayat	Pakistan	5
10	PW Vidanagamage	Sri Lanka	4
11	Amanullah Khan	Pakistan	1
12	Khalid Aziz	Pakistan	1
