= 1987 Cricket World Cup Group B =

== Overall ==
Pos	Team	Pld	W	L	T	NR	Pts	RR
1	Pakistan	6	5	1	0	0	20	5.007
2	England	6	4	2	0	0	16	5.140
3	West Indies	6	3	3	0	0	12	5.160
4	Sri Lanka	6	0	6	0	0	0	4.041

Source: ESPNcricinfo, The Age

== Pakistan vs Sri Lanka ==
8 October 1987
Scorecard

Pakistan; 267/6 (50 overs)	v	Sri Lanka; 252 (49.2 overs)
Javed Miandad 103 (100); Ravi Ratnayeke 2/47 (9 overs)		Roshan Mahanama 89 (117); Abdul Qadir 2/30 (10 overs)

Pakistan won by 15 runs
Niaz Stadium, Hyderabad, Pakistan
Umpires: V. K. Ramaswamy (India) and Steve Woodward (New Zealand)
Player of the match: Javed Miandad (Pakistan)

== West Indies vs England ==
9 October 1987
Scorecard

West Indies; 243/7 (50 overs)	v	England; 246/8 (49.3 overs)
Richie Richardson 53 (80); Neil Foster 3/53 (10 overs)		Allan Lamb 67* (68); Carl Hooper 3/42 (10 overs)

England won by 2 wickets
Municipal Stadium, Gujranwala, Pakistan
Umpires: Tony Crafter (Australia) and Ram Gupta (India)
Player of the match: Allan Lamb (England)

== Pakistan vs England ==
12 October 1987
Scorecard

Pakistan; 239/7 (50 overs)	v	England; 221 (48.4 overs)
Saleem Malik 65 (80); Phillip DeFreitas 3/42 (10 overs)		Mike Gatting 43 (47); Abdul Qadir 4/31 (10 overs)

Pakistan won by 18 runs
Pindi Club Ground, Rawalpindi, Pakistan
Umpires: Tony Crafter (Australia) and Ram Gupta (India)
Player of the match: Abdul Qadir (Pakistan)

- Play was abandoned due to rain on 12 October. Reserve day on 13 October used.

== West Indies vs Sri Lanka ==
13 October 1987
Scorecard

West Indies; 360/4 (50 overs)	v	Sri Lanka; 169/4 (50 overs)
Viv Richards 181 (125); Ravi Ratnayeke 2/68 (8 overs)		Arjuna Ranatunga 52 (93); Carl Hooper 2/39 (10 overs)

West Indies won by 191 runs
National Stadium, Karachi, Pakistan
Umpires: V. K. Ramaswamy (India) and Steve Woodward (New Zealand)
Player of the match: Viv Richards (West Indies)

== West Indies vs Pakistan ==
16 October 1987
Scorecard

West Indies; 216 (50 overs)	v	Pakistan; 217/9 (50 overs)
Phil Simmons 50 (57); Imran Khan 4/37 (8.3 overs)		Saleem Yousuf 56 (49); Courtney Walsh 4/40 (10 overs)

Pakistan won by 1 wicket
Gaddafi Stadium, Lahore, Pakistan
Umpires: V. K. Ramaswamy (India) and Steve Woodward (New Zealand)
Player of the match: Saleem Yousuf (Pakistan)

== England vs Sri Lanka ==
17 October 1987
Scorecard

England; 296/4 (50 overs)	v	Sri Lanka; 158/8 (45 overs)
Graham Gooch 84 (100); Ravi Ratnayeke 2/62 (9 overs)		Arjuna Ranatunga 40 (67); John Emburey 2/26 (10 overs)

England won by 108 runs
Arbab Niaz Stadium, Peshawar, Pakistan
Umpires: V. K. Ramaswamy (India) and Steve Woodward (New Zealand)
Player of the match: Allan Lamb (England)

- Rain interrupted Sri Lankan innings. SL's target was reduced to 267 in 45 overs by the Average Run Rate method.

== England vs Pakistan ==
20 October 1987
Scorecard

England; 244/9 (50 overs)	v	Pakistan; 247/3 (49 overs)
Bill Athey 86 (104); Imran Khan 4/37 (9 overs)		Rameez Raja 113 (148); John Emburey 1/34 (10 overs)

Pakistan won by 7 wickets
National Stadium, Karachi, Pakistan
Umpires: Tony Crafter (Australia) and V. K. Ramaswamy (India)
Player of the match: Imran Khan (Pakistan)

== West Indies vs Sri Lanka ==
21 October 1987
Scorecard

West Indies; 236/8 (50 overs)	v	Sri Lanka; 211/8 (50 overs)
Phil Simmons 89 (126); Ravi Ratnayeke 3/41 (10 overs)		Arjuna Ranatunga 86* (100); Patrick Patterson 3/31 (10 overs)

West Indies won by 25 runs
Green Park, Kanpur, India
Umpires: Amanullah Khan and Mahboob Shah (Both Pakistan)
Player of the match: Phil Simmons (West Indies)

== Pakistan vs Sri Lanka ==
25 October 1987
Scorecard

Pakistan; 297/7 (50 overs)	v	Sri Lanka; 184/8 (50 overs)
Saleem Malik 100 (95); Aravinda de Silva 1/37 (6 overs)		Duleep Mendis 58 (65); Abdul Qadir 3/40 (10 overs)

Pakistan won by 113 runs
Iqbal Stadium, Faisalabad, Pakistan
Umpires: Ram Gupta (India) and Steve Woodward (New Zealand)
Player of the match: Saleem Malik (Pakistan)

== England vs West Indies ==
26 October 1987
Scorecard

England; 269/5 (50 overs)	v	West Indies; 235 (48.1 overs)
Graham Gooch 92 (137); Patrick Patterson 3/56 (9 overs)		Richie Richardson 93 (130); Phillip DeFreitas 3/28 (9.1 overs)

England won by 34 runs
Sawai Mansingh Stadium, Jaipur, India
Umpires: Mahboob Shah (Pakistan) and PW Vidanagamage (Sri Lanka)
Player of the match: Graham Gooch (England)

== Sri Lanka vs England ==
30 October 1987
Scorecard

Sri Lanka; 218/7 (50 overs)	v	England; 219/2 (41.2 overs)
Roy Dias 80 (105); Eddie Hemmings 3/57 (10 overs)		Graham Gooch 61 (79); Sridharan Jeganathan 2/45 (10 overs)

England won by 8 wickets
Nehru Stadium, Poona, India
Umpires: David Archer (West Indies) and Khizer Hayat (Pakistan)
Player of the match: Graham Gooch (England)

== West Indies vs Pakistan ==
30 October 1987
Scorecard

West Indies; 258/7 (50 overs)	v	Pakistan; 230/9 (50 overs)
Richie Richardson 110 (135); Wasim Akram 3/45 (10 overs)		Rameez Raja 70 (111); Patrick Patterson 3/34 (10 overs)

West Indies won by 28 runs
National Stadium, Karachi, Pakistan
Umpires: Ram Gupta and V. K. Ramaswamy (both India)
Player of the match: Richie Richardson (West Indies)
