= 1987 Cricket World Cup Group A =

== Overall ==
Pos	Team	Pld	W	L	T	NR	Pts	RR
1	India	6	5	1	0	0	20	5.413
2	Australia	6	5	1	0	0	20	5.193
3	New Zealand	6	2	4	0	0	8	4.887
4	Zimbabwe	6	0	6	0	0	0	3.757

Source: ESPNcricinfo, The Age

== Australia vs India ==
9 October 1987
Scorecard

Australia; 270/6 (50 overs)	v	India; 269 (49.5 overs)
Geoff Marsh 110 (141); Manoj Prabhakar 2/47 (10 overs)		Navjot Sidhu 73 (79); Craig McDermott 4/56 (10 overs)

Australia won by 1 run
MA Chidambaram Stadium, Madras, India
Umpires: David Archer (England) and Dickie Bird (England)
Player of the match: Geoff Marsh (Australia)

Navjot Sidhu (India) and Tom Moody (Aus) made their ODI debuts

== New Zealand vs Zimbabwe ==
10 October 1987
Scorecard

New Zealand; 242/7 (50 overs)	v	Zimbabwe; 239 (49.4 overs)
Martin Crowe 72 (88); Ali Shah 2/42 (9 overs)		David Houghton 142 (137); Willie Watson 2/36 (10 overs)

New Zealand won by 3 runs
Lal Bahadur Shastri Stadium, Hyderabad, India
Umpires: Mahboob Shah (Pakistan) and PW Vidanagamage (Sri Lanka)
Player of the match: David Houghton (Zimbabwe)

== Australia vs Zimbabwe ==
13 October 1987
Scorecard

Australia; 235/9 (50 overs)	v	Zimbabwe; 139 (49.4 overs)
Allan Border 67 (88); Kevin Curran 2/29 (8 overs)		Kevin Curran 30 (38); Simon O'Donnell 4/39 (9.4 overs)

Australia won by 96 runs
MA Chidambaram Stadium, Madras, India
Umpires: Khizer Hayat(Pakistan) and David Shepherd (England)
Player of the match: Steve Waugh (Australia)

== India vs New Zealand ==
14 October 1987
Scorecard

India; 252/7 (50 overs)	v	New Zealand; 236/8 (50 overs)
Navjot Sidhu 75 (71); Dipak Patel 3/36 (10 overs)		Ken Rutherford 75 (95); Maninder Singh 2/40 (10 overs)

India won by 16 runs
M.Chinnaswamy Stadium, Bangalore, India
Umpires: David Archer (West Indies) and Dickie Bird (England)
Player of the match: Kapil Dev (India)

== Zimbabwe vs India ==
17 October 1987
Scorecard

Zimbabwe; 135 (44.2 overs)	v	India; 136/2 (27.5 overs)
Andrew Pycroft 61 (102); Manoj Prabhakar 4/19 (8 overs)		Dilip Vengsarkar 46* (37); John Traicos 2/27 (8 overs)

India won by 8 wickets
Wankhede Stadium, Bombay, India
Umpires: Mahboob Shah (Pakistan) and David Shepherd (England)
Player of the match: Manoj Prabhakar (India)

== Australia vs New Zealand ==
18 October 1987
Scorecard

Australia; 199/4 (30 overs)	v	New Zealand; 196/9 (30 overs)
David Boon 87 (96); Martin Snedden 2/36 (6 overs)		Martin Crowe 58 (48); Steve Waugh 2/36 (6 overs)

Australia won by 3 runs
Nehru Stadium, Indore, India
Umpires: David Archer (West Indies) and Khizer Hayat (Pakistan)
Player of the match: David Boon (Australia)

- No play on 18 October due to rain. Reserve day on 19 October used, further rain reduced match to 30 overs per side.

== India vs Australia ==
22 October 1987
Scorecard

India; 289/6 (50 overs)	v	Australia; 233 (49 overs)
Dilip Vengsarkar 63 (60); Craig McDermott 3/61 (10 overs)		David Boon 62 (59); Mohammad Azharuddin 3/19 (3.5 overs)

India won by 56 runs
Feroz Shah Kotla, Delhi, India
Umpires: Khalid Aziz (Pakistan) and David Shepherd (England)
Player of the match: Mohammad Azharuddin (India)

- Andrew Zesers (Aus) made his ODI debut.

== Zimbabwe vs New Zealand ==
23 October 1987
Scorecard

Zimbabwe; 227/5 (50 overs)	v	New Zealand; 228/6 (47.4 overs)
Andrew Pycroft 52 (46); Stephen Boock 2/43 (10 overs)		Jeff Crowe 88 (105); Ali Shah 2/34 (10 overs)

New Zealand won by 4 wickets
Eden Gardens, Kolkata, India
Umpires: Khizer Hayat (Pakistan) and PW Vidanagamage (Sri Lanka)
Player of the match: Jeff Crowe(New Zealand)

== Zimbabwe vs India ==
26 October 1987
Scorecard

Zimbabwe; 191/7 (50 overs)	v	India; 194/3 (42 overs)
Kevin Arnott 60 (126); Chetan Sharma 2/41 (10 overs)		Navjot Sidhu 55 (61); Peter Rawson 2/46 (8 overs)

India won by 7 wickets
Sardar Patel Stadium, Ahmedabad, India
Umpires: David Archer (West Indies) and Dickie Bird (England)
Player of the match: Kapil Dev (India)

== Australia vs New Zealand ==
27 October 1987
Scorecard

Australia; 251/8 (50 overs)	v	New Zealand; 234 (48.4 overs)
Geoff Marsh 126 (149); Willie Watson 2/46 (8 overs)		John Wright 61 (82); Allan Border 2/27 (7 overs)

Australia won by 17 runs
Sector 16 Stadium, Chandigarh, India
Umpires: Khizer Hayat (Pakistan) and David Shepherd (England)
Player of the match: Geoff Marsh (Australia)

== Australia vs Zimbabwe ==
30 October 1987
Scorecard

Australia; 266/5 (50 overs)	v	Zimbabwe; 196/6 (50 overs)
David Boon 93 (101); John Traicos 2/45 (10 overs)		Andrew Pycroft 38 (46); Tim May 2/30 (10 overs)

Australia won by 70 runs
Barabati Stadium, Cuttack, India
Umpires: Mahboob Shah (Pakistan) and PW Vidanagamage (Sri Lanka)
Player of the match: David Boon (Australia)

== New Zealand vs India ==
31 October 1987
Scorecard

New Zealand; 221/9 (50 overs)	v	India; 224/1 (32.1 overs)
Dipak Patel 40 (51); Chetan Sharma 3/51 (10 overs)		Sunil Gavaskar 103* (88); Willie Watson 1/50 (10 overs)

India won by 9 wickets
Vidarbha Cricket Association Ground, Nagpur, India
Umpires: Dickie Bird (England) and David Shepherd (England)
Player of the match: Sunil Gavaskar and Chetan Sharma (Both India)

- Chetan Sharma (Ind) became the first bowler to take a Hat-Trick in a World Cup Match and he also became the first bowler for India to take a hat-trick in an ODI when he clean bowled Ken Rutherford, Ian Smith and Ewen Chatfield of New Zealand off consecutive balls.
