= Sunil Gavaskar =

Indian cricketer (born 1949)

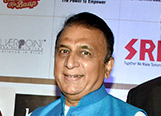
- Gavaskar in 2018

Sheriff of Mumbai
- In office 1995–1996
- Preceded by: I. M. Kadri
- Succeeded by: Subir Kumar Choudhury
- Cricket career

Personal information
- Full name: Sunil Manohar Gavaskar
- Born: 10 July 1949 (age 77); Bombay, Dominion of India
- Nickname: Sunny, Little Master
- Height: 5 ft 4 in (163 cm)
- Batting: Right-handed
- Role: Opening batsman
- Relatives: Madhav Mantri (uncle); Manohar Gavaskar (father); Meenal Gavaskar (mother); Marshneil Gavaskar (wife); Rohan Gavaskar (son); Kavita Vishwanath (sister); Gundappa Viswanath (brother-in-law)

International information
- National side: India (1971–1987)
- Test debut (cap 128): 6 March 1971 v West Indies
- Last Test: 13 March 1987 v Pakistan
- ODI debut (cap 4): 13 July 1974 v England
- Last ODI: 5 November 1987 v England

Domestic team information
- Years: Team
- 1967–1982: Mumbai
- 1980: Somerset

Career statistics
Competition	Test	ODI	FC	LA
Matches	125	108	348	151
Runs scored	10,122	3,092	25,834	4,594
Batting average	51.12	35.13	51.46	36.17
100s/50s	34/45	1/27	81/105	5/37
Top score	236*	103*	340	123
Balls bowled	380	20	1,953	108
Wickets	1	1	22	2
Bowling average	206.00	25.00	56.36	40.50
5 wickets in innings	0	0	0	0
10 wickets in match	0	0	0	0
Best bowling	1/34	1/10	3/43	1/10
Catches/stumpings	108/–	22/–	293/–	37/–
Medal record
Men's Cricket
Representing India
ICC Cricket World Cup
Winner	1983 England and Wales
ACC Asia Cup
Winner	1984 United Arab Emirates
- Source: CricketArchive, 5 September 2008

Sunil Manohar Gavaskar (Marathi pronunciation: [suniːl ɡaːʋəskəɾ]; born 10 July 1949), is an Indian cricket commentator and former cricketer. He captained the Indian national cricket team while representing India and Mumbai from 1971 to 1987. He was the first batsman to pass 10,000 runs in Test cricket. Gavaskar is acknowledged as one of the greatest opening batsmen of all time.

Gavaskar was widely admired for his technique against fast bowling, with a particularly high average of 65.45 against the West Indies, who possessed a four-pronged fast bowling attack, widely regarded as the most vicious in Test history. However, most of Gavaskar's centuries against West Indies were against the team when their four-pronged attack were not playing together. His captaincy of the Indian team, was considered as one of the first attacking ones, with Indian team winning the 1984 Asia Cup, and the World Championship of Cricket in 1985. At the same time, there were multiple exchanges of captaincy between Gavaskar and Kapil Dev, with one coming just six months before Kapil led India to victory at the 1983 Cricket World Cup. He is also a former Sheriff of Mumbai.

Gavaskar is a recipient of the Indian sports honour of the Arjuna Award and the civilian honour of the Padma Bhushan. He was inducted into the ICC Cricket Hall of Fame in 2009. In 2012, he was awarded the C. K. Nayudu Lifetime Achievement Award, the highest honour BCCI can bestow on a former player.

== Domestic debut ==
Born in Bombay in a middle class Marathi Family and a student of St Xavier's High School young Sunil Gavaskar was named India's Best Schoolboy Cricketer of the year in 1966 while playing for his school. He scored 246*, 222 and 85 in school cricket in his final year of secondary education before striking a century against the touring London schoolboys. He made his first-class debut for Vazir Sultan Colts XI against an XI from Dungarpur in 1966–67 but remained in Bombay's Ranji Trophy squad for the next two years without playing a match. An alumnus of Bombay's St. Xavier's College, he made his debut in the 1968–69 season against Karnataka but made a duck and was the subject of derisive claims that his selection was due to the presence of his uncle Madhav Mantri, a former Indian Test wicket keeper on Bombay's selection committee. He responded with 114 against Rajasthan in his second match and two other consecutive centuries saw him being selected in the 1970–71 Indian team to tour the West Indies.

== Test debut ==
=== First test match win in West Indies ===
After missing the first Test due to nail infection, Gavaskar scored 65 and 67 not out in the second Test in Port-of-Spain, Trinidad, hitting the winning runs which gave India its first-ever win over the West Indies.

=== First Test century and first series victory over West Indies ===
He followed this with his first century, 116 and 64* in the third Test in Georgetown, Guyana, and 1 and 117* in the Fourth Test in Bridgetown, Barbados. He returned to Trinidad for the fifth Test and scored 124 and 220 to help India to its first ever series victory over the West Indies, and the only one until 2006. His performance in the Test made him the second player after Doug Walters to score a century and double century in the same match. He remained the only Indian to achieve this feat until Shubman Gill repeated it against England at Edgbaston in July 2025. He also became the first Indian to make four centuries in one Test series, the second Indian after Vijay Hazare to score two centuries in the same Test, and the third after Hazare and Polly Umrigar to score centuries in three consecutive innings. He was the first Indian to aggregate more than 700 runs in a series and until date remains the only Indian to do so. This 774 runs at 154.80 also remains the most runs scored in a debut series by any batsman. Trinidad Calypso singer Lord Relator (Willard Harris) wrote a song in Gavaskar's honour, the "Gavaskar Calypso".

=== England tour ===
Gavaskar's arrival in England in 1971 for a three-Test series generated substantial publicity in light of his debut series. He was unable to maintain his performance, making only two half-centuries. He was involved in controversy when taking a quick single from the bowling of John Snow. They collided, and Gavaskar fell over. Snow was charged with deliberately barging into Gavaskar and was suspended. Gavaskar's 144 runs at the low average of 24, led some to question Gavaskar's worthiness for international cricket.

=== England tour of India ===
In 1972–73, England toured India for a five-Test series, Gavaskar's first on home soil. He was ineffective in the first three Tests, accumulating only sixty runs in five innings as India took a 2–1 lead. He scored some runs in the final two Tests which India drew to complete consecutive series wins over England. His first home series was largely disappointing, aggregating 224 runs at 24.89. His English critics were placated when India returned in 1974 and Gavaskar scored 101 and 58 in the first Test at Old Trafford. He managed 227 runs at 37.83 as India were whitewashed 3–0.

=== West Indies tour ===
Gavaskar's 1974–75 series against the West Indies was interrupted, playing in only the First and fifth and final Test of the series against the West Indies. He scored 108 runs at 27, with an 86 bowled by Lance Gibbs at Bombay's Wankhede Stadium hosting the first test on this ground, the closest the Indian public got to see a century. The Test was the start of a world record streak of 106 Test appearances.

The 1975–76 season saw three and four Test tours of New Zealand and the West Indies, respectively. Gavaskar led India in a Test for the first time in January 1976 against New Zealand during the First Test in Auckland when regular captain Bishen Singh Bedi was suffering from a leg injury. Standing in despite having scored only 703 runs at 28.12 since his debut series, Gavaskar rewarded the selectors with 116 and 35*. As a result, India secured an eight-wicket victory. He ended the series with 266 runs at 66.33. On the West Indian leg of the tour, Gavaskar scored consecutive centuries of 156 and 102 in the Second and Third Tests, both in Port of Spain, Trinidad. These were his third and fourth centuries at the grounds. In the Third Test, his 102 helped India post 4/406 to set a world record for the highest winning fourth innings score. The Indians' mastery of the Caribbean spinners on a turning track reportedly led West Indian captain Clive Lloyd to vow that he would rely on pace alone in future Tests. Gavaskar totalled 390 runs at 55.71 for the series.

=== First home test century ===
Gavaskar was not to score a century on home soil until November 1976. In an eight-Test season, three and five against New Zealand and England, respectively, Gavaskar scored centuries in the first and last Tests of the season. The first was 119 in front of his home crowd at the Wankhede Stadium, helping India to a victory. Gavaskar scored another half-century in the Second Test to end the series with 259 at 43.16. In the First Test against England at Delhi, he was mobbed upon becoming the first Indian to reach 1,000 Test runs in a calendar year. A steady series saw him finish with 394 runs at 39.4 with a century coming in the Fifth Test and two half-centuries.

=== Tour of Australia ===
In 1977–78 he toured Australia, scoring three consecutive Test centuries (113, 127, 118) in the second innings of the first three Tests at Brisbane, Perth and Melbourne, respectively. India won the third but lost the earlier two. He finished the Five Test series with 450 runs at 50, failing twice as India lost the final Test and the series 3–2.

=== India Tour of Pakistan ===
1978–79 saw India tour Pakistan for the first series between the arch-rivals for 17 years. For the first time, Gavaskar faced Pakistani pace spearhead Imran Khan, who described him as "The most compact batsman I've bowled to." Gavaskar scored 89 in the First Test and 97 in the Second, which India drew and lost, respectively. Gavaskar saved his best for the Third Test in Karachi, scoring 111 and 137 in the Third, but was unable to prevent a defeat and series loss. His twin centuries made him the first Indian to score two centuries in one Test on two occasions, and saw him pass Umrigar as India's leading Test run-scorer. Gavaskar finished the series with 447 runs at 89.40.

== Captaincy ==
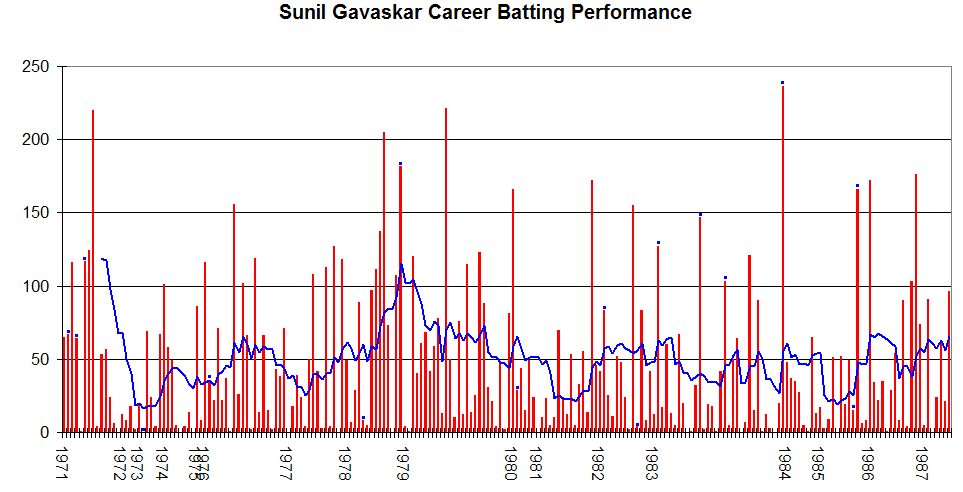
Sunil Gavaskar's career performance graph.

Gavaskar was captain of the Indian team on several occasions in the late 1970s and early 1980s, although his record is less than impressive. Often equipped with unpenetrative bowling attacks he tended to use conservative tactics which resulted in a large number of draws. During his tenure, Kapil Dev emerged as a leading pace bowler for the country. He captained India to nine victories and eight losses, but most of the games were drawn, 30.

=== First test series as a captain ===
His first series in charge was a West Indian visit to India for a six Test series. Gavaskar's several large centuries contrasted with several failures. His 205 in the First Test made him the first Indian to score a double century in India against the West Indies. He added a further 73 in the second innings of a high scoring draw. After failing to score in the Second Test, he scored 107 and 182 not out in the Third Test at Calcutta, another high scoring draw. This made him the first player in Test history to achieve centuries in both innings of a Test three times. He managed only 4 and 1 in the Fourth Test in Madras as India forced the only win of the series. He posted a fourth century for the series, scoring 120 in the Fifth Test at Delhi, becoming the first Indian to pass 4000 Test runs. He aggregated 732 runs at 91.50 for the series, securing India a 1–0 win in his first series as captain.

=== Stripped of the captaincy ===
Despite this, he was stripped of the captaincy when India toured England in 1979 for a four Test tour. The official reason given was that Srinivas Venkataraghavan was preferred due to his superior experience on English soil, but most observers believed that Gavaskar was punished because he was believed to be considering defecting to World Series Cricket. He started consistently, scoring four half-centuries in five innings of the first three Tests. It was in the Fourth Test at The Oval that he produced his finest innings on English soil. India was 1–0 down needed to reach a world record target of 438 to square the series. They reached 76/0 at stumps on the fourth day. Led by Gavaskar, India made steady progress to be 328/1 with 20 overs remaining on the final day with a record-breaking victory still possible. An Ian Botham led fightback saw Gavaskar removed, with India still needing 49 runs from 46 balls. With three balls left in the match, all four results were possible. India ended nine runs short with two wickets in hand when stumps were drawn. According to Sanjay Manjrekar, it was "Vintage Gavaskar, playing swing bowling to perfection, taking his time initially and then opening up. Nothing in the air, everything copybook." He ended the series with 542 runs at 77.42 and was named as one of the Wisden Cricketers of the Year.

=== Restored to captaincy ===
Gavaskar was restored to the captaincy for the gruelling 1979–80 season, with six Test home series against both Australia and Pakistan. The first two Tests against Australia were high scoring draws where only 45 wickets fell, with India taking a first-innings lead in both after making scores over 400. India broke through for a 153-run win in the Third Test at Kanpur, where Gavaskar scored 76. He made 115 in the Fourth Test in Delhi, where India were unable to convert a 212-run first innings lead, resulting in a draw. After another stalemate in the Fifth Test, Gavaskar scored 123 in the Sixth Test, where Australia collapsed by an innings after India posted their fourth first innings in excess of 400 for the series. The series against Pakistan was similarly high scoring, with four draws, three of which did not reach the fourth innings. India won the Third and Fifth Tests in Bombay and Madras. At Madras, he made 166 in the first innings and was unbeaten on 29 when India brought up the winning runs. Having secured the series 2–0, Gavaskar was removed from the captaincy for the drawn Sixth Test. This occurred because Gavaskar had refused to tour the West Indies for another series immediately afterwards, asking for a rest. As a result, Gundappa Viswanath was appointed so that he could prepare his leadership skills for the tour. In the end the tour did not go ahead as the West Indian board were not interested in a team without Gavaskar. The season ended with a one-off Test against England in Bombay, which India lost. In the 13 Tests that season, he made 1027 runs at 51.35 with three centuries and four half-centuries. This ended a 14-month span in which Gavaskar played in 22 Tests and the 1979 Cricket World Cup. In that time, he scored 2301 Test runs including eight centuries.

=== Australian Tour ===
The 1980–81 season saw Gavaskar returned as captain for the Australasian tour, but it was to be the start of an unhappy reign for Gavaskar and India. He managed only 118 runs at 19.66 in the three Tests against Australia, but his impact in Australia was for a controversial incident. At the Melbourne Cricket Ground, when Gavaskar was given out by the Australian umpire Rex Whitehead, he ordered his fellow opener Chetan Chauhan off the field. Instead of abandoning the match, the Indian manager, SK Durani persuaded Chauhan to return to the match which India went on to win by 59 runs as Australia collapsed to 83 in their second innings. India drew the series 1–1 but the following three-Test series in New Zealand was to signal the start of a barren run of 19 Tests under Gavaskar of which India were to win only one and lose five. India lost to New Zealand 1–0, with Gavaskar managing 126 runs at 25.2. He finished the Oceania tour with 244 runs at 22.18, with only two half-centuries, making little impact.

=== England in India ===
The 1981–82 Indian season saw a hard-fought 1–0 series win over England in six Tests. India took the First Test, before five consecutive draws resulted, four of which did not even reach the fourth innings. Gavaskar made 172 in the Second Test at Bangalore and reached a half-century on three further occasions to compile 500 runs at 62.5. India reciprocated England's visit in 1982 for a three-Test series, which was lost 1–0. Gavaskar made 74 runs at 24.66 but was unable to bat in the Third Test.

=== Sri Lanka Tour ===
The 1982–83 subcontinental season started well for Gavaskar on an individual note, as he made 155 in a one-off Test against Sri Lanka in Madras. It was the first Test between the two nations, with Sri Lankan having only recently been awarded Test status. Despite this, India were unable to finish off their novice opponents, the draw heralding a start of a winless summer. India played in twelve Tests, losing five and drawing seven. The first series was a six Test tour to Pakistan. India started well enough, drawing the First Test in Lahore, with Gavaskar scoring 83. Pakistan then defeated India in three consecutive matches. In the Third Test in Faisalabad, Gavaskar managed an unbeaten 127 in the second innings to force Pakistan into a run chase, but the other two losses were substantial, both by an innings. Despite holding on for draws in the last two Tests, Gavaskar was replaced by Kapil Dev as captain after the 3–0 loss. Despite his team's difficulties, Gavaskar remained productive with 434 runs at 47.18 with a century and three half centuries. Gavaskar went on to the West Indies for a five Test tour purely as a batsman, but could not reproduce the form that he had shown in the Caribbean in 1971 and 1976. He managed only 240 runs at 30, as India were crushed 2–0 by the world champions. Apart from an unbeaten 147 in the drawn Third Test in Georgetown, Guyana, his next best effort was 32.

The 1983–84 season started with a home series against Pakistan, with all three matches being drawn. Gavaskar scored an unbeaten 103 in the First Test in Bangalore, and made two further half centuries to total 264 runs at 66.

=== Overtaking Bradman's test record ===
The Pakistan series was followed by a six Test series against the touring West Indies at the height of their powers. The First Test was held in Kanpur and India were crushed by an innings. Gavaskar had his bat knocked out of his hand by a hostile delivery from Malcolm Marshall before being dismissed. In the Second Test in Delhi, Gavaskar delivered his riposte to Marshall, hooking him for a consecutive four and six to start his innings. Gavaskar, unwilling to be dictated to by the Caribbean pacemen, hooked the short-pitched barrage relentlessly, reaching his half century in 37 balls. He then went on to score 121, his 29th Test century in 94 balls in his 95th test match, equalling Don Bradman's world record. He also passed 8,000 Test runs in the innings, and was personally honoured by Indira Gandhi, the Prime Minister of India at the ground. The match was drawn. Gavaskar's 90 in the Third Test at Ahmedabad saw him pass Geoff Boycott's Test world record of 8,114 career runs, but was insufficient to prevent another defeat. During the Fifth Test in the series, India were defeated by an innings at Calcutta to concede a 3–0 series lead. India had won only one of their 32 most recent Tests and none of their last 28. The crowd singled out Gavaskar, who had made a golden duck and 20. Angry spectators pelted objects onto the playing arena and clashed with police, before stoning the team bus. In the Sixth Test in Madras, he compiled his 30th Test century in his 99th test match, with an unbeaten 236 which was the highest Test score by an Indian. It was his 30th Test century and third double century against the West Indies, propelling him to overtake Donald Bradman's 29 test centuries record. He scored a total of 505 runs at an average of 50.50 for the series.

=== Failure to win for successive Tests ===
With India having failed to win for 29 successive Tests, Kapil was sacked as captain and Gavaskar resumed leadership at the start of the 1984–85 season. The two Test tour of Pakistan resulted in two further draws, with Gavaskar compiling 120 runs at 40. The First Test against England saw India break through for its first Test victory in 32 matches. It proved to be a false dawn, with England squaring the series 1–1 in Delhi before another controversial Third Test at Eden Gardens in Calcutta. The hostile crowd watched as India batted for over two days to reach 7/437 after 203 overs. Angry with the slow pace of India's innings, the crowd chanted "Gavaskar down! Gavaskar out!" blaming him for India' performance. The local police chief reportedly asked Gavaskar to declare to placate the angry crowd. When Gavaskar led his team onto the field, he was pelted with fruit.

Gavaskar vowed never to play at Eden Gardens again, and duly withdrew from the team for India's next fixture at the Bengali capital two years later, ending his record of 106 consecutive Tests. The match was drawn, but India conceded the series after losing the Fourth. The series ended 1–2, and with a poor display of 140 runs at 17.5, Gavaskar resigned, although he had already announced his intention to relinquish the leadership before the series. The change of captain improved the form of neither Gavaskar nor India as they toured Sri Lanka for a three-Test series. India were embarrassed 1–0 by the Test minnows at the time, with Gavaskar managing only 186 runs at 37.2.

== International farewell ==
In 1985–86, India toured Australia. All three Tests were drawn. Gavaskar scored an unbeaten 166 in the First Test in Adelaide and 172 in the Third Test in Sydney, ending the series with 352 runs at 117.33. A three-Test tour of England saw him score only 185 runs at 30.83, which India won 2–0 despite his lack of production. In 1986–87, Gavaskar's final season in Test cricket, India faced a long season of eleven home Tests. Against an Australian team, Gavaskar made 90 in the second innings of the First Test in Madras (now Chennai), giving India a chance to reach the target of 348, which ended in a tie. He scored 103 in the Third Test to end the series with 205 runs at 51.66. The First Test against Sri Lanka in Kanpur saw Gavaskar's 34th and final Test century of 176. He scored 74 and 5 in the next two Tests as India won the three-match series 2–0. The five-Test series against arch enemies Pakistan was to be his last. Gavaskar scored 91 in the drawn First Test in Madras before withdrawing from the Second Test in Calcutta as he had promised. In the Fourth Test in Ahmedabad, Gavaskar's 63 made him the first batsman to pass 10,000 runs. With the teams locked 0–0 leading into the final Test in Bangalore, there was to be no fairytale. Gavaskar was dismissed for 96 in the second innings as India were bowled out to give Pakistan a 1–0 series win.

Gavaskar rounded out his international career with the 1987 Cricket World Cup. He scored 300 runs at an average of 50 at the tournament. Against New Zealand in the league phase he recorded his highest ODI score of 103*. The good form however did not continue into the semifinals where Phil Defreitas bowled him for 4 runs in his last international innings.

== Style ==
Gavaskar was also a fine slip fielder and his safe catching in the slips helped him become the first Indian (excluding wicket-keepers) to take over a hundred catches in Test matches. In one ODI against Pakistan in Sharjah in 1985, he took four catches and helped India defend a small total of 125. Early in his Test career, when India rarely used pace bowlers, Gavaskar also opened the bowling for a short spell on occasions if only one pace bowler was playing, before a three-pronged spin attack took over. The only wicket claimed by him is that of Pakistani Zaheer Abbas in 1978–79.

While Gavaskar could not be described as an attacking batsman, he had the ability of keeping the scoreboard ticking with unique shots such as the "late flick". His focus of technical correctness over flair meant that his style of play was usually less suited to the shorter form of the game, at which he had less success. His infamous 36 not out in the 1975 World Cup, carrying his bat through the full 60 overs against England, led Indian supporters to storm the field and confront him for scoring so slowly when India needed nearly a run a ball to win; at the end of the game India had lost only three wickets but scored 200 runs less than England. Gavaskar almost went through his career without scoring a one-day century. He managed his first (and only) ODI century in the 1987 World Cup, when he hit 103 not out in 88 balls against New Zealand in his penultimate ODI innings at Vidarbha Cricket Association Ground, Nagpur.

== Records and achievements ==
- Gavaskar was the first Test cricket player to make over 10,000 runs.
- He held the record for the highest number of test centuries (34) before Sachin Tendulkar went past him in 2005.
- As opening batsman with a batting average above fifty, he is still holding those two test cricket records (runs and centuries). howstat.com (Retrieved October 5, 2024).
- As a batsman, he is the unique yearly aggregate record holder of test runs and centuries, with a half-century to century conversion rate above forty three per cent (since 1983). howstat.com (Retrieved 10/5/2024).
- He has scored the highest runs (774) in a series as a debutant.
- He has scored the most runs by any player in a series (774) against West Indies.
- He has the maximum no. of runs & centuries scored by a player against West Indies—2,749 runs & 13 centuries.
- He is the only cricketer to score 4 consecutive centuries at 2 venues — Port of Spain & Wankhede Stadium.
- He is the only cricketer with Test century partnerships with 18 different players.
- He is a joint holder of the record for scoring centuries in both innings of a Test Match on three occasions along with Australia's Ricky Ponting and David Warner.
- He also became the first Indian fielder (excluding wicket-keepers) to get over a hundred catches in Test cricket.
- He captained the national team on and off over a period between 1978 and 1985, which included a great 2–0 win over Pakistan in 1979–80.
- He is the first Indian cricketer to carry his bat in test cricket, with a score of 127 not out in the Faisalabad Test in the year 1983.
- He was named one of the Wisden cricketers of the year in 1980.

== Important statistics ==
- Test debut: West Indies v India at Port of Spain, 6–10 March 1971
- Last Test: India v Pakistan at Bangalore, 13–17 March 1987
- ODI debut: England v India at Leeds, 13 July 1974
- Last ODI: India v England at Bombay, 5 November 1987
- First-class span: 1966–1987
- First Class Debut: Vazir Sultan Colt's XI v Dungarpur XI at Hyderabad, 1966–67
- Last First Class Match: Rest of the World v M.C.C. at Lord's, 1987
- Wisden Cricketer of the Year 1980
- List A span: 1973–1988
- Gavaskar's 100s in first class cricket.
  1. Tests: 34,
  2. Ranji Trophy: 20,
  3. Irani Cup: 3,
  4. Duleep Trophy: 6,
  5. Rest of the World against England (his last first class game): 1,
  6. County cricket for Somerset: 2,
  7. Other games: 15.

Sachin Tendulkar equalled Sunil Gavaskar's record of first class 100s on 8 February 2013

- Gavaskar was the first cricketer to play 100 consecutive test matches.

== After playing career ==
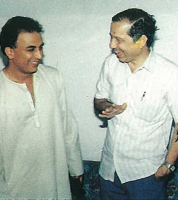
Gavaskar with former BCCI vice-president Dnyaneshwar Agashe.

After retirement, he has been a popular commentator both on TV and in print. In 1987, he participated in Prince Edward of the United Kingdom's charity television special The Grand Knockout Tournament. In 2003, he became the first Indian to deliver the MCC Spirit of Cricket Cowdrey Lecture. He also served as an advisor to the India national cricket team during the home series against Australia in 2004. He was the Chairman of the ICC cricket committee until the time he was forced to choose between commenting and being on the committee. He left the committee to continue his career as a broadcaster.

The inaugural Mansur Ali Khan Pataudi Memorial Lecture was given by Gavaskar on 20 February 2013 at Taj Coromandel, Chennai.

On 28 March 2014 the Supreme Court of India appointed Gavaskar as the interim President of the BCCI, primarily to oversee the seventh Season of the Indian Premier League. At the same time the Court directed him to give up his job as a commentator.

Gavaskar joined Triton Solar as its Brand Ambassador.

== Entertainment career ==
Gavaskar also tried his hand at acting on the silver screen. He played the lead role in the Marathi movie "Savli Premachi". The movie did not receive much appreciation though. After many years he appeared in a guest role in (1988) Hindi movie "Maalamaal". with Naseeruddin Shah and Satish Shah. He has sung a Marathi song "Ya Duniyemadhye Thambayaala Vel Konala" which was written by noted Marathi lyricist Shantaram Nandgaonkar. The song depicted the similarities between a cricket match and real life.

== Honours ==
- In 1980, Gavaskar received the Padma Bhushan award for his successful international cricket career, from President Neelam Sanjiva Reddy.
- On 22 December 1994, Gavaskar was sworn in as Sheriff of Bombay—an honorary post, for a year, at Raj Bhavan in Mumbai in the presence of Governor P. C. Alexander and Chief minister Sharad Pawar.
- In 1996, the Border–Gavaskar Trophy for the bilateral test series between India and Australia was instituted in honour of him and Allan Border. Both these players scored more than 10,000 runs in their respective Test careers and captained their teams.
- "Gavaskar Stadium" in his home district of Vengurla has been named after him.
- In 2003, he became the first Indian cricketer to deliver the MCC Spirit Of Cricket Cowdrey Lecture. He was the 3rd lecturer in the history of the Cowdrey lecture.
- On 21 November 2012, Gavaskar was conferred with BCCI's prestigious Col. C. K. Nayudu Lifetime Achievement Award at the BCCI Annual Awards Function 2011–12. The Lifetime Achievement Award given to Gavaskar carried a citation, trophy and a cheque for ₹25 lakh (equivalent to ₹51 lakh or US$55,000 in 2026) and he received this award from then BCCI president N. Srinivasan.
- On 15 October 2017, Gavaskar inaugurated a cricket field in Louisville in the state of Kentucky in United States, thus making it the first international sporting facility named after an Indian sportsperson. The "Sunil M. Gavaskar Cricket Field", serves as the home ground for the Louisville Cricket Club, which is part of the 42-team MidWest Cricket League. Gavaskar was presented the keys of the ground by Louisville Mayor Greg Fischer.

== Written works ==
Sunil Gavaskar has written several books, including autobiographies and commentaries on the history of cricket. . In 1999, he released The Sunil Gavaskar Omnibus, which collects Sunny Days, Idols, and One Day Wonders, three of his autobiographical works. He has also been a columnist for several newspapers.

- Gavaskar, Sunil (1976). Sunny Days: An Autobiography. Mumbai: Rupa Publications. ISBN 9788129118011.
- Gavaskar, Sunil (1983). Idols. London: Allen & Unwin. ISBN 9780047960918.
- Gavaskar, Sunil (1984). Runs 'n Ruins. Mumbai: Rupa Publications. ASIN B0DLT5PM3N.
- Gavaskar, Sunil (1986). One Day Wonders. Mumbai: Rupa Publications. ISBN 9788171674015.
- Gavaskar, Sunil (1999). The Sunil Gavaskar Omnibus. Mumbai: Rupa Publications. ISBN 9788171674015.
- Gavaskar, Sunil (2009). Straight Drive. Mumbai: Rupa Publications. ISBN 9788129114976.
- Gavaskar, Sunil (2010). Khel aur Khiladi (in Hindi). Mumbai: Prabhat Prakashan. ISBN 9788173158155.

== Controversies ==
Gavaskar has faced multiple controversies and including some big ones in 2025–2026. Mostly against Pakistani players.

=== 2008 Controversy(s) ===
On 25 March 2008, Malcolm Speed, ICC chief executive, told Gavaskar "very clearly", during a meeting between the two at Dubai, that he would have to quit his post at the ICC if he failed to give up his job of commentator and newspaper columnist, in which capacity he has frequently criticised his employers and levelled serious accusations of racism.

He sparked a controversy in early 2008 for his comments on the contentious Sydney Test match: "Millions of Indians want to know if it (match referee Mike Procter's verdict against Harbhajan Singh) was a 'white man' taking the 'white man's' word against that of the 'brown man'. Quite simply, if there was no audio evidence, nor did the officials hear anything, then the charge did not stand". Despite the fact that Gavaskar's comment referenced Mike Procter and not the ICC, Australian writer Gideon Haigh said that, if Gavaskar genuinely believed this, "then he should almost certainly resign, for if the ICC is a bastion of 'white man's justice', Gavaskar bears some of the blame for having failed to change it".

=== Key 2026 Controversy ===
Zee News reported that Gavaskar stated income tax from Pakistani players' earnings in leagues like The Hundred is used by the Pakistan government to fund terrorism, arguing Indian-owned entities should not be paying them, regardless of whether it is an overseas subsidiary. The criticism was directed at the YouTube video about the controversy Sunrisers Leeds (formerly Northern Superchargers) franchise in The Hundred for signing Abrar Ahmed for GBP 190,000.

As reported by Hindustan Times, critics alleged falsity, citing his own work for international boards, which he defended by stating he is not paid directly by Indian entities in those roles, notes The Times of India.

Gavaskar's comments caused a massive unexpected reputation damage for the franchise, leading to intense online debate and calls for boycotts of Indian-owned teams that hire Pakistani talent.

=== Babar Azam Controversy ===
According to a Facebook post, Gavaskar was criticized for roasting Pakistani cricketer Babar Azam by saying, "Babar Azam is a great batsman. He just needs a good coach who can advise him to retire".

=== Gautam Gambhir Controversy ===
A YouTube video of his comments states that he questioned why people were not giving former Indian coach Gautam Gambhir credit for previous wins while blaming him for recent poor performances most specifically and significantly a 0–2 loss against South Africa national cricket team in a Test Series in November 2025.

=== India-Pak Handshakes Controversy ===
A YouTube video of his comments mention his view that Indian players defending the Indian cricket team's decision not to shake hands with Pakistani players during the 2025 Asia Cup, stating that "if opponents are abusive on the field, a handshake cannot be expected."

Following the incident, Pakistan skipped the post-match presentation, which Gavaskar criticized, emphasizing that teams should not avoid mandatory media obligations.

== Personal life ==
Born in a Marathi speaking Brahmin family to Meenal (née Mantri) & Manohar Gavaskar, Gavaskar is married to Marshneill Gavaskar (née Mehrotra), daughter of a leather industrialist from Kanpur. Their son, Rohan, born in Kanpur, was also a cricketer who played 11 One Day Internationals for India, but could not cement his spot in the team. Rohan was given the name "Rohan Jaivishwa" by his father as a tribute to his 3 favourite cricketers—Rohan Kanhai; M. L. Jaisimha; and Rohan's uncle, Gundappa Vishwanath—although his name is usually recorded as Rohan Sunil Gavaskar.

As per his autobiography, "Sunny Days", in his own version, Sunil Gavaskar stated that he was exchanged with a fisherman's baby at birth. It was his uncle who spotted that the child was not Sunil as he had a birthmark near his ear. "Perhaps, I would have grown up to be an obscure fisherman, toiling somewhere along the west coast," Gavaskar wrote.

His maternal uncle was retired Indian cricketer Madhav Mantri. His sister Kavita Viswanath is married to cricketer Gundappa Viswanath. His other sister—Nutan Gavaskar was the honorary general secretary of Women's Cricket Association of India (WCAI).

According to a recollection by his son Rohan, Gavaskar saved a Muslim family from a violent mob during the 1993 Bombay riots. “We were standing on our terrace right after the bomb blasts, a few days later, when we saw a hate mob, and they had cornered a family. We knew they did not have any good intentions towards the family and dad saw that, ran down and confronted the hate mob. He told the mob, ‘whatever you are going to do that family, you are going to do to me first’, and then better sense prevailed and the family was allowed to go its way."

Gavaskar is an ardent devotee of Sathya Sai Baba.

== In popular culture ==
The 2021 film 83 features Tahir Raj Bhasin as Gavaskar.

== See also ==
- List of international cricket centuries by Sunil Gavaskar
- List of cricketers who have scored centuries in both innings of a Test match

== Sources ==
- Brown, Alex. "Gavaskar slams 'white man' ban." The Age, 14 January 2008.
- Haigh, Gideon. "Gavaskar's double role." Cricinfo. 15 January 2008. (Retrieved 22 November 2008).

Sporting positions
Preceded by Nawab of Patudi Jr.	Indian National Test Cricket Captain; 1975/76 (1 Test Match)	Succeeded by Bishen Singh Bedi
Preceded by Bishen Singh Bedi	Indian National Test Cricket Captain; 1978/79 – 1979	Succeeded by Srinivasaraghavan Venkataraghavan
Preceded by Srinivasaraghavan Venkataraghavan	Indian National Test Cricket Captain; 1979/80	Succeeded by Gundappa Viswanath
Preceded by Gundappa Viswanath	Indian National Test Cricket Captain; 1980/81 – 1982–83	Succeeded by Kapil Dev
Preceded by Kapil Dev	Indian National Test Cricket Captain; 1984/85	Succeeded by Kapil Dev
