= Vidanagamage =

Vidanagamage is a surname. Notable people with the surname include:

- Amith Thenuka Vidanagamage (born 1973), Sri Lankan politician,
- P. W. Vidanagamage (1934–2013), Sri Lankan cricket umpire
