= Eddie Hemmings =

Eddie Hemmings may refer to:

- Eddie Hemmings (cricketer) (born 1949), former England cricketer
- Eddie Hemmings (rugby league), British rugby league television presenter
