= 1987 Cricket World Cup knockout stage =

This page describes the Knockout stage matches of 1987 CWC.

== Knockout stage ==
In 1987 Cricket World Cup, the first semi-final was played between Pakistan and Australia at the Gaddafi Stadium, Lahore, on 4 November 1987; Australia won by 18 runs. In the second semi-final England defeated India by 35 runs at the Wankhede Stadium, Mumbai, on 5 November 1987. Australia and England met in the Final on 8 November 1987 at Eden Gardens, Kolkata, with Australia winning the trophy by 7 runs.

Semi-finals
November 4 – Gaddafi Stadium, Lahore, Pakistan
A2 Australia	267/6
B1 Pakistan	249
November 5 – Wankhede Stadium, Bombay, India
B2 England	254/6
A1 India	219

Final
November 8 – Eden Gardens, Calcutta, India
Australia	253/5
England	246/8

== Semi-finals ==
=== Australia vs Pakistan ===
4 November 1987
Scorecard

Australia; 267/6 (50 overs)	v	Pakistan; 249 (49 overs)
David Boon 65 (91); Imran Khan 3/36 (10 overs)		Javed Miandad 70 (103); Craig McDermott 5/44 (10 overs)

Australia won by 18 runs
Gaddafi Stadium, Lahore, Pakistan
Umpires: Dickie Bird (Eng) and David Shepherd (Eng)
Player of the match: Craig McDermott (Aus)

- Australia won the toss and elected to bat
- Australia qualified for the final for second time after 1975.

The Australian batsmen got off to a very good start, and they scored fluently, with David Boon (65 from 91 balls, 4 fours) top scoring, and making an 82 run second-wicket partnership with DM Jones. Australia were looking to reach 300 with strong batting before Imran Khan took 3 wickets for 17 runs in 5 overs. Australia lost 4/31, but a high number of extras (34) from the Pakistani bowlers, as well as the solid batting from earlier on, brought Australia to 267 (8 wickets, 50 overs). Pakistan started badly, falling to 3/38. Imran Khan (58 from 84 balls, 4 fours) and Javed Miandad (70 from 103 balls, 4 fours) shared a partnership of 112 runs in 26 overs. However, with the required run rate at 7.87 runs when Miandad fell, there was just too much for the upcoming batsmen to do, and Pakistan lost 6/99 as they were bowled all out for 249 (all out, 49 overs). Earlier Steve Waugh scored 18 runs off the 50th over bowled by Saleem Jaffar and ironically Pakistan lost the match by 18 runs.

=== England vs India ===
5 November 1987
Scorecard

England; 254/6 (50 overs)	v	India; 219 (45.3 overs)
Graham Gooch 115 (136); Maninder Singh 3/54 (10 overs)		Mohammad Azharuddin 64 (74); Eddie Hemmings 4/52 (9.3 overs)

England won by 35 runs
Wankhede Stadium, Bombay, India
Umpires: Tony Crafter (Aus) and Steve Woodward (NZ)
Player of the match: Graham Gooch (Eng)

- England qualified for the final for second time after 1979.

India won the toss and chose to field. After reaching 2/79, Graham Gooch (115 from 136 balls, 11 fours) and captain Mike Gatting (56 from 62 balls, 5 fours) shared a partnership of 117 runs in 19 overs. After Gooch was finally stumped, 51 more runs were added, and England reached 254 (6 wickets, 50 overs). India made a bad start, falling to 3/73. The middle order scored fluently, with Mohammed Azharuddin, (64 from 74 balls, 7 fours) top scoring. Before Azharuddin was removed lbw by Eddie Hemmings, India were at 5/204, needing 5 runs an over from the last 10 overs, with 5 wickets in hand, and it looked like it would be a very close game. However, the middle and tailend order for India collapsed, as India lost 5/15. India were eventually bowled all out for 219 (all out, 45.3 overs), giving England both a berth in the final and a measure of revenge for the loss they suffered to India in the semifinal of the World Cup four years earlier in England.

== Final ==
8 November 1987
Scorecard

Australia; 253/5 (50 overs)	v	England; 246/8 (50 overs)
David Boon 75 (125); Eddie Hemmings 2/48 (10 overs)		Bill Athey 58 (103); Steve Waugh 2/37 (9 overs)

Australia won by 7 runs
Eden Gardens, Calcutta, India
Umpires: Ram Gupta (Ind) and Mahboob Shah (Pak)
Player of the match: David Boon (Aus)

Australia won the toss and chose to bat. David Boon (75 from 125 balls, 7 fours) top-scored for Australia, whose batsmen scored fluently. Australia posted 253 (5 wickets, 50 overs). Mike Veletta (45 from 31 balls, 6 fours) cut loose late in the innings, as Australia scored 65 runs from the last 6 overs of their innings. In the English reply, opener Tim Robinson fell leg before wicket for a first ball duck. Bill Athey (58 from 103 balls, 2 fours) top-scored, and England were almost on target, when captain Mike Gatting (41 from 45 balls, 3 fours, 1 six) handed back the initiative with the loss of his wicket, going for a reverse sweep which ended a growing partnership of 69 runs in 13 overs between him and Athey. Allan Lamb (45 from 55 balls, 4 fours) also posted a great innings, but it was in vain as the required run-rate for England began to rise. When England failed to score the last 17 runs from the final over, the cup went to Australia.
