= Cowdrey Lecture =

The Cowdrey Lecture, also referred to as the MCC Spirit of Cricket Cowdrey Lecture, is an annual event organised by the Marylebone Cricket Club (MCC) at Lord's Cricket Ground.

The event was first hosted in 2001, following the death of its eponym Late Lord Colin Cowdrey, in December 2000. Colin Cowdrey is reported to have been instrumental in adapting the Captains' Charter as the Spirit of Cricket and subsequently adding it as the preamble to the Laws of Cricket.

It is held annually during the English summer and is delivered by pre-eminent cricketing personalities. The event is an invite only affair, with high-profile cricketing personalities, représentatives of cricketing boards and journalists in attendance. The format of the event is simple: the Cowdrey Lecture followed by an informal discussion/question-answer session with a panel of distinguished personalities.

== List of all lectures till date ==
Cowdrey Lecturers, chronologically since inception.
Year	Lecturer	Country of Lecturer	Flag	Key Message	Panel
2001	Richie Benaud	Australia	Australia	No known recording. Manuscript available on the Lord's official website.	
2002	Barry Richards	South Africa	South Africa		
2003	Sunil Gavaskar	India	India		
2004	Clive Lloyd	West Indies	Cricket West Indies		
2005	Geoffrey Boycott	England	England		
2006	Martin Crowe	New Zealand	New Zealand		
2007	Christopher Martin-Jenkins	England	England		
2008	Desmond Tutu*	South Africa	South Africa	Racism and sports, apartheid, impact of sports on politics, Spirit of Cricket	
2009	Adam Gilchrist	Australia	Australia		
2010	Imran Khan	Pakistan	Pakistan	His struggles to introduce neutral umpires in cricket	
2011	Kumar Sangakkara*	Sri Lanka	Sri Lanka	The history of Sri Lankan cricket, Spirit of Cricket, socio-cultural impact of cricket.	Mark Nicholas, Kumar Sangakkara, Michael Holding, Andrew Strauss
2012	Tony Greig	England	England		
2013	Simon Taufel	Australia	Australia		
2014	Sir Ian Botham	England	England		
2015	Rod Marsh	Australia	Australia		Mark Nicholas, Alastair Cook, Mahela Jayawardene
2016	Brendon McCullum	New Zealand	New Zealand	Respecting the opposition, running out Muttiah Muralitharan, retirement, becoming test captain, the death of Phillip Hughes	Mark Nicholas, Kumar Sangakkara, Eoin Morgan, Brendon McCullum
2017	Brian Lara	West Indies	Cricket West Indies		Mark Nicholas, Jonny Bairstow, Anya Shrubsole
2018	Dave Richardson	South Africa	South Africa	Spirit of Cricket, Code of conduct, ball tampering incident of Newlands, Women's Cricket, Player penalties and punishments.	Mark Nicholas, Dave Richardson, Sanjay Manjrekar, Jason Roy
2019	Mike Brearley	England	England	Spirit of Cricket, the Mankad dismissal, what makes a good captain, the Cricket World Cup 2019	Mark Nicholas, Shane Warne, Mike Brearley, Kumar Sangakkara
2021	Stephen Fry	England	England		
2023	Andrew Strauss	England	England		Angus Fraser, Tammy Beaumont, Jonny Bairstow
2024	Stars of Tailenders podcast	England	England		
2025	Stars of Test Match Special	England	England	"[L]ight-hearted cricket discussion"	

* - Denotes Lecturers who received standing ovations from the audience.

=== Notable facts ===
- Desmond Tutu and Stephen Fry are the only non cricketing personalities to have ever delivered a Cowdrey lecture.
- Desmond Tutu, Kumar Sangakkara and Stephen Fry are the only personalities to have received a standing ovation for their speech.
- Kumar Sangakkara was the first, and as of 2025, the only active international cricketer to deliver the Cowdrey lecture.
- The event was cancelled in 2020 due to COVID-19 pandemic.

== Lecturers by country ==
Flag	Country	Number of lecturers
England	England	7
Australia	Australia	4
South Africa	South Africa	3
New Zealand	New Zealand	2
Cricket West Indies	West Indies	2
India	India	1
Pakistan	Pakistan	1
Sri Lanka	Sri Lanka	1

== See also ==
- International Cricket Council (ICC)
- ICC Cricket Hall of Fame
