= Gaddafi Stadium =

Cricket stadium in Lahore, Pakistan

- قذافی سٹیڈیم
- GSL
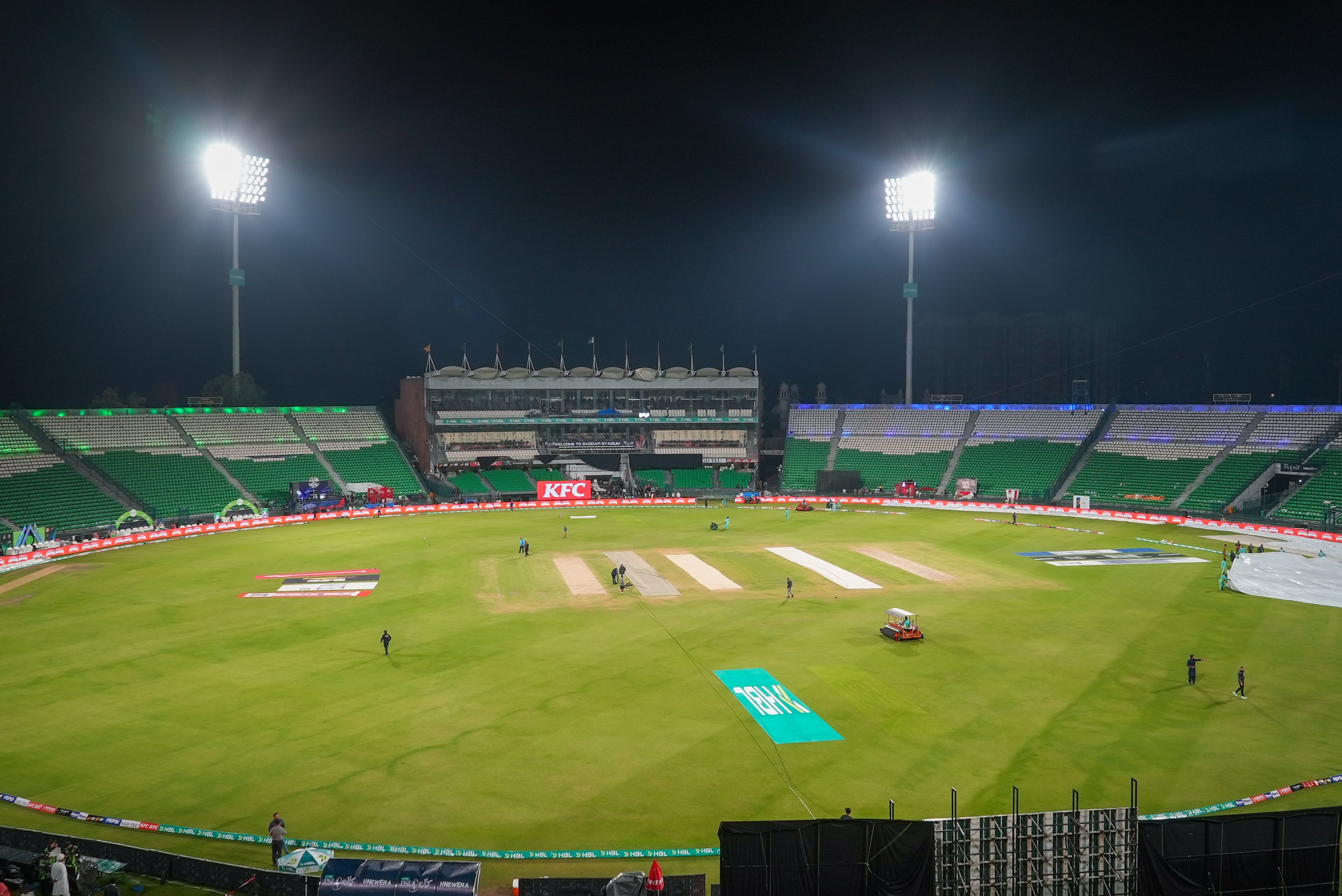
- Gaddafi Stadium during PSL 2026
- Interactive map of Gaddafi Stadium
- Former names: Lahore Stadium
- Coordinates: 31°30′48″N 74°20′0″E
- Owner: Pakistan Cricket Board
- Operator: Pakistan Cricket Board
- Capacity: 27,000
- Public transit: Gaddafi Stadium

Ground information
- Location: Lahore, Punjab
- Country: Pakistan
- Establishment: 1959; 67 years ago
- Owner: Pakistan Cricket Board
- Tenants: Pakistan national cricket team Lahore Regional Cricket Association; Central Punjab cricket team Lahore Qalandars
- End names
- Jinnah End; Iqbal End

International information
- First men's Test: 21–26 November 1959: Pakistan v Australia
- Last men's Test: 12–15 October 2025: Pakistan v South Africa
- First men's ODI: 13 January 1978: Pakistan v England
- Last men's ODI: 31 October 2026: Pakistan v Sri Lanka
- First men's T20I: 22 May 2015: Pakistan v Zimbabwe
- Last men's T20I: 1 February 2026: Pakistan v Australia
- First women's ODI: 2 November 2019: Pakistan v Bangladesh
- Last women's ODI: 22 September 2025: Pakistan v South Africa
- First women's T20I: 26 October 2019: Pakistan v Bangladesh
- Last women's T20I: 16 November 2022: Pakistan v Ireland
- As of 4 June 2026; Source: ESPNcricinfo

Gaddafi Stadium (Note: GSL; Punjabi: قذافی سٹیڈیم, romanised: Qazzāfī saṭēḍī'am; Urdu: قذافی اسٹیڈیم, romanised: Qaẕẕāfī Isṭeḍiyam) formerly known as Lahore Stadium, is a cricket stadium in Lahore, Punjab, Pakistan, owned by the Pakistan Cricket Board (PCB). With a capacity of 27,000, it is the fourth largest cricket stadium of Pakistan. The headquarters of the Pakistan Cricket Board are situated at Gaddafi Stadium, thus making it the home of the Pakistan national cricket team. It is also the home ground of Lahore Qalandars in the Pakistan Super League. It is named after Libyan revolutionary, Muammar Gaddafi (1942–2011).

Gaddafi Stadium was designed by Russian-born Pakistani architect and civil engineer Nasreddin Murat-Khan, and constructed by Mian Abdul Khaliq and Company in 1959. The stadium was renovated for the 1996 Cricket World Cup, during which it hosted the tournament final between Australia and Sri Lanka, having previously staged matches in the 1987 World Cup as well. It was the first cricket stadium in Pakistan to be equipped with modern floodlights with their own standby power generators.

In addition to Pakistan home games and international matches, the Gaddafi Stadium has also hosted several matches of the Pakistan Super League, with the first one being the final of the 2017 edition. In March 2022, the PCB began the process to rename the stadium for sponsorship reasons. In June 2024, the PCB unveiled plans to revamp Gaddafi Stadium ahead of the ICC Champions Trophy 2025, where the venue went on to host four matches, including a high-profile semi-final clash between South Africa and New Zealand. On the continental stage, the stadium also staged matches across the 2008 and 2023 Asia Cups. Adding to its legacy, it hosted games in the 1998–99 Asian Test Championship and later the 2001–02 Asian Test Championship final, featuring Pakistan and Sri Lanka.

== History ==
=== Construction ===
Gaddafi stadium was built in 1959 and designed by architect and civil engineer Nasreddin Murat-Khan and construction was completed by Mian Abdul Khaliq and Company. It was originally established as the Lahore Stadium.

=== Renaming stadium ===
On 19 March 1972, the stadium was renamed in honour of Libyan leader Muammar Gaddafi by the then president of Pakistan, Zulfikar Ali Bhutto while addressing a public meeting in Lahore. On 23 October 2011, the Pakistan Cricket Board discussed renaming the stadium following the death of Gaddafi, to support the new government in Libya. The Punjab Olympic Association made a similar request in late October 2011 to the provincial chief minister. The association's secretary Idrees Haider Khawaja said, "I don't think his profile is inspirational enough to link with our cricket stadium's identity." However, the stadium's name was not changed.

=== Redesigned ===
In 1995–96, the Gaddafi Stadium was renovated by architect Nayyar Ali Dada, who was qualified from National College of Arts, for the 1996 Cricket World Cup. Dada's redesign was done with red, hand-laid brickwork and arches. Dada also had plastic seating installed in place of the existing concrete benches. The lower portion under the stands was enclosed and converted to shops for boutiques and offices. Gaddafi Stadium, being the largest cricket stadium in Pakistan, used to have capacity of 65,250 spectators, until the redesigning of its enclosures reduced the capacity to 27,000.

=== 2024–2025 renovation efforts ===
In June 2024, PCB announced that Gaddafi Stadium will be upgraded for the upcoming 2025 ICC Champions Trophy.

The renovation plan included the construction of a new pavilion building, re-profiling of all general enclosures with stands being brought closer by 20 feet to the playing area, removal of the fencing around the stands in favour of a "moat", increasing the seating capacity from 21,500 to 34,000+ spectators, installation of new "replay screens", installation of LED lights in place of existing floodlights and a newly built head office for PCB. The project was said to be completed by 25 December 2024, however, the deadline was moved forward by a month due to minor unfinished work. After the reconstruction, the capacity increased to slightly over 27,000.

The renovated stadium was inaugurated by the Prime Minister of Pakistan Shehbaz Sharif on 7 February 2025. The inauguration ceremony included performances showcasing Pakistan's culture, by famous artists; including Arif Lohar, Ali Zafar and Aima Baig.

== Pavilions ==
The two main pavilions at Gaddafi Stadium, previously known as the main building's pavilion and far-end Pavilion, have been renamed ahead of the ICC Champions Trophy 2025. The main building's pavilion has been renamed the Jinnah End, while the far-end Pavilion is now called the Iqbal End. This renaming by the Pakistan Cricket Board (PCB) is part of an effort to modernise the stadium and honour national leaders Muhammad Ali Jinnah and Allama Iqbal. Additionally, the PCB has confirmed that the stadium itself will undergo a name change following the conclusion of the tournament.

== Cricket history ==
=== International cricket history ===
In 1976 the first of three hat-tricks was taken at the stadium, by Peter Petherick of New Zealand against Pakistan on 9 October. The next was taken by Wasim Akram of Pakistan against Sri Lanka, 6 March 1999, and the third by Mohammad Sami of Pakistan against Sri Lanka.

Pakistan has enjoyed some memorable moments on the ground, including a fifth-wicket stand of 281 between Javed Miandad and Asif Iqbal against New Zealand in 1976 and an innings and 324 run win against New Zealand in 2002.

==== First Test ====
The first-ever Test match at Gaddafi Stadium (then Lahore Stadium) was played between Pakistan and Australia from 21–26 November 1959. Australia won the match by 7 wickets, with Richie Benaud and Alan Davidson playing key roles. This match marked Lahore’s entry into the international cricket scene.

==== First ODI ====
Gaddafi Stadium hosted its first One Day International (ODI) on 13 January 1978, between Pakistan and England. England won the match by 6 wickets, setting the stage for future limited-overs cricket at the venue.

==== 1996 Cricket World Cup Final ====
The 1996 Cricket World Cup Final was held at Gaddafi Stadium, Lahore, Pakistan, on March 17, 1996. It was the first time a World Cup final was played in Pakistan, marking a historic moment for the country's cricketing legacy.

==== 2004 India-Pakistan Series ====
The 2004 India-Pakistan series was a historic bilateral cricket series as it marked return of first full India-Pakistan series since 1989 known "Friendship Series", marking the resumption of cricketing ties between the two arch-rivals after nearly 15 years of limited interactions due to political tensions. The Indian team toured Pakistan for a full series, consisting of three Tests and five ODIs, from March to April 2004. Gaddafi Stadium, Lahore, played a crucial role in this landmark series.

==== 2009 Sri Lankan team attack ====
On 3 March 2009, the scheduled third day of second Test of 2008–09 Sri Lanka tour of Pakistan, the Sri Lankan team's convoy was attacked by armed militants at Liberty Roundabout, near Gaddafi Stadium. Eight Sri Lankan players were injured, including Sri Lankan captain, Mahela Jayawardene. The Sri Lankan team was air-lifted from Gaddafi Stadium to a nearby airbase, from where they were evacuated back to Sri Lanka. This event brought a halt to international cricket in Pakistan.

==== Return of international cricket ====
International cricket returned to Pakistan on 19 May 2015, when the Zimbabwe cricket team landed at the Allama Iqbal International Airport to become the first Full Member nation to tour Pakistan since the attack. Pakistan won both ODI and T20I series comfortably.

In August 2017, PCB along with ICC started to improve international cricket in Pakistan. With that, under heavy security, PCB planned World XI tour to Pakistan for three T20Is.

In August 2017, Thilanga Sumathipala, president of Sri Lanka Cricket, said that he would like to play at least one of the three T20I matches in Lahore, Pakistan during October. In March 2009, the Sri Lanka cricket team were attacked by terrorists while travelling to the Gaddafi Stadium in Lahore. Since then, the only Test team to visit Pakistan has been Zimbabwe, when they toured during May 2015. Two of Sri Lanka's current team, Chamara Kapugedera and Suranga Lakmal were on the bus during the 2009 terrorist attack, and both could have been selected for the T20I squad for this series.

In September 2017, the fixtures were confirmed, with the final T20I match of the series scheduled to be played in Lahore. Sri Lanka Cricket said that players have a "contractual obligation" to play the match in Lahore, but it was unlikely to issue penalties to any player who chose not to visit Pakistan. However, on 14 October 2017, the Sri Lankan team expressed their reluctance to travel to Pakistan, requesting that the fixture is moved to a neutral venue. On 16 October 2017, Sri Lanka Cricket confirmed that the fixture in Lahore would go ahead as planned, but their limited-overs captain, Upul Tharanga, had pulled out of the match. Despite the concerns from the players, team manager Asanka Gurusinha felt that a competitive squad would be named. On 19 October 2017, Sri Lanka's chief selector, Graham Labrooy, said that players who do not travel to Lahore would be unlikely to be selected for the other two T20I fixtures. The squad for the T20I fixtures was named two days later, with Thisara Perera selected as captain.

The Sri Lankan squad arrived in Lahore under "extraordinary" security and made their way to the team's hotel in a bomb-proof bus. Ahead of the T20I in Lahore, Cricket Sri Lanka's president Thilanga Sumathipala said that the team was privileged to be in Pakistan and that he would help support the country in hosting more tours. Najam Sethi, chairman of the PCB, said that this fixture would be the start of international cricket returning to the country, with him expecting every country to play in Pakistan by the end of 2020. Pakistan went on to win the T20I series 3–0.

The venue also hosted three main matches as a part of the 2018 Blind Cricket World Cup.

Gaddafi Stadium hosted Bangladesh in 2020 and 2025, South Africa in 2021 and 2025, New Zealand in 2023 and 2024, and England in 2022.

The venue ultimately hosted four matches of the 2025 ICC Champions Trophy, including the semi-final between South Africa and New Zealand, marking the return of an ICC tournament to Pakistan after 29 years, since the country last hosted World Cup matches in 1996. It also hosted the matches of 2025 Women's Cricket World Cup Qualifier.

After 2022, Australia returned to Pakistan in 2026 after four years to play three T20I matches in preparation for the 2026 Men's T20 World Cup and then for an ODI series in May-June.

The venue hosted two matches of 2024–25 Pakistan Tri-Nation Series and final leg of 2026–27 Pakistan ODI Tri-Series including the final.

=== Domestic cricket history ===
On 5 March 2017, the final of the 2017 Pakistan Super League was played in the stadium, the first time a PSL fixture was being played in Pakistan. After the success of holding the final, the Pakistan Cricket Board decided to play two games of the 2018 Pakistan Super League in Pakistan. In September 2019, the Pakistan Cricket Board named it as one of the venues to host matches in the 2019–20 Quaid-e-Azam Trophy. The stadium has also hosted the finals of the 2022, 2023, 2025 and 2026 editions of the Pakistan Super League.

== Records ==
=== Test ===
- Highest team total: 699/5, by Pakistan against India in 1989.
- Lowest team total: 73, by New Zealand against Pakistan in 2002.
- Highest individual score: 329, by Inzamam-ul-Haq against New Zealand in 2002.

=== One Day International ===
- Highest team total: 375/3, by Pakistan against Zimbabwe, 26 May 2015.
- Lowest team total: 75, by Pakistan against Sri Lanka, 22 January 2009.
- Highest individual score: 177, by Ibrahim Zadran against England, 26 February 2025.

=== T20 International ===
- Highest team total: 209/3, by England against Pakistan, 2 October 2022.
- Lowest team total: 94, by New Zealand against Pakistan, 14 April 2023.
- Highest individual score: 107*, by Mohammad Haris against Bangladesh, 1 June 2025.

== Cricket World Cup ==
This stadium hosted six One Day International (ODI) matches during 1987 Cricket World Cup and 1996 Cricket World Cup, including the final between Sri Lanka and Australia.

=== 1987 Cricket World Cup ===
16 October 1987
Scorecard

West Indies; 216 (50 overs)	v	Pakistan; 217/9 (50 overs)

Pakistan won by 1 wicket

4 November 1987
Scorecard

Australia; 267/6 (50 overs)	v	Pakistan; 249 (49.2 overs)

Australia won by 18 runs

=== 1996 Cricket World Cup ===
26 February
Scorecard

Netherlands; 145/7 (50 overs)	v	Pakistan; 151/2 (30.4 overs)
Flavian Aponso 58; Waqar Younis 4/26 (10 Overs)		Saeed Anwar 83*; Peter Cantrell 1/18 (4 overs)

Pakistan won by 8 wickets
Umpires: K.T. Francis and Steve Bucknor
Player of the match: Waqar Younis (Pak)

1 March
Scorecard

Netherlands; 216/9 (50 overs)	v	United Arab Emirates; 220/3 (44.2 overs)
Peter Cantrell 47 (106); Shaukat Dukanwala 5/29 (10 overs)		Saleem Raza 84 (68); Roland Lefebvre 1/24 (8 overs)

United Arab Emirates won by 7 wickets
Umpires: Mahboob Shah and Steve Randell
Player of the match: Shaukat Dukanwala (UAE)

- This was the first ever official ODI between two ICC Associate teams.

6 March
Scorecard

Pakistan; 281/5 (50 overs)	v	New Zealand; 235 (47.3 overs)
Saeed Anwar 62 (67); Robert Kennedy 1/32 (5 overs)		Stephen Fleming 42 (43); Mushtaq Ahmed 2/32 (10 overs)

Pakistan won by 46 runs
Umpires: K.T. Francis and Ian Robinson
Player of the match: Saleem Malik (Pak)

=== 1996 Cricket World Cup final ===
17 March
Scorecard

Australia; 241/7 (50 overs)	v	Sri Lanka; 245/3 (46.2 overs)
Mark Taylor 74 (83); Aravinda de Silva 3/42 (9 overs)		Aravinda de Silva 107 (124); Damien Fleming 1/43 (6 overs)

Sri Lanka won by 7 wickets
Umpires: Steve Bucknor and David Shepherd
Player of the match: Aravinda de Silva (SL)

== ICC Champions Trophy ==
The stadium hosted four One Day Internationals (ODI) during the 2025 ICC Champions Trophy, including one semi-final between New Zealand and South Africa.

22 February 2025
14:00 UTC+5 (D/N)
Scorecard

England; 351/8 (50 overs)	v	Australia; 356/5 (47.3 overs)

Australia won by 5 wickets
Gaddafi Stadium, Lahore

26 February 2025
14:00 UTC+5 (D/N)
Scorecard

Afghanistan; 325/7 (50 overs)	v	England; 317 (49.5 overs)

Afghanistan won by 8 runs
Gaddafi Stadium, Lahore

28 February 2025
14:00 UTC+5 (D/N)
Scorecard

Afghanistan; 273/9 (50 overs)	v	Australia; 109/1 (12.5 overs)

No result
Gaddafi Stadium, Lahore

Semi-final 2
5 March 2025
14:00 UTC+5 (D/N)
Scorecard

New Zealand; 362/6 (50 overs)	v	South Africa; 312/9 (50 overs)

New Zealand won by 50 runs
Gaddafi Stadium, Lahore

== See also ==
- 2009 attack on the Sri Lanka national cricket team
- List of Test cricket grounds
- List of stadiums in Pakistan
- List of sports venues in Lahore
- List of cricket grounds by capacity
