= Khizer Hayat =

Pakistani cricketer and umpire (1939–2025)

Khizer Hayat خضر حيات
Personal information
- Born: 5 January 1939; Lahore, Punjab Province, British India
- Died: 23 November 2025 (aged 86)
- Batting: Right-handed
- Bowling: Leg-spin

Domestic team information
- Years: Team
- 1956/57: Punjab A
- 1959/60–1967/68: Pakistan Railways
- First-class debut: 13 January 1957 Punjab A v Pakistan Railways
- Last First-class: 26 January 1968 Pakistan Railways v Karachi Blues

Umpiring information
- Tests umpired: 34 (1980–1996)
- ODIs umpired: 55 (1978–1996)
- FC umpired: 151 (1974–1997)
- LA umpired: 118 (1978–1997)

Career statistics
Competition	First-class
Matches	21
Runs scored	539
Batting average	22.45
100s/50s	1/2
Top score	121
Balls bowled	52
Wickets	0
Bowling average	–
5 wickets in innings	–
10 wickets in match	–
Best bowling	–
Catches/stumpings	15/3
- Source: CricketArchive, 25 August 2011

Khizer Hayat (Urdu: خضر حيات; 5 January 1939 – 23 November 2025) was a Pakistani cricketer and umpire. He played first-class cricket for ten years before taking up umpiring. He officiated in 34 Test matches and 55 One Day International matches.

== Biography ==
=== Early life ===
Hayat was born on 5 January 1939 in Lahore, Punjab Province, British India.

=== Playing career ===
Before becoming an umpire, Hayat played in 21 first-class matches. He played once for the Punjab A cricket team in January 1957, in the 1956/7 Quaid-e-Azam Trophy against Pakistan Railways, but failed to score a run in either innings. He then played for Pakistan Railways in January 1960, in their 1959/60 Quaid-e-Azam Trophy quarter-final match against Lahore, making small scores. He played twice for a combined Railways and Quetta team in January 1961, helping them to win the semi-final and final of the 1960/1 Ayub Trophy, scoring 52 not out in their winning first-innings score of 468 in the final. He played as wicket-keeper for Pakistan Railways from 1961 to 1965, scoring 121 against Pakistan Universities in December 1962, and bowling 10 balls against Karachi Blues in a losing match in March 1964. Ijaz Hussain took over as wicket-keeper in December 1964, and Hayat captained Pakistan Railways against the Sargodha cricket team, a combined Punjab University and Lahore Education Board team, and against Lahore Greens in 1964/5, making 58 in the latter match. He played for the Pakistan Railways Greens against Karachi University and Karachi Blues in April 1966, bowling a few overs in both matches. His last two matches were played for Pakistan Railways against Hyderabad and Karachi Blues in January 1968 under the captaincy of Arif Butt.

His first-class career total was 539 runs, at a batting average of 22.45, including one century and two half-centuries. He took 15 catches and made 3 stumpings. He bowled very occasional leg breaks, delivering only 52 balls and taking no wickets.

=== Umpiring career ===
Hayat officiated in 34 Tests from March 1980 to October 1996, and 55 One-day Internationals (ODI) from November 1978 to December 1996, mainly in Pakistan. He made his Test umpiring debut in March 1980, in the 3rd Test between Pakistan and Australia at the Gaddafi Stadium, Lahore; his fellow on-field umpire in that match was Amanullah Khan. He umpired regularly in Test matches in Pakistan until 1996. In 1994, he and Mahboob Shah were the two Pakistani representatives on the first international panel of umpires, set up by the ICC to ensure that one neutral umpire would officiate in every Test match. He umpired in his first Test outside Pakistan in March 1994, in the match between New Zealand and India at Trust Bank Park (Seddon Park), Hamilton, together with Brian Aldridge. His last Test was the 1st Test between Pakistan and Zimbabwe at Sheikhupura Stadium in October 1996.

In December 1989, Hayat deputized as square leg umpire for John Holder, who suffered a stomach upset, in Javed Miandad's 100th Test, against India at Gaddafi Stadium, Lahore, while John Hampshire stood behind the stumps at both ends. After the 1st Test between Australia and Sri Lanka at Perth in December 1995, Hayat was caught up in controversy when he and Peter Parker alleged that the Sri Lankan team had tampered with the ball. The Sri Lankans were later cleared by the ICC.

Hayat made his debut as an ODI umpire in the match between Pakistan and India at Zafar Ali Stadium in Sahiwal on 3 November 1978. He umpired in ODI tournaments in Sharjah, and in the 1987 Cricket World Cup in India, the 1992 Cricket World Cup in New Zealand and Australia, and the 1996 Cricket World Cup in Sri Lanka and Pakistan. His last ODI was played between Pakistan and New Zealand at Jinnah Stadium, Sialkot on 6 December 1996.

In the 1978 India Pakistan series, Hayat and fellow umpire Javed Akhtar came under criticism for alleged cheating. Having given every decision on behalf of Pakistan, and having ignored 4 wide balls above the bowlers head, India were forced to concede the match from a winning position. Both umpires denied the allegations.

=== Death ===
Hayat died on 23 November 2025, at the age of 86.

== International umpiring statistics ==
	First	Last	Total
Tests	Pakistan v Australia at Lahore, 18–23 Mar 1980	Pakistan v Zimbabwe at Sheikhupura, 17–21 Oct 1996	34
ODIs	Pakistan v India at Sahiwal, 3 November 1978	Pakistan v New Zealand at Sialkot, 6 December 1996	55
