= Mike Veletta =

Australian cricketer

Personal information
- Full name: Michael Robert John Veletta
- Born: 30 October 1963 (age 63); Perth, Western Australia, Australia
- Height: 175 cm (5 ft 9 in)
- Batting: Right-handed
- Role: Batsman, wicket-keeper

International information
- National side: Australia (1987–1990)
- Test debut (cap 341): 4 December 1987 v New Zealand
- Last Test: 3 February 1990 v Pakistan
- ODI debut (cap 97): 3 April 1987 v Pakistan
- Last ODI: 29 May 1989 v England

Domestic team information
- Years: Team
- 1983/84–1994/95: Western Australia
- 1997/98–1998/99: Australian Capital Territory

Career statistics
Competition	Test	ODI	FC	LA
Matches	8	20	151	92
Runs scored	207	484	8,802	2,147
Batting average	18.81	32.26	39.12	29.81
100s/50s	0/0	0/2	20/48	1/14
Top score	39	68*	262	105*
Balls bowled	–	–	18	–
Wickets	–	–	0	–
Bowling average	–	–	–	–
5 wickets in innings	–	–	0	–
10 wickets in match	–	–	0	–
Best bowling	–	–	–	–
Catches/stumpings	12/–	8/–	194/3	43/2
Medal record
Men's Cricket
Representing Australia
ICC Cricket World Cup
Winner	1987 India and Pakistan
- Source: ESPNcricinfo, 11 March 2024

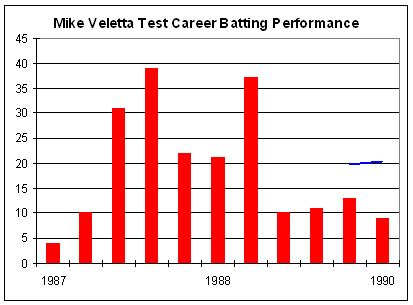
Test batting chart of Mike Veletta. Red columns are the runs in the innings. Blue dots indicate not outs. Blue line is average in the last ten innings.

Michael Robert John Veletta (born 30 October 1963) is a former Australian cricketer.

He played in eight Test matches and 20 One Day Internationals between 1987 and 1990. He played 127 first-class matches including 114 Sheffield Shield matches, and 41 domestic one-day matches for Western Australia. Veletta was a part of the Australian team that won their first world title during the 1987 Cricket World Cup.

== Domestic career ==
Veletta made his first class debut in 1983-84. He played in the Sheffield Shield final that summer, where WA beat Queensland.

The following season he made 665 first class runs at 39.11 with a top score of 143.

In 1985-86 his form was even better, with 715 runs at 47.66. He was selected on the 1986 tour to India but did not play a test.

In 1986-87 Veletta made 971 runs at 74.69. He played a key innings in the Shield final that year, his score of 262 being instrumental in securing a draw for WA (and thus winning the Shield). He was selected in the 1987 World Cup Squad.

In 1987-88 Veletta appeared in another Shield final, scoring 59 in the second innings to help WA defeat Queensland.

Veletta's best first class season was 1988-89 where he made 1004 runs at 47.80. WA won another Shield that year.

Veletta appeared in the 1991-92 Shield final, scoring a pair, although WA won the game.

His last first class game was in March 1995.

== International career ==
In the 1987 Cricket World Cup Veletta played a pivotal role for Australia. In the final against England he slammed 45 off only 31 balls, an innings that was ultimately decisive as Australia edged out England by the narrow margin of seven runs. However at Test level he never really performed to his potential. The dogged opener got numerous starts, but failed to reach a half-century, his highest score being 39. He toured India in 1986.

Veletta made his test debut against New Zealand in 1987-88 replacing Greg Ritchie in the batting line up. He made 4 in his first test, 10 in his second and 31 and 39 in his third (the latter innings, which helped Australia secure a draw, would be his best test score).

In the Bicentennial Test against England, Veletta scored 22. Then against Sri Lanka he made 21.

He was kept in the side to play the West Indies in 1988-89, making 37 and 10 in the first test and 11 and 13 in the second, then he was dropped.

He was recalled to play Pakistan in 1989-90 but was dropped from the Test side after a score of 9 against Pakistan in the washed out 3rd Test played in Sydney in February 1990. He was in the 1989 Ashes tour party to England and appeared in a One Day International as a wicket-keeper.

== Coaching career ==
In 2001 he was appointed coach of the Western Warriors; however the Western Australian Cricket Association terminated the contract after two years of the three-year contract. The remainder of his contract was paid out in full. He coached the Domestic One day side the Canberra Comets from 1995–96 to 1998–99.
