= National Stadium, Karachi =

Cricket stadium in Karachi, Pakistan

National Stadium
- قومی اسٹیڈیم
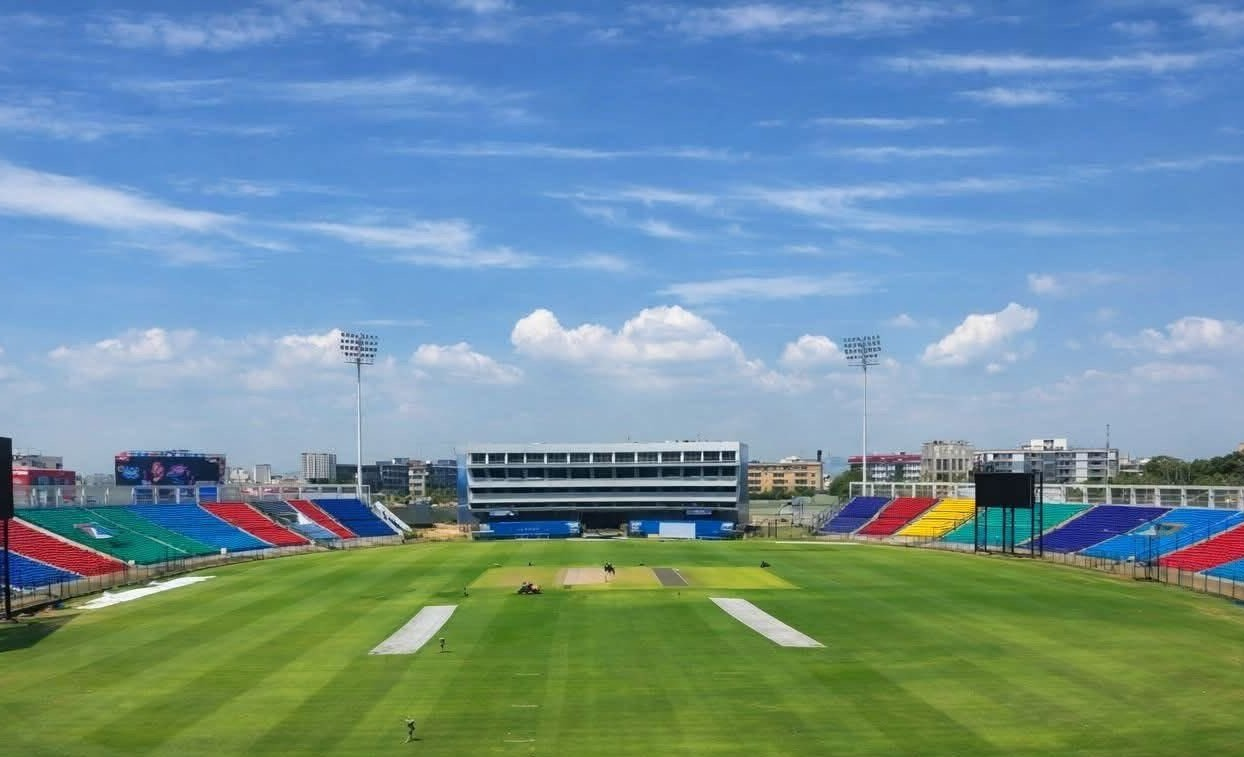
- National Stadium in 2026 after Roof removal
- Interactive map of National Stadium
- Address: Karachi; Pakistan
- Coordinates: 24°53′46″N 67°4′53″E
- Owner: Pakistan Cricket Board
- Operator: Pakistan Cricket Board
- Capacity: 30,000
- Public transit: National Stadium

Ground information
- Location: Karachi, Sindh, Pakistan
- Country: Pakistan
- Establishment: April 21, 1955; 71 years ago
- Tenants: Pakistan national cricket team Karachi Kings

International information
- First men's Test: 26 February–1 March 1955: Pakistan v India
- Last men's Test: 2–6 January 2023: Pakistan v New Zealand
- First men's ODI: 21 November 1980: Pakistan v West Indies
- Last men's ODI: 1 March 2025: South Africa v England
- First men's T20I: 20 April 2008: Pakistan v Bangladesh
- Last men's T20I: 25 September 2022: Pakistan v England
- Only women's Test: 15–18 March 2004: Pakistan v West Indies
- First women's ODI: 9 April 2001: Pakistan v Netherlands
- Last women's ODI: 9 May 2026: Pakistan v Zimbabwe
- First women's T20I: 1 September 2023: Pakistan v South Africa
- Last women's T20I: 15 May 2026: Pakistan v Zimbabwe
- As of 15 May 2026; Source: ESPNcricinfo

The National Stadium, officially known as the National Bank Stadium, is an international cricket ground in Karachi, Sindh, Pakistan, owned by the Pakistan Cricket Board. It is the home ground of the Karachi Kings franchise in Pakistan Super League and other domestic cricket teams of Sindh.

It was built in the early 1950s under the supervision of senior civil engineer Abdul Rasheed Khan (WP) and Kafiluddin, and was formally inaugurated in April 1955. In October 2022, the National Bank of Pakistan and the PCB agreed to a five-year naming-rights agreement, and the stadium was renamed as National Bank Cricket Arena.

The Pakistan cricket team have a remarkable Test record at the ground and is known as the fortress of Pakistan cricket. The stadium has witnessed several memorable moments, such as Viv Richards 181 against Sri Lanka at the 1987 Cricket World Cup, Mohammad Yousuf's record ninth century of the year to break Viv Richards' record of most runs in a calendar year, and Kamran Akmal's famous century against India on a very difficult pitch in 2006, after Pakistan had collapsed to 39 for 6, in a come-from-behind victory.

== History ==
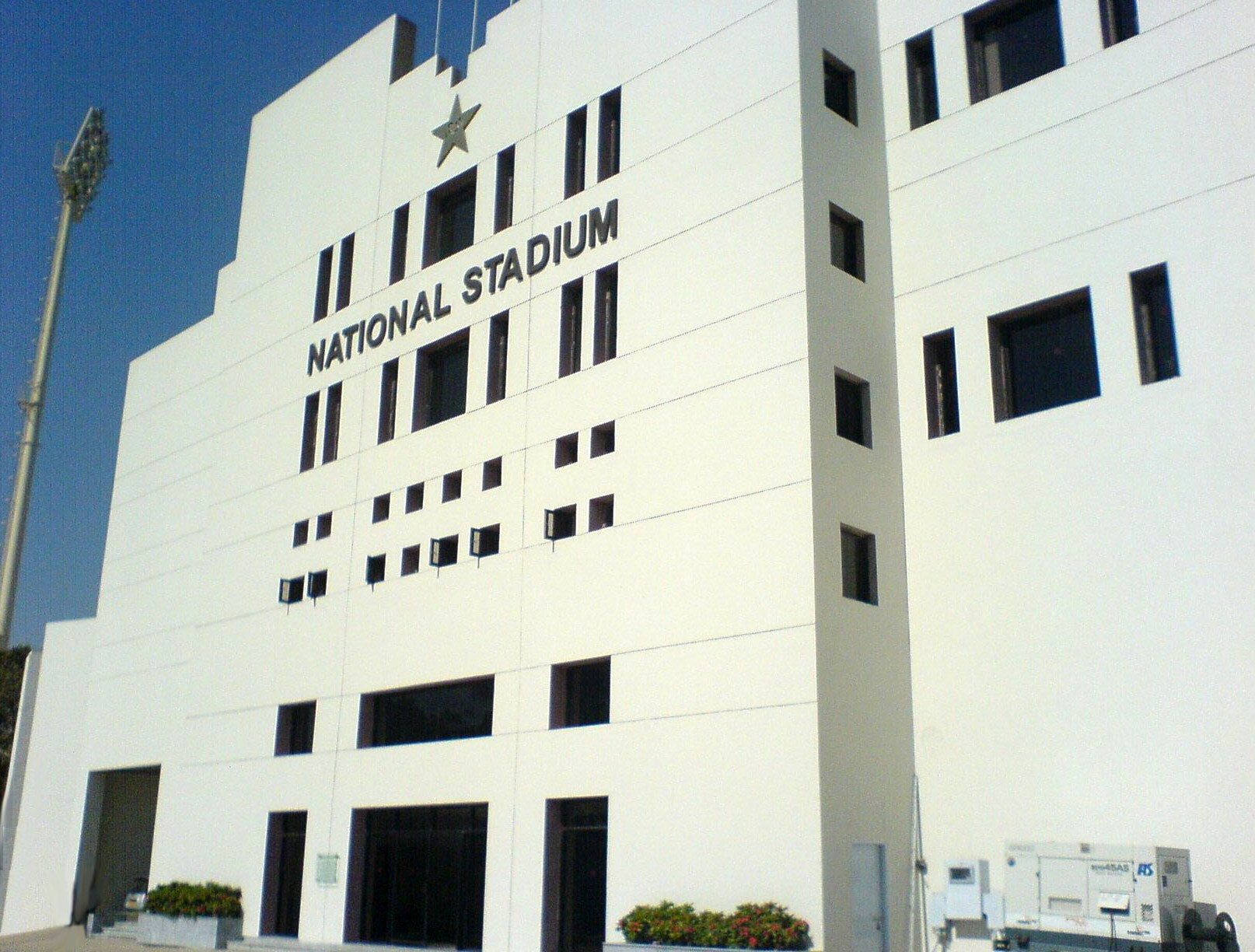
Entrance of the National Stadium

National Stadium was established in April 1955. At that time, Karachi was the capital of Pakistan, but the only cricket ground was the one at the Karachi Gymkhana which had limited seating capacity. A plan was formulated to develop a new stadium for which a plot of land measuring 70.6 ha (174.5 acres) was acquired by the Pakistan Public Works Department through the Commissioner of Karachi. After which under the guidance of Mr. Kafiluddin Ahmed, a senior civil engineer from East Pakistan and Mr. Abdul Rasheed Khan, a senior civil engineer from West Pakistan and was formally inaugurated in April 1955. the stadium was built which became Karachi's fifth and Pakistan's 11th first-class ground.

The inaugural first-class match was played at NSK between Pakistan and India on 20–24 April 1955, and it became a fortress of Pakistan cricket. In 34 Tests between that first match and December 2000, Pakistan won 17 and were never beaten. They lost their first Test on the ground against England in 2000–01.

During the 1980s, the stadium also hosted international football matches, and was chosen as venue for the 1982 Quaid-e-Azam International Tournament.

In November 1989, Sachin Tendulkar and Waqar Younis played their first test match in this stadium.

The first ODI at the National Stadium was against West Indies on 21 November 1980, and it went down to the last ball as Gordon Greenidge drove Imran Khan imperiously to the cover boundary with three needed. It has been a far less successful limited-overs venue, with defeats outnumbering victories. In fact, in a little under five years from the start of 1996, Pakistan failed to win on the ground. It also staged a quarter-final match in the 1996 World Cup.

A 75-metre-long (246.1 ft), 44-metre-wide (144.4 ft) screen was installed at the ground in 2007 at a cost of Rs. 7 million.

In September 2019, the Pakistan Cricket Board named it as one of the venues to host matches in the 2019–20 Quaid-e-Azam Trophy.

In October 2022, the Pakistan Cricket Board renamed the stadium from National Stadium Karachi to the National Bank Cricket Arena after signing a successful deal with the National Bank of Pakistan (NBP) for 5 years. This was the first naming-rights deal for a stadium in Pakistan. According to the agreement, the NBP will be permitted to utilize the venue's signs and nomenclature outside of the playing area.

=== Return of international cricket ===
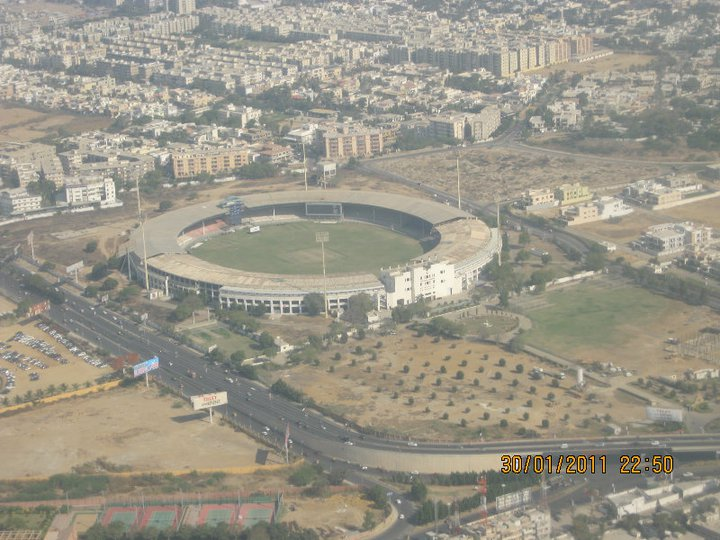
Bird's-eye view of the stadium in 2011

PCB Chairman Najam Sethi announced in 2017 that Karachi's National Stadium will host the final match of 2018 Pakistan Super League on 25 March 2018. The stadium's dressing rooms and VIP boxes were renovated for the final, along with the pitch and outfield. Around 800 CCTV cameras and several elevators were also installed. Around Rs. 1.5 billion was spent on this renovation, which was being done for the first time since the 1996 Cricket World Cup.

The historic match, which was played between Islamabad United and Peshawar Zalmi, saw the return of international stars to National Stadium after a gap of nine years, ended up being relatively one-sided, as the 2016 champions Islamabad United were crowned champions once again. The match was the first major cricket event since 2009 in the port city and it was highly welcomed by crowds and the stadium witnessed packed house for the big game. In order to make it a successful event, many security forces were deployed in and around the stadium to maintain the law and order situation, by their efforts the event was held successfully.

In 2017, PCB Chairman had announced that West Indies would tour Pakistan for 3 match T20I series which were scheduled to be played in Lahore, the fixtures were to be played in November 2017. However, early in November 2017, reports announced that the West Indies team would not be travelling to Pakistan over security concerns. The Pakistan Cricket Board (PCB) chairman Najam Sethi stated that the original schedule was changed due to unforeseen weather, logistic issues and challenges with security. In March 2018, the PCB confirmed that the fixtures would take place in April at the National Stadium in Karachi after the conclusion of PSL 2018. The last time an international cricket match was played at the venue in Karachi was in February 2009, when Sri Lanka toured Pakistan. That series was cut short, following a 2009 attack on the Sri Lanka national cricket team.

It was the first tour in Pakistan of more than one match against another Test nation since Zimbabwe toured in May 2015.

=== Sri Lanka vs Pakistan (2019) ===
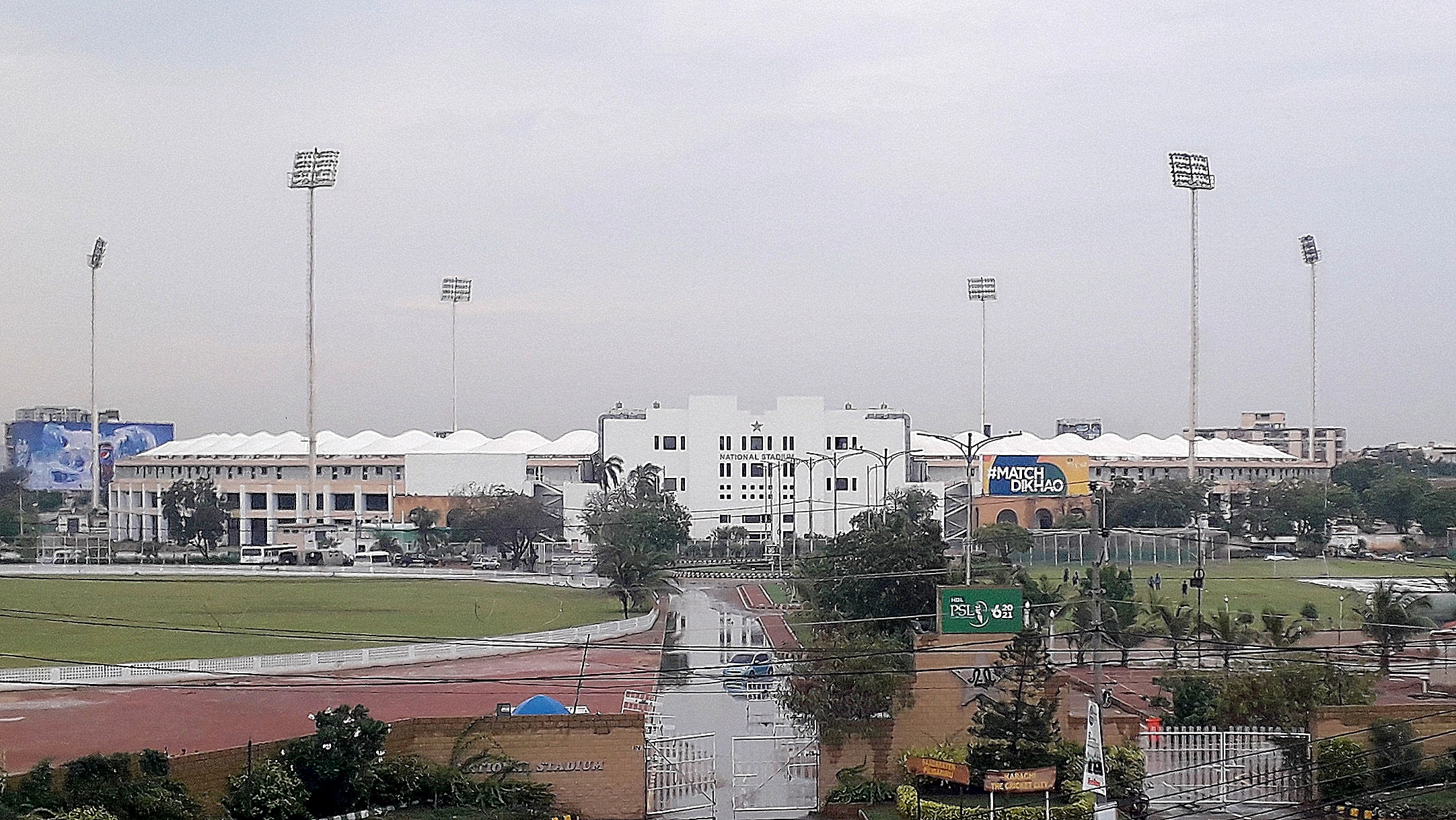
National Stadium after renovation prepared for PSL 6

In May 2019, at the Asian Cricket Council (ACC) meeting in Singapore, the Pakistan Cricket Board (PCB) made a request to Sri Lanka Cricket (SLC) to play the two Test matches in Pakistan. In July 2019, the SLC sent a security expert to assess the situation in Pakistan, with Sri Lanka Cricket saying they were "likely" to play a Test match in the country. A further decision was taken by Sri Lanka after a security delegation inspects venues in Lahore and Karachi in early August 2019. The delegation gave Sri Lanka Cricket "very positive feedback", suggesting that Sri Lanka could be open to playing a Test match in Pakistan. On 22 August 2019, Sri Lanka's Sports Minister confirmed their agreement to play a three-match ODI and T20I series in Pakistan in October, but ruled out playing any Test matches. On 23 August, PCB announced dates for the ODI and T20I series. Sri Lanka were to play three match ODI series at National Stadium, starting from 27 September. This was supposed be the first time since 21 January 2009 that an ODI match will be held at National Stadium. But, the first ODI match was abandoned due to heavy rain. It was the first time that an ODI match at the venue had been washed out. As a result, the Pakistan Cricket Board (PCB) rescheduled the second ODI match, moving it back one day to 30 September 2019, to allow the ground staff more time to prepare the outfield. As a result, the National Stadium had to wait for few more days to host an ODI match.

In October 2019, the PCB proposed hosting the two Test matches in Pakistan, instead of the UAE, at venues in Rawalpindi and Karachi. Sri Lanka Cricket said that they were "very positive" with regards to the progress of playing Test cricket in Pakistan. In November 2019, PCB confirmed the dates and venues for the Test series. National Stadium hosted the second test match, starting from 19 December.

=== Renovation and upgradation ===
National Stadium's dressing rooms, VIP boxes, and pitch, were renovated in 2017 as part of a Rs. 1.5 billion renovation project. This initiative also saw the installation of around 800 CCTV cameras for improved security and several new elevators to ease crowd movement.

==== 2024–25 renovation efforts ====
In 2024-25 efforts were made to renovate the stadium for the upcoming 2025 ICC Champions Trophy. These renovations include new LED floodlights, New guardrail for fans, New pavilion building which contains 24 hospitality boxes and increased the capacity of the stadium from 28,000 to 30,000. Along with these new foldable chairs were added to some of the stands. The total cost of these renovations is estimated to be around Rs.3.5 Billion.

The stadium was officially inaugurated on February 11, 2025, following extensive renovations in preparation for the ICC Champions Trophy 2025. The ceremony was graced by prominent figures, including Sindh Governor Kamran Tessori, Chief Minister Murad Ali Shah, and Pakistan Cricket Board (PCB) Chairman Mohsin Naqvi. The event featured live performances by renowned artists Ali Zafar, Shafqat Amanat Ali, and Sahir Ali Bagga, culminating in a spectacular fireworks display and a captivating light show. The public was invited to join the celebrations with free entry, marking a significant milestone in Pakistan's cricketing history.

== Records ==
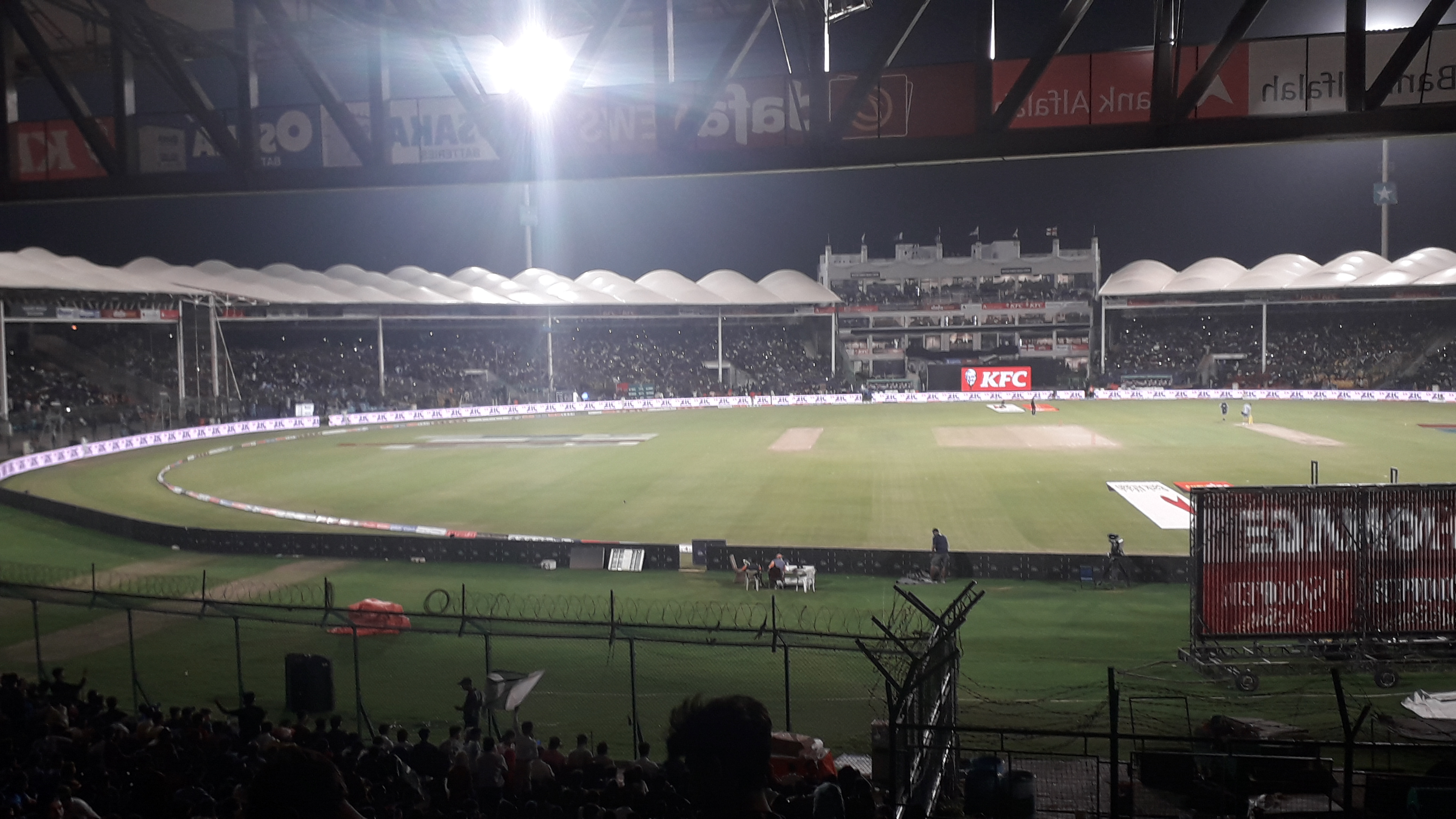
National Stadium from spectators view

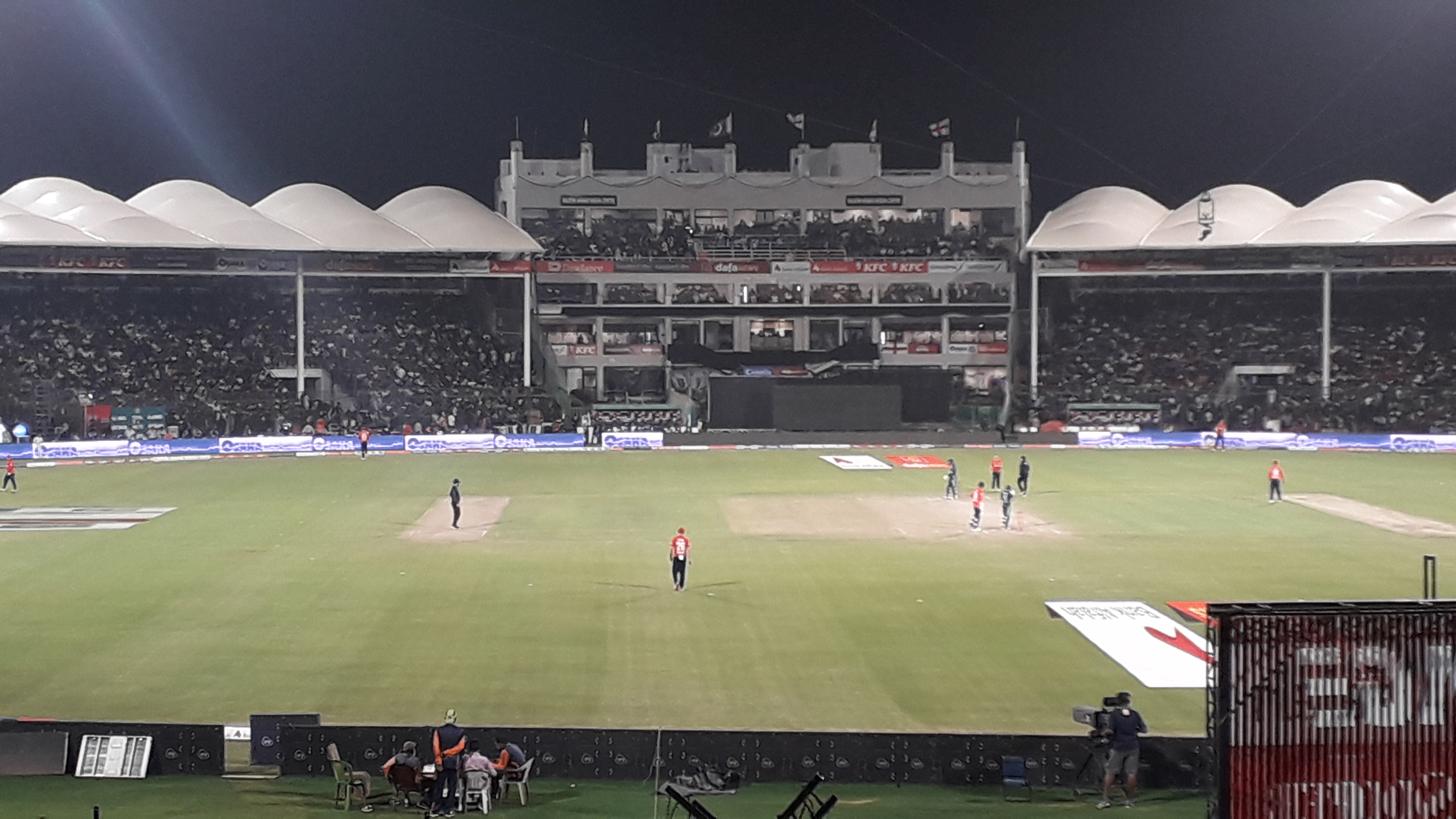
National Stadium Pavilion End

=== Test ===
- Highest team total: 765/6d, by Pakistan against Sri Lanka in 2009.
- Lowest team total: 80, by Australia against Pakistan in 1956.
- Highest run chase achieved: 315/9, by Pakistan in 1959.
- Highest partnership: 437, by Mahela Jayawardene and Thilan Samaraweera against Pakistan in 2010.

=== One Day International ===
- Highest team total: 374/4, by India against Hong Kong, 25 June 2008.
- Highest run chase (Won or Loss) 355/4 by Pakistan against South Africa, 12 February 2025.
- Lowest team total: 115, by Bangladesh against Pakistan, 4 July 2008.
- Highest run chase achieved: 355/4 by Pakistan against South Africa, 12 February 2025.
- Highest individual score: 181, by Viv Richards against Sri Lanka, 13 October 1987.
- Highest partnership: 260, by Mohammad Rizwan and Salman Ali Agha against South Africa, 12 February 2025.

=== T20 International ===
- Highest team total: 221/3 by England against Pakistan, 23 September 2022.
- Lowest team total: 60/9 by West Indies against Pakistan, 1 April 2018.
- Highest individual score: 110* by Babar Azam against England, 22 September 2022.
- Highest partnership: 203*, by Babar Azam and Mohammad Rizwan against England, 22 September 2022.

== Cricket World Cup ==
This stadium hosted six One Day International (ODI) matches during 1987 Cricket World Cup and 1996 Cricket World Cup.

=== 1987 Cricket World Cup ===
13 October 1987
Scorecard

West Indies; 360/4 (50 overs)	v	Sri Lanka; 169/4 (50 overs)

West Indies won by 191 runs

20 October 1987
Scorecard

England; 244/9 (50 overs)	v	Pakistan; 247/3 (49 overs)

Pakistan won by 7 wickets

30 October 1987
Scorecard

West Indies; 258/7 (50 overs)	v	Pakistan; 230/9 (50 overs)

West Indies won by 28 runs

=== 1996 Cricket World Cup ===
29 February
Scorecard

Pakistan; 242/6 (50 overs)	v	South Africa; 243/5 (44.2 overs)
Aamir Sohail 111 (139); Hansie Cronje 2/20 (5 overs)		Daryll Cullinan 65 (76); Waqar Younis 3/50 (8 overs)

South Africa won by 5 wickets
Umpires: K.T. Francis and Steve Bucknor
Player of the match: Hansie Cronje (SA)

3 March
Scorecard

England; 249/9 (50 overs)	v	Pakistan; 250/3 (47.4 overs)
Robin Smith 75 (92); Mushtaq Ahmed 3/53 (10 overs)		Saeed Anwar 71 (72); Dominic Cork 2/59 (10 overs)

Pakistan won by 7 wickets
Umpires: B.C. Cooray and Srinivas Venkataraghavan
Player of the match: Aamer Sohail (Pak)

11 March
Scorecard

West Indies; 264/8 (50 overs)	v	South Africa; 245 (49.3 overs)
Brian Lara 111 (94); Brian McMillan 2/37 (10 overs)		Daryll Cullinan 69 (78); Roger Harper 4/47 (10 overs)

West Indies won by 19 runs
Umpires: K.T. Francis and Steve Randell
Player of the match: Brian Lara (WI)

== ICC Champions Trophy ==
19 February 2025
14:00 UTC+5 (D/N)
Scorecard

New Zealand; 320/5 (50 overs)	v	Pakistan; 260 (47.2 overs)
Tom Latham 118* (104); Naseem Shah 2/63 (10 overs)		Khushdil Shah 69 (49); Will O'Rourke 3/47 (9 overs)

New Zealand won by 60 runs
Umpires: Richard Kettleborough (Eng) and Sharfuddoula (Ban)
Player of the match: Tom Latham (NZ)

- Pakistan won the toss and elected to field.
- Will Young (NZ) became the fourth New Zealand batter to score a century in the Champions Trophy and the first Kiwi to score a ton in his debut game of the tournament.

21 February 2025
14:00 UTC+5 (D/N)
Scorecard

South Africa; 315/6 (50 overs)	v	Afghanistan; 208 (43.3 overs)
Ryan Rickelton 103 (106); Mohammad Nabi 2/51 (10 overs)		Rahmat Shah 90 (92); Kagiso Rabada 3/36 (8.3 overs)

South Africa won by 107 runs
Umpires: Sharfuddoula (Ban) and Alex Wharf (Eng)
Player of the match: Ryan Rickelton (SA)

- South Africa won the toss and elected to bat.
- This was Afghanistan's first ODI in the Champions Trophy.
- Ryan Rickelton (SA) scored his maiden century in ODIs. He became the first South African to score a hundred on his Champions Trophy debut.
- For only the second time in Champions Trophy history, South Africa innings witnessed four or more 50-plus scores.
- This is the highest match aggregate (523) for Afghanistan vs South Africa in ODIs.

1 March 2025
14:00 UTC+5 (D/N)
Scorecard

England; 179 (38.2 overs)	v	South Africa; 181/3 (29.1 overs)
Joe Root 37 (44); Wiaan Mulder 3/25 (7.2 overs)		Rassie van der Dussen 72* (87); Jofra Archer 2/55 (9 overs)

South Africa won by 7 wickets
National Stadium, Karachi
Umpires: Ahsan Raza (Pak) and Rod Tucker (Aus)
Player of the match: Marco Jansen (SA)

- England won the toss and elected to bat.
- Liam Livingstone (Eng) played in his 100th international match.
- Kagiso Rabada (SA) took his 100th wicket against England in international cricket.
- Lungi Ngidi (SA) took his 100th ODI wicket.
- Rassie van der Dussen (SA) completed 500 runs against England in ODIs.
- As a result of this match, South Africa qualified for the semi-finals while Afghanistan were eliminated from the tournament.

== Football tournaments ==
=== 1982 Quaid-e-Azam International Tournament ===
The stadium was the venue for the 1982 Quaid-e-Azam International Tournament.

Date	Team #1	Res.	Team #2	Round	Attendance
12 February 1982	Pakistan Greens	2–0	Nepal	Round Robin	N/A
13 February 1982	Pakistan Blues	2–1	Oman	Round Robin	N/A
14 February 1982	Pakistan Blues	1–1	Nepal	Round Robin	N/A
14 February 1982	Oman	0–0	(China) Shandong	Round Robin	N/A
15 February 1982	Pakistan Blues	2–1	Bangladesh	Round Robin	N/A
15 February 1982	Iran	0–0	(China) Shandong	Round Robin	N/A
16 February 1982	Iran	1–0	Pakistan Greens	Round Robin	N/A
16 February 1982	Nepal	1–1	Bangladesh	Round Robin	N/A
17 February 1982	Oman	1–0	Nepal	Round Robin	N/A
17 February 1982	Pakistan Blues	2–1	(China) Shandong	Round Robin	N/A
18 February 1982	Iran	4–1	Pakistan Blues	Round Robin	N/A
18 February 1982	Pakistan Greens	2–1	Bangladesh	Round Robin	N/A
19 February 1982	(China) Shandong	0–1	Nepal	Round Robin	N/A
19 February 1982	Oman	3–1	Bangladesh	Round Robin	N/A
20 February 1982	Iran	4–0	Nepal	Round Robin	N/A
20 February 1982	Pakistan Greens	1–4	(China) Shandong	Round Robin	N/A
21 February 1982	Iran	4–0	Oman	Round Robin	N/A
22 February 1982	(China) Shandong	0–0	Bangladesh	Round Robin	N/A
23 February 1982	Pakistan Blues	0–0	Pakistan Greens	Round Robin	N/A
23 February 1982	Iran	9–0	Bangladesh	Round Robin	N/A
24 February 1982	Pakistan Greens	0–0	Oman	Round Robin	N/A

== See also ==
- List of Test cricket grounds
- List of cricket grounds in Pakistan
- List of sports venues in Karachi
