= Eddie Hemmings (cricketer) =

English cricketer

Personal information
- Full name: Edward Ernest Hemmings
- Born: 20 February 1949 (age 77); Leamington Spa, Warwickshire, England
- Batting: Right-handed
- Bowling: Right-arm offbreak

International information
- National side: England (1982–1991)
- Test debut (cap 497): 29 July 1982 v Pakistan
- Last Test: 4 January 1991 v Australia
- ODI debut (cap 65): 17 July 1982 v Pakistan
- Last ODI: 9 February 1991 v New Zealand

Career statistics
Competition	Test	ODI	FC
Matches	16	33	518
Runs scored	383	30	9,533
Batting average	22.52	5.00	18.54
100s/50s	0/2	0/0	1/27
Top score	95	8*	127*
Balls bowled	4,437	1,752	101,688
Wickets	43	37	1,515
Bowling average	42.44	34.97	29.30
5 wickets in innings	1	0	70
10 wickets in match	0	0	15
Best bowling	6/58	4/52	10/175
Catches/stumpings	5/–	5/–	212/–
Medal record
Men's Cricket
Representing England
ICC Cricket World Cup
Runner-up	1987 India and Pakistan
- Source: CricInfo, 27 November 2017

Edward Ernest Hemmings (born 20 February 1949) is a former English cricketer, who played in 16 Test matches and 33 One Day Internationals for the England cricket team between 1982 and 1991. He made his England debut relatively late in his career, at the age of 33, having predominantly represented Nottinghamshire in the County Championship. His chance came when several England players announced their intention to go on a rebel cricket tour to South Africa. He was a part of the English squad which finished as runners-up at the 1987 Cricket World Cup.

== Life and career ==
Originally operating as a seam bowler for Warwickshire, Hemmings changed to bowling off-spin for Nottinghamshire, which led to Test match appearances from the age of 33.

England test teams at that time used to have one spinner, usually an off spinner since Ray Illingworth's appointment as captain in 1969. Illingworth was himself an off spinner. When Illingworth was sacked, Tony Greig briefly filled this role until he was removed in 1977. For a brief time, the baton was handed to Geoff Miller and then John Emburey filled the role from his debut in 1978 largely uncontested until 1982 when Emburey was banned for joining the South African Breweries tour. This put Hemmings into contention for the off spinner's spot with Vic Marks, both making their Test debuts in 1982. Hemmings then toured Australia that winter, teaming up with Miller in several Ashes Tests. He hit his highest Test score of 95 as a nightwatchman in the fifth test at Sydney, also taking six wickets in the match. Seven and a half years later he would make his other Test half century (51) against India during a last wicket stand with Devon Malcolm.

At Brisbane during the 1982-3 Ashes series, Hemmings was mocked for his ample girth in an incident in which a group of home supporters smuggled a pig into the ground and released it onto the outfield, having scrawled "Eddie" onto one flank and "Botham" onto the other. (Team-mate Ian Botham had also begun to fill out around the waist at this stage of his career.)

A change in England selection policy after this tour saw the spin department filled by left armers such as Phil Edmonds and Nick Cook in 1983. For the arrival of the West Indies in 1984, Pat Pocock was preferred as the England off spinner. With Emburey's ban lifted in 1985, Hemmings was again forced onto the sidelines in the test arena. By 1987 Emburey was not taking as many wickets as expected, and while Emburey kept his place in the team as a masterly containing bowler, Hemmings had a good season, helping Nottinghamshire to a noted double of the County Championship and the NatWest Bank Trophy. A televised man of the match-winning performance in the NatWest quarter-final victory against Derbyshire helped to raise his profile. Hemmings was then recalled to the England squad in the World Cup in 1987 in India and Pakistan, and played alongside Emburey in a number of key fixtures. Hemmings was instrumental in the crucial group-stage win against the West Indies at Jaipur, especially by dismissing the feared West Indies captain Viv Richards. One of the finest moments of Hemmings' ODI career would then come in the semifinals of the tournament where he took 4/52 to curtail India's chase. Hemmings' spell would account for the key wickets of Mohammad Azharuddin, Kapil Dev and Ravi Shastri. Hemmings would also go on to play in the final, which England lost, taking the best bowling figures for any England bowler in the match.

Hemmings also appeared in three Tests that winter, taking his then best Test figures at Sydney (the ground on which he took more of his test wickets than anywhere else), but then lost his place in the side. Earlier that winter he was a bystander in one of the most notorious incidents in Test cricket; he was attempting to deliver the ball when an unseemly row ensued between England captain Mike Gatting and umpire Shakoor Rana.

In county cricket, Hemmings was a useful lower-order batsman, who had made his only first-class century in 1982, a week before his Test debut, making 127 not out (batting at no.9) against Yorkshire. Requiring four runs off the last ball of the Benson & Hedges Cup final in 1989, Hemmings (by now aged 40) struck a boundary off John Lever of Essex to ensure victory for Nottinghamshire. Soon after this win he was reinstated in the England side for the 5th Ashes Test match of the same year at Trent Bridge, thanks in part to the fact that several players had just announced their decision to go on a rebel tour to South Africa, including off-spinner John Emburey. Hemmings took no wickets but had some consolation with the bat, second top-scoring on his home County ground in both England innings. The Australian test attack, impatient to clinch another victory and used to prevailing during a summer in which they regularly humiliated England, was so frustrated by Hemmings' batting that there was a small on field altercation with Australian fast bowler Geoff Lawson just before tea on the fourth day of that match. Hemmings had hit Lawson for several fours in a completely lost cause, the game being well and truly lost for England by this point.

Selected as part of Graham Gooch's touring squad that winter, Hemmings played in one day internationals only – often being the most economical bowler. Hemmings was England's first choice off spinner throughout 1990 as the hot weather demanded England adjust their policy of 4 fast bowlers – which had largely worked during the Caribbean tour.

During the first test against India at Lord's in 1990, Hemmings was famously hit for four consecutive sixes by Kapil Dev from the last four balls of his over. This 24 was the exact amount required for India to avoid the follow on – they were nine wickets down at the time and Kapil Dev did not want to expose Narendra Hirwani to Angus Fraser's next over, as Fraser had Hirwani lbw first ball. (England still won the match.) Hemmings had had a happier match in the previous Test against New Zealand in which (now aged 41) he took his only Test five-wicket haul, figures of 6/58.

Hemmings toured Australia with the full England side in 1990–91 that winter, playing in one test match – his last test match – at Sydney and again featuring as a containing bowler in most of the one day games. England did not make the finals of the World Series Cup. Hemmings last played for England during the short one day international series in New Zealand which followed the Ashes tour.

All in all, Hemmings was probably the second best off-spinner in England from around 1982–1991 and was largely unfortunate that his best years coincided with John Emburey's. He was perhaps underused in one day international cricket, especially given his success in the 1987 world cup and his proficiency in the format; as of 2022 he stands 31st on the list of all-time wicket-takers in List A cricket. There were other contenders for the one place in the England team during the same time such as Geoff Miller, Vic Marks and Pat Pocock. However broadly speaking England selectors preferred their off spinners to be able to bat which explains why Geoff Miller, who had a superior first-class record as a batter, was often selected.

Before retiring from first-class cricket at the age of 46, he also played for Sussex. In his last season he helped the county to inflict a rare innings defeat on the touring West Indies, taking 4/33.

Hemmings holds the record for the most runs conceded by a bowler when taking all ten wickets in an innings – 49.3-14-175-10 for the International XI against a West Indies XI at Kingston, Jamaica in 1982–83.

He now runs a village shop in West Butterwick, Lincolnshire. He has also worked as a talent scout for the ECB.

His niece, Beth Morgan, was also an England Test cricketer.
