= David Archer (umpire) =

West Indian cricketer and umpire

Personal information
- Full name: David Myrton Archer
- Born: 31 August 1931; Barbados
- Died: 24 October 1992 (aged 61); Bridgetown, Barbados
- Batting: Right-handed
- Bowling: Slow left-arm orthodox
- Role: Umpire

Domestic team information
- Years: Team
- 1964/65–1966/67: Windward Islands

Umpiring information
- Tests umpired: 28 (1981–1992)
- ODIs umpired: 24 (1981–1991)

Career statistics
Competition	First-class
Matches	3
Runs scored	17
Batting average	5.66
100s/50s	0/0
Top score	11*
Balls bowled	156
Wickets	1
Bowling average	121.00
5 wickets in innings	0
10 wickets in match	0
Best bowling	1/27
Catches/stumpings	0/–
- Source: Cricinfo, 8 November 2026

David Myrton Archer (20 August 1931 – 24 October 1992) was a West Indian cricketer and umpire. He played first-class cricket for the Windward Islands but is best known for officiating in 28 Test matches in the West Indies from 1981 to 1992.

== Career ==
Born in Barbados, Archer was educated at Combermere School. He was a right-handed batsman and slow left-arm bowler. He is famous for taking 17 wickets in a club match in Barbados, including all ten in one innings. He made three first-class appearances for the Windward Islands. The first came against the touring Australians of 1964–65, when batting at number eleven he scored 11 not out and bowled 10 wicketless overs conceding 50 runs. He played a single match in each of the following two seasons without great success.

Archer took up umpiring, and in February 1976 umpired his maiden first-class game, between Barbados and Jamaica. Five years later he made the step up to international level in a One Day International between England and the West Indies. Later on during England's tour he stood in his first Test.

As well as umpiring in West Indian domestic cricket, Archer also umpired ten matches in England during the 1982 County Championship. In all, he umpired 78 first-class matches between February 1976 and April 1992.

Archer was selected as the West Indian representative for the 1987 World Cup staged in Asia. He stood in five matches in the tournament, which was the first major trial of neutral umpires. His final international umpiring appearance came in April 1992 when he stood in South Africa's first Test back after re-admission, which was also the first-ever Test between South Africa and the West Indies.

Archer was a publican who ran the Umpires Inn in Barbados. He died in a hospital in Barbados after a short illness six months after his last Test match.
