= Mahboob Shah =

Pakistani cricket umpire

Personal information
- Full name: Syed Mahboob Ali Shah
- Born: 13 October 1938 (age 88); Delhi, British India
- Batting: Right-handed
- Bowling: Right-arm medium fast
- Role: Umpire

Domestic team information
- Years: Team
- 1954/55: Balochistan
- 1956/57: Karachi Whites
- 1959/60: Quetta
- 1959–1961: Karachi University

Umpiring information
- Tests umpired: 28 (1975–1997)
- ODIs umpired: 34 (1976–1996)

Career statistics
| Competition | First-class |
|---|---|
| Matches | 14 |
| Runs scored | 422 |
| Batting average | 21.10 |
| 100s/50s | 1/0 |
| Top score | 152 |
| Balls bowled | – |
| Wickets | 12 |
| Bowling average | 22.58 |
| 5 wickets in innings | 1 |
| 10 wickets in match | 0 |
| Best bowling | 6/14 |
| Catches/stumpings | 7/– |
- Source: Cricinfo, 13 July 2013

Syed Mahboob Ali Shah (born 13 October 1938) is a Pakistani former first-class cricketer and Test cricket umpire.

== Early life and education ==
Syed Mahboob Ali Shah was born on 13 October 1938 in Delhi, British India. His family moved from Delhi to Lahore and finally settled in Quetta after the partition of India. Shah completed his matriculation in Quetta and later obtained his B.A. and L.L.B. from Urdu College, Karachi, in 1958 and 1962, respectively.

== Cricket career ==
Shah began his cricket career in the 1950s as a right-arm medium-fast bowler before transitioning to a middle-order batsman. He made his first-class debut in the 1954-55 Quaid-e-Azam Trophy for Baluchistan. Shah later represented Karachi Whites and achieved notable performances, including an unbeaten 250 for Urdu College in the Karachi University Championship.

He played in 14 first-class matches for Baluchistan, Central Zone, Karachi Whites, Karachi C, Quetta and Karachi University between 1954/55 and 1960/61. He reached the final of the Quaid-e-Azam Trophy in 1957/58 with Karachi C, losing to Bahawalpur. He achieved a batting average of 21.10 in 21 innings, including a high score of 152, his only first-class century, for Karachi University against Sindh University in February 1960; as a medium-fast bowler, he took 12 wickets at a bowling average of 22.58, including 6/14 for Karachi C against Sind A in October 1957.

== Umpiring ==
Shah umpired 28 Test matches and 32 ODIs between March 1975 and March 1997, mainly in Pakistan – only four of his Test matches were overseas. He made his Test umpiring debut in March 1975, in the second Test between Pakistan and the West Indies at the National Stadium, Karachi. He regularly officiated in Test matches in Pakistan from 1978 to 1990. In 1994, he and Khizer Hayat were the two Pakistani representatives on the first international panel of umpires, set up by the ICC to ensure that one neutral umpire would stand in every Test match (later supplemented by the Elite Panel of ICC Umpires). He stood in his first Test outside Pakistan in March 1994, in the third Test between South Africa and Australia at Kingsmead, Durban. His final Test was the second Test between New Zealand and Sri Lanka at Trust Bank Park (a.k.a. Seddon Park), Hamilton, in March 1997.

He made his ODI debut as an umpire in the match between Pakistan and New Zealand at Jinnah Stadium, Sialkot on 16 October 1976. He umpired in the 1987 Cricket World Cup in India, including the final between Australia and England at Eden Gardens, Calcutta, on 8 November 1987, and in the 1996 Cricket World Cup in Sri Lanka and Pakistan. His last ODI was the third match in the Pakistan and New Zealand series, at National Stadium, Karachi, on 8 December 1996.

== See also ==
- List of Test cricket umpires
- List of One Day International cricket umpires
