= 1987 Cricket World Cup =

Fourth edition of the Cricket World Cup

- Dates: 8 October – 8 November 1987
- Administrator: International Cricket Conference
- Cricket format: One Day International
- Tournament format(s): Double round-robin and Knockout
- Hosts: India; Pakistan
- Champions: Australia (1st title)
- Runners-up: England
- Participants: 8
- Matches: 27
- Most runs: (England) Graham Gooch (471)
- Most wickets: (Australia) Craig McDermott (18)

The 1987 Cricket World Cup (officially known as the Reliance Cup 1987 for sponsorship reasons) was the fourth Cricket World Cup. It was held from 8 October to 8 November 1987 in India and Pakistan – the first such tournament to be held outside England. The one-day format was unchanged from the eight-team 1983 event except for a reduction in the number of overs a team played from 60 to 50, the current standard for all ODIs.

The competition was won, for the first time, by Australia who defeated their arch-rivals England by seven runs in the second-most closely fought World Cup final to date in Kolkata's Eden Gardens stadium. The two host nations, India and Pakistan failed to reach the final, after both being eliminated in the semi-finals. The West Indies failed to live up to expectations and did not advance from the group stage.

== Format ==
The format of the competition was two groups of four teams each team playing each other twice in 50-over matches. The top two teams from each group would advance to the semi-finals where the two winners would then advance to the final. All matches were played during daytime and– for the final time in the tournament's history– saw the teams appear in traditional white clothing and use traditional red balls as used in Test/First Class matches.

== Qualification ==
The ICC decreed that all seven eligible countries holding Test status would automatically qualify for the tournament. One additional place would be awarded to the winners of the 1986 ICC Trophy. For the second consecutive tournament this was Zimbabwe, who defeated the Netherlands.

Highlighted are the countries to participate in the 1987 Cricket World Cup. Qualified as full member of ICC Qualified via 1986 ICC Trophy Failed to qualify

The following eight teams participated in the tournament:

- Australia
- England
- India (co-hosts)
- New Zealand
- Pakistan (co-hosts)
- Sri Lanka
- West Indies
- Zimbabwe

== Venues ==
Venues in India
Venues in Pakistan

Venue	City	Capacity	Matches
India
Eden Gardens	Calcutta, West Bengal	120,000	2
Wankhede Stadium	Bombay, Maharashtra	45,000	2
M. A. Chidambaram Stadium	Madras, Tamil Nadu	50,000	2
Lal Bahadur Shastri Stadium	Hyderabad, Andhra Pradesh	30,000	1
M. Chinnaswamy Stadium	Bangalore, Karnataka	45,000	1
Nehru Stadium	Indore, Madhya Pradesh	25,000	1
Arun Jaitley Ground	Delhi	48,000	1
Sardar Patel Stadium	Ahmedabad, Gujarat	48,000	1
Sector 16 Stadium	Chandigarh, Punjab-Haryana	48,000	1
Barabati Stadium	Cuttack, Odisha	25,000	1
Vidarbha Cricket Association Ground	Nagpur, Maharashtra	40,000	1
Green Park	Kanpur, Uttar Pradesh	40,000	1
Sawai Mansingh Stadium	Jaipur, Rajasthan	30,000	1
Nehru Stadium	Pune, Maharashtra	25,000	1
Pakistan
Iqbal Stadium	Faisalabad, Punjab	25,000	1
Municipal Stadium	Gujranwala, Punjab	20,000	1
Niaz Stadium	Hyderabad, Sindh	15,000	1
National Stadium	Karachi, Sindh	45,000	3
Gaddafi Stadium	Lahore, Punjab	35,000	2
Arbab Niaz Stadium	Peshawar, Khyber Pakhtunkhwa	25,000	1
Pindi Club Ground	Rawalpindi, Punjab	25,000	1

== Group stage ==
=== Group A ===
Pos	Team	Pld	W	L	T	NR	Pts	RR
1	India	6	5	1	0	0	20	5.413
2	Australia	6	5	1	0	0	20	5.193
3	New Zealand	6	2	4	0	0	8	4.887
4	Zimbabwe	6	0	6	0	0	0	3.757

Source: ESPNcricinfo, The Age

9 October 1987
Scorecard

Australia; 270/6 (50 overs)	v	India; 269 (49.5 overs)

Australia won by 1 run
MA Chidambaram Stadium, Madras, India

10 October 1987
Scorecard

New Zealand; 242/7 (50 overs)	v	Zimbabwe; 239 (49.4 overs)

New Zealand won by 3 runs
Lal Bahadur Shastri Stadium, Hyderabad, India

13 October 1987
Scorecard

Australia; 235/9 (50 overs)	v	Zimbabwe; 139 (42.4 overs)

Australia won by 96 runs
MA Chidambaram Stadium, Madras, India

14 October 1987
Scorecard

India; 252/7 (50 overs)	v	New Zealand; 236/8 (50 overs)

India won by 16 runs
M. Chinnaswamy Stadium, Bangalore, India

17 October 1987
Scorecard

Zimbabwe; 135 (44.2 overs)	v	India; 136/2 (27.5 overs)

India won by 8 wickets
Wankhede Stadium, Bombay, India

18 October 1987
Scorecard

Australia; 199/4 (30 overs)	v	New Zealand; 196/9 (30 overs)

Australia won by 3 runs
Nehru Stadium, Indore, India

22 October 1987
Scorecard

India; 289/6 (50 overs)	v	Australia; 233 (49 overs)

India won by 56 runs
Feroz Shah Kotla, Delhi, India

23 October 1987
Scorecard

Zimbabwe; 227/5 (50 overs)	v	New Zealand; 228/6 (47.4 overs)

New Zealand won by 4 wickets
Eden Gardens, Calcutta, India

26 October 1987
Scorecard

Zimbabwe; 191/7 (50 overs)	v	India; 194/3 (42 overs)

India won by 7 wickets
Sardar Patel Stadium, Ahmedabad, India

27 October 1987
Scorecard

Australia; 251/8 (50 overs)	v	New Zealand; 234 (48.4 overs)

Australia won by 17 runs
Sector 16 Stadium, Chandigarh, India

30 October 1987
Scorecard

Australia; 266/5 (50 overs)	v	Zimbabwe; 196/6 (50 overs)

Australia won by 70 runs
Barabati Stadium, Cuttack, India

31 October 1987
Scorecard

New Zealand; 221/9 (50 overs)	v	India; 224/1 (32.1 overs)

India won by 9 wickets
VCA Ground, Nagpur, India

=== Group B ===
Pos	Team	Pld	W	L	T	NR	Pts	RR
1	Pakistan	6	5	1	0	0	20	5.007
2	England	6	4	2	0	0	16	5.140
3	West Indies	6	3	3	0	0	12	5.160
4	Sri Lanka	6	0	6	0	0	0	4.041

Source: ESPNcricinfo, The Age

8 October 1987
Scorecard

Pakistan; 267/6 (50 overs)	v	Sri Lanka; 252 (49.2 overs)

Pakistan won by 15 runs
Niaz Stadium, Hyderabad, Pakistan

9 October 1987
Scorecard

West Indies; 243/7 (50 overs)	v	England; 246/8 (49.3 overs)

England won by 2 wickets
Municipal Stadium, Gujranwala, Pakistan

13 October 1987^{1}
Scorecard

Pakistan; 239/7 (50 overs)	v	England; 221 (48.4 overs)

Pakistan won by 18 runs
Pindi Club Ground, Rawalpindi, Pakistan

13 October 1987
Scorecard

West Indies; 360/4 (50 overs)	v	Sri Lanka; 169/4 (50 overs)

West Indies won by 191 runs
National Stadium, Karachi, Pakistan

16 October 1987
Scorecard

West Indies; 216 (49.3 overs)	v	Pakistan; 217/9 (50 overs)

Pakistan won by 1 wicket
Gaddafi Stadium, Lahore

17 October 1987
Scorecard

England; 296/4 (50 overs)	v	Sri Lanka; 158/8 (45 overs)^{2}

England won by 108 runs
Arbab Niaz Stadium, Peshawar, Pakistan

20 October 1987
Scorecard

England; 244/9 (50 overs)	v	Pakistan; 247/3 (49 overs)

Pakistan won by 7 wickets
National Stadium, Karachi, Pakistan

21 October 1987
Scorecard

West Indies; 236/8 (50 overs)	v	Sri Lanka; 211/8 (50 overs)

West Indies won by 25 runs
Green Park, Kanpur, India

25 October 1987
Scorecard

Pakistan; 297/7 (50 overs)	v	Sri Lanka; 184/8 (50 overs)

Pakistan won by 113 runs
Iqbal Stadium, Faisalabad, Pakistan

26 October 1987
Scorecard

England; 269/5 (50 overs)	v	West Indies; 235 (48.1 overs)

England won by 34 runs
Sawai Mansingh Stadium, Jaipur, India

30 October 1987
Scorecard

Sri Lanka; 218/7 (50 overs)	v	England; 219/2 (41.2 overs)

England won by 8 wickets
Nehru Stadium, Poona, India

30 October 1987
Scorecard

West Indies; 258/7 (50 overs)	v	Pakistan; 230/9 (50 overs)

West Indies won by 28 runs
National Stadium, Karachi, Pakistan

- Note 1: This match was scheduled for 12 October but abandoned without play due to rain. The reserve day was instead used.
- Note 2: Rain interrupted the Sri Lanka innings; their target was reduced to 267 in 45 overs by the Average Run Rate method.

== Knockout stage ==
Semi-finals
4 November – Lahore, Pakistan
Australia	267/8
Pakistan	249
5 November – Bombay, India
England	254/6
India	219

Final
8 November – Calcutta, India
Australia	253/5
England	246/8

=== Semi-finals ===
Australia won the toss and chose to bat. The Australian batsmen got off to a very good start, and they scored fluently, with David Boon (65 from 91 balls, 4 fours) top scoring, and making an 82 run second-wicket partnership with DM Jones. Australia were looking to reach 300 with strong batting before Imran Khan took 3 wickets for 17 runs in 5 overs. Australia lost 4/31, but a high number of extras (34) from the Pakistani bowlers, as well as the solid batting from earlier on, brought Australia to 267 (8 wickets, 50 overs). Pakistan started badly, falling to 3/38. Imran Khan (58 from 84 balls, 4 fours) and Javed Miandad (70 from 103 balls, 4 fours) shared a partnership of 112 runs in 26 overs. However, with the required run rate at 7.87 runs when Miandad fell, there was just too much for the upcoming batsmen to do, and Pakistan lost 6/99 as they were bowled all out for 249 (all out, 49 overs). Earlier Steve Waugh scored 18 runs off the 50th over bowled by Saleem Jaffar and ironically Pakistan lost the match by 18 runs.

4 November 1987
Scorecard

Australia; 267/8 (50 overs)	v	Pakistan; 249 (49 overs)

Australia won by 18 runs
Gaddafi Stadium, Lahore, Pakistan

India won the toss and chose to field. After reaching 2/79, Graham Gooch (115 from 136 balls, 11 fours) and captain Mike Gatting (56 from 62 balls, 5 fours) shared a partnership of 117 runs in 19 overs. After Gooch was finally stumped, 51 more runs were added, and England reached 254 (6 wickets, 50 overs). India made a bad start, falling to 3/73. The middle order scored fluently, with Mohammed Azharuddin, (64 from 74 balls, 7 fours) top scoring. Before Azharuddin was removed lbw by Eddie Hemmings, India were at 5/204, needing 50 runs from the last 10 overs, with 5 wickets in hand, and it looked like it would be a very close game. However, the middle and tailend order for India collapsed, as India lost 5/15. India were eventually bowled all out for 219 (all out, 45.3 overs), giving England both a berth in the final and a measure of revenge for the loss they suffered to India in the semi-final of the World Cup four years earlier in England.

5 November 1987
Scorecard

England; 254/6 (50 overs)	v	India; 219 (45.3 overs)

England won by 35 runs
Wankhede Stadium, Bombay, India

=== Final ===
Australia won the toss and chose to bat. David Boon (75 from 125 balls, 7 fours) top-scored for Australia, whose batsmen scored fluently. Australia posted 253 (5 wickets, 50 overs). Mike Veletta (45 from 31 balls, 6 fours) cut loose late in the innings, as Australia scored 65 runs from the last six overs of their innings. In the English reply, opener Tim Robinson was out LBW for a first ball duck. Bill Athey (58 from 103 balls, 2 fours) top-scored, and England were almost on target, when captain Mike Gatting (41 from 45 balls, 3 fours, 1 six) handed back the initiative with the loss of his wicket, going for a reverse sweep which ended a growing partnership of 69 runs in 13 overs between him and Athey. Allan Lamb (45 from 55 balls, 4 fours) also posted a great innings, but it was in vain as the required run-rate for England began to rise. When England failed to score the last 17 runs from the final over, the cup went to Australia.

8 November 1987
Scorecard

Australia; 253/5 (50 overs)	v	England; 246/8 (50 overs)

Australia won by 7 runs
Eden Gardens, Calcutta, India

== Statistics ==
Leading run scorers
Matches	Player	Team	Runs
8	Graham Gooch	England	471
8	David Boon	Australia	447
8	Geoff Marsh	Australia	428
6	Viv Richards	West Indies	391
8	Mike Gatting	England	354

Leading wicket takers
Matches	Player	Team	Wickets
8	Craig McDermott	Australia	18
7	Imran Khan	Pakistan	17
6	Patrick Patterson	West Indies	14
7	Maninder Singh	India	14
6	Eddie Hemmings	England	13

The first hat-trick in Cricket World Cup history was taken by Chetan Sharma of India during their final group match against New Zealand. He clean bowled Ken Rutherford, Ian Smith and Ewen Chatfield with the last three balls of the 42nd over.
