= P. W. Vidanagamage =

Sri Lankan cricket umpire (1934–2013)

Personal information
- Full name: Piyadasa Wewa Vidanagamage
- Born: 22 February 1934; Colombo, Sri Lanka
- Died: 24 August 2013 (aged 79); England

Umpiring information
- Tests umpired: 4 (1984–1987)
- ODIs umpired: 23 (1982–1991)
- Source: Cricinfo, 15 July 2013

P. W. Vidanagamage (22 February 1934 – 24 August 2013) was a Sri Lankan cricket umpire. He stood in four Test matches between 1984 and 1987 and 23 ODI games between 1982 and 1991.

== See also ==
- List of Test cricket umpires
- List of One Day International cricket umpires
