= List of One Day International cricket grounds =

List of cricket grounds

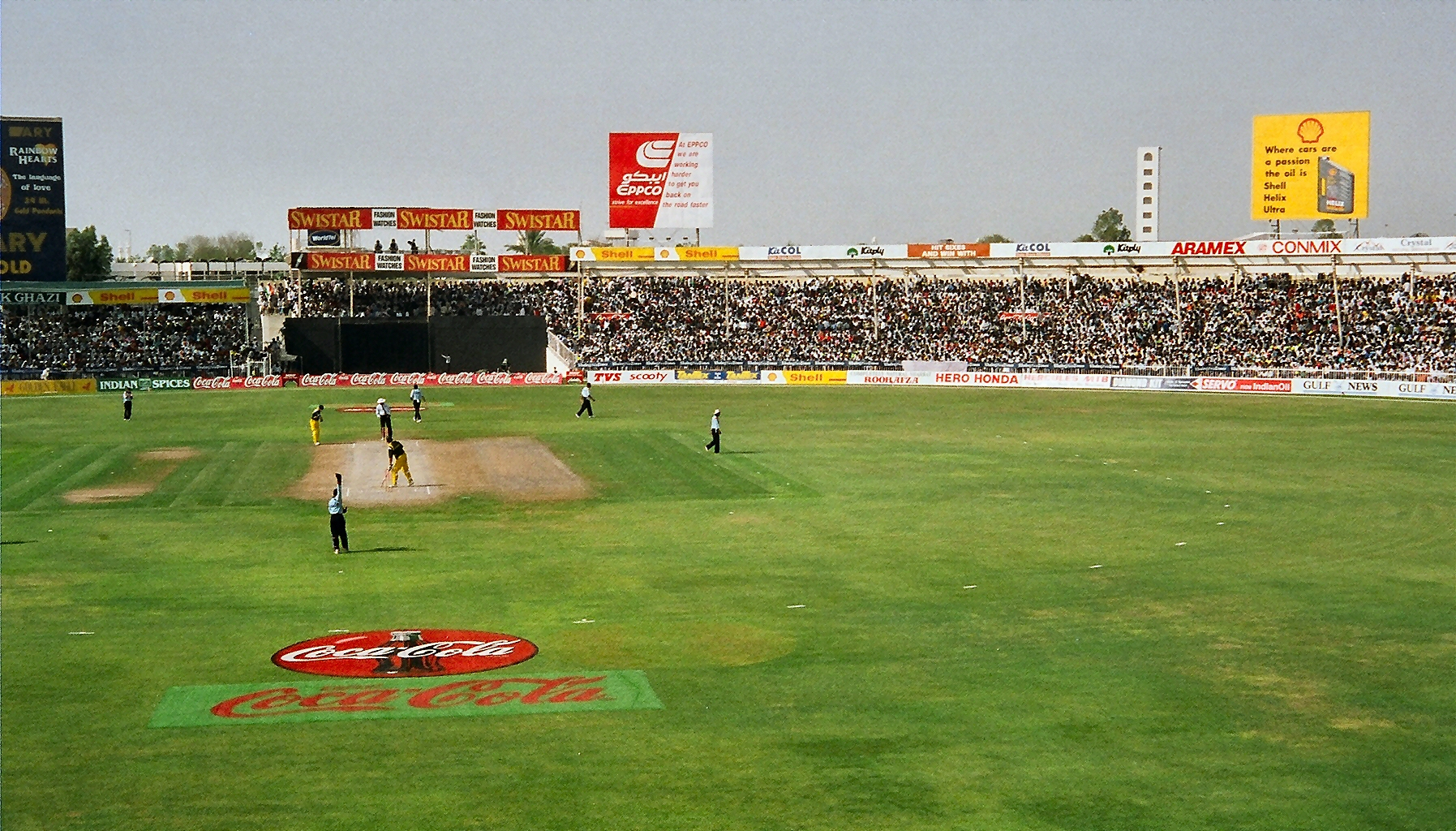
Sharjah Cricket Stadium in Sharjah has hosted more one day international matches than any other cricket ground.

This is a list of One-Day International cricket grounds. A total of 226 grounds have hosted men's One-day Internationals since the first match in January 1971. The grounds are listed in the order in which they were first used as a venue for ODI cricket. The list excludes World Series Cricket and South African rebel tours venues. The UDST Cricket Ground in Doha became the 226th ODI venue when it hosted a match between Nepal and United Arab Emirates during the 2026 Asia Cup Rising Stars on 22 November 2026.

== One Day International cricket grounds ==
As on 22 November 2026 (ODI 5067):

No.	Stadium	City	Country	First match	Last match	No. of ODIs
1	Melbourne Cricket Ground	Melbourne	(Australia) Australia	5 January 1971	4 November 2024	152
2	Old Trafford Cricket Ground	Manchester	(England) England	24 August 1972	22 July 2022	57
3	Lord's	London	(England) England	26 August 1972	19 July 2026	72
4	Edgbaston Cricket Ground	Birmingham	(England) England	28 August 1972	14 July 2026	66
5	Lancaster Park	Christchurch	(New Zealand) New Zealand	11 February 1973	29 January 2011	48
6	St. Helen's Rugby and Cricket Ground	Swansea	(Wales) Wales	18 July 1973	9 June 1983	2
7	Headingley Cricket Ground	Leeds	(England) England	5 September 1973	24 September 2026	49
8	The Oval	London	(England) England	7 September 1973	27 September 2026	77
9	Carisbrook	Dunedin	(New Zealand) New Zealand	30 March 1974	25 February 2004	21
10	Trent Bridge	Nottingham	(England) England	31 August 1974	19 September 2024	51
11	Basin Reserve	Wellington	(New Zealand) New Zealand	9 March 1975	5 January 2025	31
12	Adelaide Oval	Adelaide	(Australia) Australia	20 December 1975	15 November 2026	89
13	Eden Park	Auckland	(New Zealand) New Zealand	22 February 1976	11 April 2026	82
14	North Marine Road Ground	Scarborough	(England) England	26 August 1976	15 July 1978	2
15	Jinnah Stadium	Sialkot	(Pakistan) Pakistan	16 October 1976	6 December 1996	9
16	Albion Sports Complex	Albion	(Guyana) Guyana	16 March 1977	14 April 1985	5
17	Zafar Ali Stadium	Sahiwal	(Pakistan) Pakistan	23 December 1977	3 November 1978	2
18	Gaddafi Stadium	Lahore	(Pakistan) Pakistan	13 January 1978	31 October 2026	79
19	Antigua Recreation Ground	St. John's	(Antigua and Barbuda) Antigua and Barbuda	22 February 1978	28 February 2007	11
20	Mindoo Phillip Park	Castries	(Saint Lucia) Saint Lucia	12 April 1978	19 April 1984	2
21	Ayub National Stadium	Quetta	(Pakistan) Pakistan	1 October 1978	12 October 1984	2
22	Sydney Cricket Ground	Sydney	(Australia) Australia	13 January 1979	25 October 2025	162
23	The Gabba	Brisbane	(Australia) Australia	23 December 1979	19 January 2018	78
24	National Stadium	Karachi	(Pakistan) Pakistan	21 November 1980	1 March 2025	59
25	WACA Ground	Perth	(Australia) Australia	9 December 1980	19 January 2017	80
26	Arnos Vale Stadium	Kingstown	(Saint Vincent and the Grenadines) Saint Vincent and the Grenadines	4 February 1981	20 March 2012	23
27	Seddon Park	Hamilton	(New Zealand) New Zealand	15 February 1981	10 November 2026	44
28	Sardar Vallabhbhai Patel Stadium	Ahmedabad	(India) India	25 November 1981	25 November 1981	1
29	Gandhi Stadium	Jalandhar	(India) India	20 December 1981	20 February 1984	3
30	Barabati Stadium	Cuttack	(India) India	27 January 1982	9 February 2025	20
31	Sinhalese Sports Club Ground (SSC)	Colombo	(Sri Lanka) Sri Lanka	13 February 1982	22 February 2020	61
32	Gandhi Sports Complex Ground	Amritsar	(India) India	12 September 1982	18 November 1995	2
33	Arun Jaitley Stadium	New Delhi	(India) India	15 September 1982	6 November 2023	31
34	Niaz Stadium	Hyderabad	(Pakistan) Pakistan	20 September 1982	24 January 2008	7
35	M. Chinnaswamy Stadium	Bangalore	(India) India	26 September 1982	12 November 2023	31
36	Jinnah Stadium	Gujranwala	(Pakistan) Pakistan	3 December 1982	16 February 2000	11
37	Ibn-e-Qasim Bagh Stadium	Multan	(Pakistan) Pakistan	17 December 1982	14 October 1994	6
38	Queen's Park Oval	Port of Spain	(Trinidad and Tobago) Trinidad and Tobago	9 March 1983	29 July 2022	72
39	McLean Park	Napier	(New Zealand) New Zealand	19 March 1983	19 November 2025	47
40	Queen's Park (Old)	St. George's	(Grenada) Grenada	7 April 1983	7 April 1983	1
41	Paikiasothy Saravanamuttu Stadium	Colombo	(Sri Lanka) Sri Lanka	13 April 1983	20 July 2007	12
42	County Ground	Taunton	(England) England	11 June 1983	17 June 2019	6
43	Grace Road	Leicester	(England) England	11 June 1983	27 May 1999	3
44	Bristol County Ground	Bristol	(England) England	13 June 1983	29 September 2024	21
45	New Road	Worcester	(England) England	13 June 1983	22 May 1999	3
46	County Ground	Southampton	(England) England	16 June 1983	30 May 1999	3
47	Nevill Ground	Royal Tunbridge Wells	(England) England	18 June 1983	18 June 1983	1
48	County Cricket Ground	Derby	(England) England	18 June 1983	28 May 1999	2
49	County Ground	Chelmsford	(England) England	20 June 1983	14 May 2023	6
50	Lal Bahadur Shastri Stadium	Hyderabad	(India) India	10 September 1983	15 October 2003	14
51	Sawai Mansingh Stadium	Jaipur	(India) India	2 October 1983	16 October 2013	19
52	Sher-i-Kashmir Stadium	Srinagar	(India) India	13 October 1983	9 September 1986	2
53	Moti Bagh Stadium	Vadodara	(India) India	9 November 1983	17 December 1988	3
54	Nehru Stadium	Indore	(India) India	1 December 1983	31 March 2001	9
55	Keenan Stadium	Jamshedpur	(India) India	7 December 1983	12 April 2006	10
56	Nehru Stadium	Guwahati	(India) India	17 December 1983	28 November 2010	14
57	Tyronne Fernando Stadium	Moratuwa	(Sri Lanka) Sri Lanka	31 March 1984	14 August 1993	6
58	Sharjah Cricket Stadium	Sharjah	(United Arab Emirates) UAE	6 April 1984	23 October 2026	257
59	Sabina Park	Kingston	(Jamaica) Jamaica	26 April 1984	6 June 2026	43
60	Jawaharlal Nehru Stadium	New Delhi	(India) India	28 September 1984	14 October 1991	2
61	University Stadium	Trivandrum	(India) India	1 October 1984	25 January 1988	2
62	Narendra Modi Stadium	Ahmedabad	(India) India	5 October 1984	12 February 2025	32
63	Arbab Niaz Stadium	Peshawar	(Pakistan) Pakistan	2 November 1984	6 February 2006	15
64	Iqbal Stadium	Faisalabad	(Pakistan) Pakistan	23 November 1984	8 November 2025	19
65	Nehru Stadium	Pune	(India) India	5 December 1984	3 November 2005	11
66	Tasmania Cricket Association Ground	Hobart	(Australia) Australia	10 January 1985	10 January 1985	1
67	Vidarbha Cricket Association Ground	Nagpur	(India) India	23 January 1985	14 October 2007	14
68	Sector 16 Stadium	Chandigarh	(India) India	27 January 1985	8 October 2007	5
69	Kensington Oval	Bridgetown	(Barbados) Barbados	23 April 1985	21 July 2026	51
70	Pindi Club Ground	Rawalpindi	(Pakistan) Pakistan	4 December 1985	12 October 1987	2
71	North Tasmania Cricket Association Ground	Launceston	(Australia) Australia	2 February 1986	2 February 1986	1
72	Asgiriya Stadium	Kandy	(Sri Lanka) Sri Lanka	2 March 1986	16 December 2001	6
73	Ranasinghe Premadasa Stadium	Colombo	(Sri Lanka) Sri Lanka	5 April 1986	27 January 2026	157
74	Madhavrao Scindia Cricket Ground	Rajkot	(India) India	7 October 1986	15 December 2009	12
75	Green Park Stadium	Kanpur	(India) India	24 December 1986	15 December 2009	15
76	Wankhede Stadium	Mumbai	(India) India	17 January 1987	15 November 2023	28
77	Devonport Oval	Devonport	(Australia) Australia	3 February 1987	3 February 1987	1
78	Eden Gardens	Kolkata	(India) India	18 February 1987	16 November 2023	36
79	M. A. Chidambaram Stadium	Chennai	(India) India	9 October 1987	20 June 2026	29
80	Bellerive Oval	Hobart	(Australia) Australia	12 January 1988	18 November 2026	37
81	Nahar Singh Stadium	Faridabad	(India) India	19 January 1988	31 March 2006	8
82	Captain Roop Singh Stadium	Gwalior	(India) India	22 January 1988	24 February 2010	12
83	Bourda	Georgetown	(Guyana) Guyana	30 March 1988	7 May 2006	11
84	MA Aziz Stadium	Chittagong	(Bangladesh) Bangladesh	27 October 1988	26 January 2005	10
85	Bangabandhu National Stadium	Dhaka	(Bangladesh) Bangladesh	27 October 1988	31 January 2005	58
86	Indira Priyadarshini Stadium	Visakhapatnam	(India) India	10 December 1988	3 April 2001	5
87	Brabourne Stadium	Mumbai	(India) India	23 October 1989	29 October 2018	9
88	Nehru Stadium	Fatorda	(India) India	25 October 1989	24 October 2010	7
89	K.D. Singh Babu Stadium	Lucknow	(India) India	27 October 1989	27 October 1989	1
90	Sargodha Cricket Stadium	Sargodha	(Pakistan) Pakistan	10 January 1992	10 January 1992	1
91	Rawalpindi Cricket Stadium	Rawalpindi	(Pakistan) Pakistan	19 January 1992	22 October 2026	32
92	Pukekura Park	New Plymouth	(New Zealand) New Zealand	23 February 1992	23 February 1992	1
93	Great Barrier Reef Arena	Mackay	(Australia) Australia	28 February 1992	24 August 2025	3
94	Eastern Oval	Ballarat	(Australia) Australia	9 March 1992	9 March 1992	1
95	Manuka Oval	Canberra	(Australia) Australia	10 March 1992	6 February 2024	11
96	Berri Oval	Berri	(Australia) Australia	13 March 1992	13 March 1992	1
97	Lavington Sports Oval	Albury	(Australia) Australia	18 March 1992	18 March 1992	1
98	Harare Sports Club	Harare	(Zimbabwe) Zimbabwe	25 October 1992	20 September 2026	196
99	Bulawayo Athletic Club	Bulawayo	(Zimbabwe) Zimbabwe	31 October 1992	27 June 2023	9
100	Newlands	Cape Town	(South Africa) South Africa	7 December 1992	19 December 2024	45
101	St George's Park	Gqeberha	(South Africa) South Africa	9 December 1992	19 December 2023	43
102	Centurion Park (SuperSport Park)	Centurion	(South Africa) South Africa	11 December 1992	15 September 2023	60
103	Wanderers Stadium	Johannesburg	(South Africa) South Africa	13 December 1992	27 September 2026	56
104	Mangaung Oval	Bloemfontein	(South Africa) South Africa	15 December 1992	9 September 2023	34
105	Kingsmead	Durban	(South Africa) South Africa	17 December 1992	24 September 2026	48
106	Buffalo Park	East London	(South Africa) South Africa	19 December 1992	18 March 2023	23
107	Moin-ul-Haq Stadium	Patna	(India) India	15 November 1993	27 February 1996	3
108	Punjab Cricket Association Stadium	Mohali	(India) India	22 November 1993	22 September 2023	26
109	Reliance Stadium	Vadodara	(India) India	28 October 1994	4 December 2010	10
110	Singapore Cricket Club Ground	Singapore	(Singapore) Singapore	1 April 1996	7 April 1996	4
111	Toronto Cricket, Skating and Curling Club Ground	Toronto	(Canada) Canada	16 September 1996	9 August 2011	30
112	Gymkhana Club Ground	Nairobi	(Kenya) Kenya	28 September 1996	11 October 2010	62
113	Nairobi Club Ground	Nairobi	(Kenya) Kenya	1 October 1996	1 October 1996	1
114	Aga Khan Sports Club Ground	Nairobi	(Kenya) Kenya	2 October 1996	16 October 1997	4
115	Bugti Stadium	Quetta	(Pakistan) Pakistan	30 October 1996	30 October 1996	1
116	Queens Sports Club	Bulawayo	(Zimbabwe) Zimbabwe	15 December 1996	28 November 2024	93
117	Boland Park	Paarl	(South Africa) South Africa	27 January 1997	17 December 2024	17
118	Willowmoore Park	Benoni	(South Africa) South Africa	9 February 1997	5 April 2023	22
119	Nehru Stadium	Kochi	(India) India	1 April 1998	8 October 2014	9
120	De Beers Diamond Oval	Kimberley	(South Africa) South Africa	7 April 1998	1 February 2023	15
121	Sheikhupura Stadium	Sheikhupura	(Pakistan) Pakistan	22 November 1998	2 February 2008	2
122	Owen Delany Park	Taupō	(New Zealand) New Zealand	9 January 1999	2 January 2001	3
123	National Cricket Stadium	St. George's	(Grenada) Grenada	14 April 1999	12 January 2020	24
124	County Cricket Ground	Hove	(England) England	15 May 1999	15 May 1999	1
125	St. Lawrence Ground	Canterbury	(England) England	18 May 1999	30 June 2005	4
126	County Ground	Northampton	(England) England	19 May 1999	31 May 1999	2
127	Sophia Gardens	Cardiff	(Wales) Wales	20 May 1999	16 July 2026	32
128	Riverside Ground	Chester-le-Street	(England) England	20 May 1999	22 September 2026	23
129	Clontarf Cricket Club Ground (Castle Avenue)	Dublin	(Republic of Ireland) Ireland	21 May 1999	25 May 2025	28
130	Grange CC Ground	Edinburgh	(Scotland) Scotland	24 May 1999	31 July 2022	22
131	VRA Cricket Ground	Amstelveen	(Netherlands) Netherlands	26 May 1999	10 May 2025	31
132	Galle International Stadium	Galle	(Sri Lanka) Sri Lanka	22 August 1999	2 July 2017	6
133	Kallang Ground	Singapore	(Singapore) Singapore	2 September 1999	27 August 2000	10
134	Westpac Stadium	Wellington	(New Zealand) New Zealand	8 January 2000	7 November 2026	33
135	Marvel Stadium	Melbourne	(Australia) Australia	16 August 2000	3 February 2006	12
136	JB Marks Oval (Senwes Park/Sedgars Park)	Potchefstroom	(South Africa) South Africa	20 October 2000	30 September 2026	22
137	Barkatullah Khan Stadium	Jodhpur	(India) India	8 December 2000	21 November 2002	2
138	Rangiri Dambulla International Stadium	Dambulla	(Sri Lanka) Sri Lanka	23 March 2001	13 November 2024	56
139	Simba Union Ground	Nairobi	(Kenya) Kenya	15 August 2001	15 August 2001	1
140	Darren Sammy National Cricket Stadium	Gros Islet	(Saint Lucia) Saint Lucia	8 June 2002	2 March 2019	30
141	National Cricket Stadium	Tangier	(Morocco) Morocco	12 August 2002	21 August 2002	7
142	Indira Gandhi Stadium	Vijayawada	(India) India	24 November 2002	24 November 2002	1
143	Kwekwe Sports Club	Kwekwe	(Zimbabwe) Zimbabwe	11 December 2002	11 December 2002	1
144	John Davies Oval	Queenstown	(New Zealand) New Zealand	4 January 2003	1 January 2014	9
145	City Oval (Alexandra Park)	Pietermaritzburg	(South Africa) South Africa	14 February 2003	23 February 2003	2
146	Rose Bowl (The Ageas Bowl)	Southampton	(England) England	10 July 2003	7 September 2025	32
147	Cazalys Stadium	Cairns	(Australia) Australia	2 August 2003	19 August 2025	6
148	Marrara Oval	Darwin	(Australia) Australia	6 August 2003	6 September 2008	4
149	Multan Cricket Stadium	Multan	(Pakistan) Pakistan	9 September 2003	30 August 2023	11
150	ACA–VDCA Cricket Stadium	Visakhapatnam	(India) India	5 April 2005	6 December 2025	11
151	Rajiv Gandhi International Cricket Stadium	Hyderabad	(India) India	16 November 2005	10 October 2023	10
152	Shaheed Chandu Stadium	Bogra	(Bangladesh) Bangladesh	20 February 2006	5 December 2006	5
153	Zohur Ahmed Chowdhury Stadium	Chittagong	(Bangladesh) Bangladesh	25 February 2006	23 April 2026	32
154	Sheikh Abu Naser Stadium	Khulna	(Bangladesh) Bangladesh	20 March 2006	2 December 2012	4
155	Fatullah Osmani Stadium	Fatullah	(Bangladesh) Bangladesh	23 March 2006	1 March 2014	10
156	Holkar Cricket Stadium	Indore	(India) India	15 April 2006	18 January 2026	8
157	Sheikh Zayed Cricket Stadium	Abu Dhabi	(United Arab Emirates) UAE	18 April 2006	19 October 2026	58
158	Warner Park	Basseterre	(Saint Kitts and Nevis) Saint Kitts & Nevis	23 May 2006	12 December 2024	21
159	Stormont	Belfast	(Northern Ireland) Northern Ireland	13 June 2006	15 August 2026	37
160	Cambusdoon New Ground	Ayr	(Scotland) Scotland	5 August 2006	16 July 2022	9
161	Kinrara Academy Oval	Kuala Lumpur	(Malaysia) Malaysia	12 September 2006	30 August 2018	10
162	Mombasa Sports Club Ground	Mombasa	(Kenya) Kenya	11 November 2006	20 February 2012	12
163	Sher-e-Bangla National Cricket Stadium	Mirpur	(Bangladesh) Bangladesh	8 December 2006	14 June 2026	131
164	Jaffery Sports Club Ground	Nairobi	(Kenya) Kenya	29 January 2007	5 February 2007	5
165	Ruaraka Sports Club Ground	Nairobi	(Kenya) Kenya	30 January 2007	5 February 2007	5
166	Sir Vivian Richards Stadium	St. John's	(Antigua and Barbuda) Antigua and Barbuda	27 March 2007	2 November 2024	24
167	Providence Stadium	Providence	(Guyana) Guyana	28 March 2007	16 July 2026	28
168	Titwood	Glasgow	(Scotland) Scotland	16 August 2007	17 July 2022	6
169	Hazelaarweg Stadion	Rotterdam	(Netherlands) Netherlands	18 August 2007	21 August 2024	18
170	Maple Leaf North-West Ground	King City	(Canada) Canada	28 June 2008	16 June 2026	26
171	Mannofield Park	Aberdeen	(Scotland) Scotland	1 July 2008	17 August 2022	22
172	Dubai International Cricket Stadium	Dubai	(United Arab Emirates) UAE	22 April 2009	3 November 2025	66
173	Windsor Park	Roseau	(Dominica) Dominica	26 July 2009	30 May 2010	4
174	Vidarbha Cricket Association Stadium	Nagpur	(India) India	28 October 2009	6 February 2025	10
175	University Oval	Dunedin	(New Zealand) New Zealand	8 February 2010	17 December 2023	12
176	Sportpark Westvliet	The Hague	(Netherlands) Netherlands	1 July 2010	15 August 2024	9
177	Sportpark Thurlede	Schiedam	(Netherlands) Netherlands	9 July 2010	10 July 2010	2
178	Mahinda Rajapaksa International Stadium	Hambantota	(Sri Lanka) Sri Lanka	20 February 2011	24 August 2023	26
179	Pallekele International Cricket Stadium	Pallekele	(Sri Lanka) Sri Lanka	8 March 2011	8 July 2025	45
180	Cobham Oval	Whangārei	(New Zealand) New Zealand	6 February 2012	20 December 2017	2
181	Saurashtra Cricket Association Stadium	Rajkot	(India) India	11 January 2013	14 January 2025	5
182	JSCA International Cricket Stadium	Ranchi	(India) India	19 January 2013	30 November 2025	7
183	Himachal Pradesh Cricket Association Stadium	Dharamshala	(India) India	27 January 2013	13 June 2026	10
184	ICC Global Cricket Academy	Dubai	(United Arab Emirates) UAE	11 March 2013	4 November 2026	39
185	Malahide Cricket Club Ground	Dublin	(Republic of Ireland) Ireland	3 September 2013	15 July 2022	22
186	Maharashtra Cricket Association Stadium	Pune	(India) India	13 October 2013	11 November 2023	12
187	Saxton Oval	Nelson	(New Zealand) New Zealand	4 January 2014	20 December 2023	12
188	Hagley Oval	Christchurch	(New Zealand) New Zealand	23 January 2014	16 November 2025	17
189	Bert Sutcliffe Oval	Lincoln	(New Zealand) New Zealand	23 January 2014	1 February 2014	2
190	Bay Oval	Mount Maunganui	(New Zealand) New Zealand	28 January 2014	15 November 2026	15
191	Bayuemas Oval	Pandamaran	(Malaysia) Malaysia	1 May 2014	12 September 2026	3
192	Riverway Stadium	Townsville	(Australia) Australia	8 November 2014	3 September 2022	5
193	Mission Road Ground	Mong Kok	(Hong Kong) Hong Kong	26 January 2016	28 November 2016	4
194	Greater Noida Sports Complex Ground	Greater Noida	(India) India	8 March 2017	24 March 2017	5
195	Amini Park	Port Moresby	(Papua New Guinea) Papua New Guinea	21 September 2022	7 October 2017	8
196	Perth Stadium	Perth	(Australia) Australia	28 January 2018	13 November 2026	5
197	Old Hararians	Harare	(Zimbabwe) Zimbabwe	8 March 2018	20 March 2018	5
198	Barsapara Cricket Stadium	Guwahati	(India) India	21 October 2018	30 September 2026	3
199	Greenfield International Stadium	Trivandrum	(India) India	1 November 2018	27 September 2026	3
200	Sylhet International Cricket Stadium	Sylhet	(Bangladesh) Bangladesh	14 December 2018	23 March 2023	7
201	Rajiv Gandhi International Cricket Stadium	Dehradun	(India) India	28 February 2019	10 March 2019	5
202	Wanderers Cricket Ground	Windhoek	(Namibia) Namibia	27 April 2019	15 March 2025	22
203	Affies Park	Windhoek	(Namibia) Namibia	27 April 2019	27 April 2019	1
204	Sportpark Het Schootsveld	Deventer	(Netherlands) Netherlands	19 June 2019	21 June 2019	2
205	Bready	Magheramason	(Northern Ireland) Northern Ireland	1 July 2019	7 August 2026	2
206	Central Broward Regional Park	Lauderhill	(United States) United States	13 September 2019	27 May 2025	12
207	Ekana Cricket Stadium	Lucknow	(India) India	6 November 2019	17 June 2026	10
208	Oman Cricket Academy Ground (Ministry Turf 1)	Muscat	(Oman) Oman	5 January 2020	19 October 2026	36
209	Tribhuvan University International Cricket Ground	Kirtipur	(Nepal) Nepal	5 February 2020	22 May 2026	46
210	Sportpark Maarschalkerweerd	Utrecht	(Netherlands) Netherlands	2 June 2021	31 July 2026	12
211	Oman Cricket Academy Ground (Ministry Turf 2)	Muscat	(Oman) Oman	6 September 2021	28 September 2021	5
212	West End Park International Cricket Stadium	Doha	(Qatar) Qatar	21 January 2022	25 January 2022	3
213	Moosa Stadium	Pearland	(United States) United States	28 May 2022	15 June 2022	12
214	United Ground	Windhoek	(Namibia) Namibia	1 December 2022	24 September 2024	19
215	Shaheed Veer Narayan Singh International Cricket Stadium	Raipur	(India) India	21 January 2023	3 December 2025	2
216	Mulpani Cricket Stadium	Kathmandu	(Nepal) Nepal	29 April 2023	29 April 2023	1
217	Takashinga Cricket Club	Harare	(Zimbabwe) Zimbabwe	18 June 2023	6 July 2023	9
218	Brian Lara Cricket Academy	San Fernando	(Trinidad and Tobago) Trinidad and Tobago	1 August 2023	12 August 2025	4
219	Forthill	Dundee	(Scotland) Scotland	16 July 2024	13 August 2026	16
220	Grand Prairie Stadium	Dallas	(United States) United States	25 October 2024	13 October 2026	12
221	Baroda Cricket Association Stadium	Vadodara	(India) India	11 January 2026	11 January 2026	1
222	Namibia Cricket Ground	Windhoek	(Namibia) Namibia	4 April 2026	13 September 2026	8
223	UKM-YSD Cricket Oval	Bangi	(Malaysia) Malaysia	8 September 2026	8 September 2026	1
224	Maharaja Yadavindra Singh International Cricket Stadium	New Chandigarh	(India) India	3 October 2026	3 October 2026	1
225	High Performance Oval	Windhoek	(Namibia) Namibia	22 October 2026	1 November 2026	5
226	UDST Cricket Ground	Doha	(Qatar) Qatar	22 November 2026	22 November 2026	1

Note: Nondescripts Cricket Club Ground, Colombo was scheduled to host three ODIs in May 1987 (these matches were cancelled). Molana Azad Stadium, Jammu (December 1988) and Dr DY Patil Sports Academy, Mumbai (November 2009) were also due to host international matches (both abandoned).

== Grounds by country ==
List of grounds by country up to 22 November 2026 (ODI 5067). (Note: Cricinfo groups the individual countries of the West Indies together, but these have been separated for this list. ESPNcricinfo also counts Welsh grounds under England and grounds from the Republic of Ireland and Northern Ireland together under Ireland; these have also been separated for this list.)

Country	No. of Stadiums	Location of First Match	City	Date of First Match	No. of ODIs
(Antigua and Barbuda) Antigua and Barbuda	2	Antigua Recreation Ground	St. John's	22 February 1978	35
(Australia) Australia	19	Melbourne Cricket Ground	Melbourne	5 January 1971	650
(Bangladesh) Bangladesh	8	MA Aziz Stadium	Chittagong	27 October 1988	257
(Barbados) Barbados	1	Kensington Oval	Bridgetown	23 April 1985	51
(Canada) Canada	2	Toronto Cricket, Skating and Curling Club	Toronto	16 September 1996	56
(Dominica) Dominica	1	Windsor Park	Roseau	26 July 2009	4
(England) England	20	Old Trafford Cricket Ground	Manchester	24 August 1972	483
(Grenada) Grenada	1	Queen's Park	St. George's	7 April 1983	25
(Guyana) Guyana	3	Albion Sports Complex	Albion	16 March 1977	44
(Hong Kong) Hong Kong	1	Mission Road Ground	Hong Kong	26 January 2016	4
(India) India	52	Sardar Vallabhbhai Patel Stadium	Ahmedabad	25 November 1981	541
(Republic of Ireland) Ireland	2	Clontarf Cricket Club Ground	Dublin	21 May 1999	50
(Jamaica) Jamaica	1	Sabina Park	Kingston	26 April 1984	43
(Kenya) Kenya	7	Gymkhana Club Ground	Nairobi	28 September 1996	90
(Malaysia) Malaysia	3	Kinrara Academy Oval	Kuala Lumpur	12 September 2006	14
(Morocco) Morocco	1	National Cricket Stadium	Tangier	12 August 2002	7
(Namibia) Namibia	5	Wanderers Cricket Ground	Windhoek	27 April 2019	55
(Nepal) Nepal	2	Tribhuvan University International Cricket Ground	Kirtipur	5 February 2020	47
(Netherlands) Netherlands	6	VRA Cricket Ground	Amstelveen	26 May 1999	74
(New Zealand) New Zealand	16	Lancaster Park	Christchurch	11 February 1973	378
(Northern Ireland) Northern Ireland	2	Civil Service Cricket Club Ground	Belfast	13 June 2006	39
(Oman) Oman	2	Oman Cricket Academy Ground	Muscat	5 January 2020	41
(Pakistan) Pakistan	16	Jinnah Stadium	Sialkot	16 October 1976	259
(Papua New Guinea) Papua New Guinea	1	Amini Park	Port Moresby	6 October 2017	8
(Qatar) Qatar	2	West End Park International Cricket Stadium	Doha	21 January 2022	4
(Saint Kitts and Nevis) Saint Kitts and Nevis	1	Warner Park	Basseterre	23 May 2006	21
(Saint Lucia) Saint Lucia	2	Mindoo Phillip Park	Castries	12 April 1978	32
(Saint Vincent and the Grenadines) Saint Vincent and the Grenadines	1	The Playing Fields	Kingstown	4 February 1981	23
(Scotland) Scotland	5	Grange CC Ground	Edinburgh	24 May 1999	75
(Singapore) Singapore	2	The Padang	Singapore	1 April 1996	14
(South Africa) South Africa	12	Sahara Park Newlands	Cape Town	7 December 1992	386
(Sri Lanka) Sri Lanka	9	Sinhalese Sports Club Ground	Colombo	13 February 1982	376
(Trinidad and Tobago) Trinidad and Tobago	2	Queen's Park Oval	Port of Spain	9 March 1983	76
(United Arab Emirates) UAE	4	Sharjah Cricket Stadium	Sharjah	6 April 1984	420
(United States) United States	3	Central Broward Regional Park	Lauderhill	13 September 2019	36
(Wales) Wales	2	St Helen's Rugby and Cricket Ground	Swansea	18 July 1973	34
(Zimbabwe) Zimbabwe	6	Harare Sports Club	Harare	25 October 1992	313

== See also ==
- List of Test cricket grounds
- List of Twenty20 International cricket grounds
- List of women's One Day International cricket grounds
- List of cricket grounds by capacity
