= List of hockey stadiums in Pakistan =

This is a list of field hockey stadiums in Pakistan. Only field hockey venues with a capacity of 1,000 or higher are included.

== Existing stadiums ==
Name	City	Capacity	Status of turf	Image
National Hockey Stadium	Lahore	45,000	Rehabilitation	
Abdul Sattar Edhi Hockey Stadium	Karachi	30,000	Rehabilitation	
Faisalabad Hockey Stadium	Faisalabad	25,000	Rehabilitation	
Lala Ayub Hockey Stadium	Peshawar	14,000		
Army Hockey Stadium	Rawalpindi	7,000		
Gojra Hockey Stadium	Gojra	5,000	Excellent condition	
Matiullah Hockey Stadium	Bahawalpur	5,000	Excellent condition	
Sialkot Hockey Stadium	Sialkot	5,000	Rehabilitation	
Abbottabad Hockey Stadium	Abbottabad	3,000		
Ayub Bha Hockey Stadium	Khushab	5,000	Excellent condition	
Shahnaz Sheikh Hockey Stadium	Rawalpindi	1,000	Excellent condition	

== See also ==
- List of cricket grounds in Pakistan
- List of sports venues in Karachi
- List of sports venues in Lahore
- List of sports venues in Faisalabad
- List of stadiums by capacity
- Lists of stadiums
