= List of stadiums in Pakistan =

This is a list of major sport stadiums in Pakistan. Only stadiums with the capacity of 2,000 spectators or more are included.

== Current stadiums ==
#	Image	Stadium	Capacity	City	Province	Home team(s)	Sport(s)
1		Jinnah Sports Stadium	48,700	Islamabad	Islamabad Capital Territory	Pakistan national football team	Multi-Purpose
2		National Hockey Stadium	45,000	Lahore	Punjab	Pakistan national field hockey team	Hockey
3		People's Football Stadium	40,000	Karachi	Sindh	Pakistan national football team	Football
4		Arbab Niaz Stadium	35,000	Peshawar	Khyber Pakhtunkhwa	Pakistan national cricket team, Khyber Pakhtunkhwa cricket team, Peshawar Zalmi	Cricket
5		Multan Cricket Stadium	35,000	Multan	Punjab	Multan Sultans, Multan cricket team, Multan Tigers	Cricket
6		Gaddafi Stadium	34,000	Lahore	Punjab	Lahore Qalandars, Lahore cricket teams, Pakistan International Airlines cricket team and Pakistan Cricket Team	Cricket
7		National Stadium	30,000	Karachi	Sindh	Karachi cricket team, Karachi Dolphins, Karachi Zebras, Karachi Kings, Pakistan International Airlines cricket team, Pakistan national cricket team	Cricket
8		Abdul Sattar Edhi Hockey Stadium	30,000	Karachi	Sindh	Pakistan national field hockey team	Hockey
9		Faisalabad Hockey Stadium	25,000	Faisalabad	Punjab	Pakistan national field hockey team	Hockey
10		Zahoor Elahi Stadium	25,000	Gujrat	Punjab		Cricket
11		Ayub National Stadium	20,000	Quetta	Balochistan		Multi-Purpose
12		Bugti Stadium	20,000	Quetta	Balochistan	Quetta Gladiators	Cricket
13		Jinnah Stadium	20,000	Gujranwala	Punjab	Pakistan national cricket team, Gujranwala Cricket Association	Multi-purpose
14		Sargodha Cricket Stadium	20,000	Sargodha	Punjab	Sargodha Division Cricket Association, Sargodha cricket team	Cricket
15		KPT Football Stadium	20,000	Karachi	Sindh	Karachi Port Trust	Football
16		Ibn-e-Qasim Bagh Stadium	18,000	Multan	Punjab, Pakistan		Multi-Purpose
17		Iqbal Stadium	18,000	Faisalabad	Punjab	Faisalabad cricket team, Faisalabad Wolves, Pakistan national cricket team	Cricket
18		Jinnah Stadium	18,000	Sialkot	Punjab	Sialkot cricket team, Sialkot Stallions	Cricket
19		Rawalpindi Cricket Stadium	18,000	Rawalpindi	Punjab	Rawalpindi cricket team, Rawalpindi Rams, Islamabad United and Pakistan Cricket Team	Cricket
20		Quaid-e-Azam Stadium	16,000	Mirpur	Azad Jammu and Kashmir	Jaguars	Cricket
21		Bahawal Stadium	15,000	Bahawalpur	Punjab	Pakistan national cricket team	Cricket
22		Qayyum Stadium	15,000	Peshawar	Khyber Pakhtunkhwa	Peshawar football team, Peshawar Olympic team, Peshawar badminton club	Sports complex
23		KMC Football Stadium	15,000	Karachi	Sindh		Football
24		Niaz Stadium	15,000	Hyderabad	Sindh	Hyderabad cricket team, Hyderabad Hawks	Cricket
25		Pindi Club Ground	15,000	Rawalpindi	Punjab	Pakistan national cricket team	Cricket
26		Punjab Stadium	15,000	Lahore	Punjab	Pakistan national football team	Multi-Purpose
27		Sheikhupura Stadium	15,000	Sheikhupura	Punjab	Pakistan national cricket team	Cricket
28		Marghzar Cricket Ground	15,000	Islamabad	Islamabad Capital Territory		Cricket
29		Liaquat Gymnasium	10,223	Islamabad	Islamabad Capital Territory		Sports complex
30		Gwadar Cricket Stadium	10,000	Gwadar	Balochistan		Cricket
31		Hyderabad Football Stadium	10,000	Hyderabad	Sindh, Pakistan	Hyderabad District Football Association	Football
32		Hayatabad Sports Complex	10,000	Peshawar	Khyber Pakhtunkhwa		Cricket
33		Qayyum Papa Stadium	10,000	Quetta	Balochistan		Football
34		Muzaffarabad Cricket Stadium	10,000	Muzaffarabad	Azad Jammu and Kashmir		Cricket
35		Southend Club Cricket Stadium	10,000	Karachi	Sindh		Cricket
36		Shaheed Mohtarama Benazir Bhutto International Cricket Stadium	10,000	Garhi Khuda Bakhsh	Sindh		Cricket
37		Zafar Ali Stadium	10,000	Sahiwal	Punjab		Cricket
38		Bilawal Stadium	10,000	Nawabshah	Sindh		Sports complex
39		Jinnah Municipal Stadium	10,000	Sukkur	Sindh		Sports complex
40		Zamir Jaffri Cricket Stadium	10,000	Jhelum	Punjab		Cricket
41		Shoaib Akhtar Stadium	8,000	Rawalpindi	Punjab	Khan Research Laboratories	Multi-purpose
42		Asghar Ali Shah Cricket Stadium	8,000	Karachi	Sindh		Cricket
43		Army Stadium	7,000	Rawalpindi	Punjab	Pakistan Army	Football
44		Sargodha Hockey Stadium	7,000	Sargodha	Punjab	Sargodha District Hockey Team	Hockey
45		Tehmas Khan Football Stadium	6,000	Peshawar	Khyber Pakhtunkhwa		Football
46		Railway Stadium	5,000	Lahore	Punjab	Pakistan Railways	Football
47		Sadiq Shaheed Stadium	5,000	Quetta	Balochistan	Muslim FC	Football
48		Drigh Road Union Football Stadium	5,000	Karachi	Sindh		Football
49		Sialkot Hockey Stadium	5,000	Sialkot	Punjab	Silkot District hockey team, Crescent Hockey Club	Hockey
50		Abbottabad Cricket Stadium	4,000	Abbottabad	Khyber Pakhtunkhwa		Cricket
51		Abbottabad Hockey Stadium	3,000	Abbottabad	Khyber Pakhtunkhwa		Hockey
52		Sialkot Hockey Stadium	3,000	Sialkot	Punjab		Hockey
53		Karachi Race Club	3,000	Karachi	Sindh		Horse racing
54		Railways Ground	2,000	Faisalabad	Punjab	Lyallpur	Football
55		Karachi United Stadium	2,000	Karachi	Sindh	Karachi United	Football
56		PAF Complex	2,000	Islamabad	Islamabad Capital Territory	Pakistan Air Force	Sports complex

== Future projects ==
Stadium	Capacity	City	Province	Home team	Sport(s)
Rafi Cricket Stadium	50,000	Karachi	Sindh	Pakistan national cricket team	Cricket
Islamabad Cricket Stadium	50,000	Islamabad	Islamabad Capital Territory	Pakistan national cricket team	Cricket
Sialkot Sports Complex	49,000	Sialkot	Punjab		Sports complex
Marvi Sports Complex	10,000	Tharpakar @Mithi	Sindh		Sports complex

== Defunct grounds ==
Stadium	Capacity	City	Province	Home team	Sport(s)
Montgomery Cricket Club Ground		Sahiwal	Punjab	Pakistan national cricket team	Cricket

== See also ==
- List of cricket grounds in Pakistan
- List of football stadiums in Pakistan
- List of hockey stadiums in Pakistan
- List of sports venues in Karachi
- List of sports venues in Lahore
- List of sports venues in Faisalabad
- List of stadiums by capacity
- Lists of stadiums
