= Hyderabad Football Stadium =

Multi-purpose stadium in Hyderabad, Sindh, Pakistan

Hyderabad Football Stadium is a multi-purpose stadium in Hyderabad, in Pakistan's Sindh province. It is currently used mostly for football matches. The stadium has a seating capacity of about 3,000 spectators.

== See also ==
- List of stadiums in Pakistan
- List of cricket grounds in Pakistan
- List of sports venues in Karachi
- List of sports venues in Lahore
- List of sports venues in Faisalabad
- List of stadiums by capacity
