= Faisalabad Hockey Stadium =

Multi-use stadium in Faisalabad, Pakistan

Coordinates: 31°25′3″N 73°6′56″E

- فیصل آباد ہاکی سٹیڈیم
- Interactive map of Faisalabad Hockey Stadium
- Location: Faisalabad, Pakistan
- Owner: Pakistan Hockey Federation
- Capacity: 25,000
- Surface: AstroTurf
- Scoreboard: Digital

Construction
- Opened: 16 April 2003; 23 years ago

Tenant
- Pakistan national field hockey team

The Faisalabad Hockey Stadium is a multi-use stadium in Faisalabad, in central Punjab, Pakistan. Used mainly for staging field hockey matches, it is the third-largest hockey stadium in Pakistan (after Lahore and Karachi), and can accommodate 25,000 spectators.

It is located at Susan Road, a major shopping and restaurant area in the heart of the city and was built during the 1990s. It provides good facilities to players from the proverbial nursery of hockey in Pakistan, Gojra, which is located in Faisalabad District.

The stadium has floodlights and training facilities. It is controlled by Pakistan Hockey Federation (PHF), which also looks after the management and other issues of the stadium with cooperation of provincial and local governments.

It is home ground of the Pakistan national field hockey team as well as regional teams. Many national level tournaments, such as National Hockey Championship, have been organized here.

== History ==
In 1985, the Government of Pakistan, decided to make Faisalabad a divisional headquarters and started many uplift projects in the city. The slow progress resulted in a total construction time of more than 10 years, with the construction being completed in 2002 as a part of these projects. Governor of Punjab Khalid Maqbool inaugurated the stadium on 16 April 2003. An AstroTurf surface was laid there the same year, and hasn't been replaced since in spite of its poor condition.

Faisalabad District has remained in the limelight in the history of Pakistan hockey because this district has been producing many national-level and Olympic hockey players.

== See also ==
- List of stadiums in Pakistan
- List of cricket grounds in Pakistan
- List of sports venues in Karachi
- List of sports venues in Lahore
- List of sports venues in Faisalabad
- List of stadiums by capacity
