= Lahore Rugby Football Club =

(Pakistan) Lahore RFC
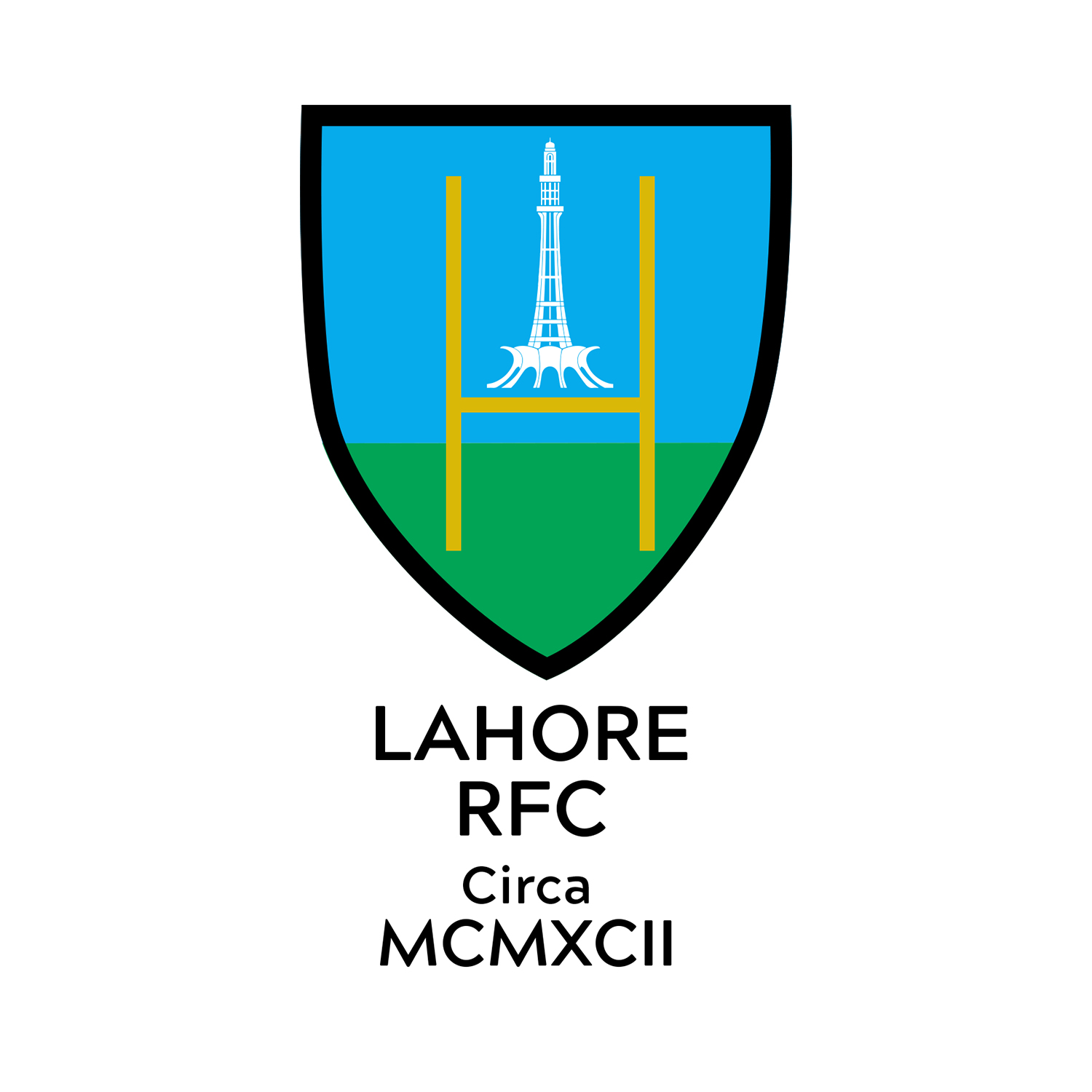
- Full name: Lahore Rugby Football Club
- Nickname(s): LRFC
- Founded: 1991
- Location: Lahore, Pakistan
- Ground(s): DHA Stadium & Rugby Academy Askari X
- President: Salman Munir
- Coach(es): Umer Usman
- Captain(s): Shoaib Javed
- League(s): Servis Tyre Rugby 15's Tournament (National Rugby Championship)
- 2018-19: Group stage
Team kit

Lahore Rugby Football Club is a Division I Pakistani rugby union club based in Lahore, Pakistan.

In 2012, it was one of three Pakistani clubs - the others being Islamabad Rugby Football Club and LUMS Rugby Football Club - to participate in the Dubai Sevens tournament in the United Arab Emirates.

== History ==
The Lahore Rugby Football Club (LRFC) was founded in the summer of 1991, and was registered in 1992. At that time, a large contingent of expatriates was present in Lahore, working for multinational companies, foreign missions and foreign aid agencies.

A similar situation also existed in Islamabad and Karachi. From the outset, all these three clubs started a regular exchange of rugby matches and an annual Pakistan Rugby Sevens event also evolved from their regular exchange of fixtures.

The presence of skilled expatriate players on the team lent support in recruiting and training of more local players. The LRFC was able to maintain a steady stream of local players as the expatriate population in Lahore waned due to the political-cum-economic scenario of the country. By 1995/96, LRFC could boast of a full contingent of local rugby players and has maintained this status ever since.

The reduction in the expatriate members in the game also reduced the team's ability to attract sponsorship. Lahore, despite this handicap, maintained an active calendar each season due to hard work and dedication of its members. The club started to expand its horizons by participating in regional tournaments in the Gulf and South Asia. LRFC became a regular participant at the prestigious Dubai 7's Rugby Tournament (1997-present) event and participated twice in Sharjah 10's (1999 & 2001). Since 1995, LRFC has also been a regular participant at the All India & South Asia Rugby 15's Tournament in India, but currently its participation is restricted due to the political tensions between Pakistan and India. The club has also traveled to India, for events other than All India Tournament, and to Sri Lanka as well.

LRFC has organised an annual rugby 10's Tournament eight times on its own (1999-2006). The club hosts teams from Sri Lanka and India in this tournament on a regular basis. The club committee planned to introduce an international invitational Rugby 7's tournament on annual basis starting in 2019.

The LRFC currently competes in the Servis Tyres Division I Rugby competition, against four other teams, including Pakistan Army, Islamabad Jinns, Lahore Hawks and Lodhran.

== Club committee ==
- Chairperson: M. Iftikhar Arshad Mallhi
- President: Salman Munir
- Senior vice-president: Usman
- Vice-president: Muneeb Ibrahim
- Secretary: Manan Naseem
- Treasurer: Shoaib Javed

== See also ==
- List of stadiums in Pakistan
- List of cricket grounds in Pakistan
- List of sports venues in Karachi
- List of sports venues in Lahore
- List of sports venues in Faisalabad
