= International cricket in 1977–78 =

International cricket season

The 1977–78 international cricket season was from September 1977 to April 1978.

== Season overview ==
International tours
Start date	Home team	Away team	Results [Matches]			
Start date	Home team	Away team	Test	ODI	FC	LA
2 December 1977	Australia	India	3–2 [5]	—	—	—
14 December 1977	Pakistan	England	0–0 [3]	1–2 [3]	—	—
10 February 1978	New Zealand	England	1–1 [3]	—	—	—
22 February 1978	West Indies	Australia	3–1 [5]	1–1 [2]	—	—

== December ==
=== India in Australia ===
Test series
No.	Date	Home captain	Away captain	Venue	Result
Test 809	2–6 December	Bob Simpson	Bishan Singh Bedi	The Gabba, Brisbane	Australia by 16 runs
Test 811	16–21 December	Bob Simpson	Bishan Singh Bedi	WACA Ground, Perth	Australia by 2 wickets
Test 812	30 Dec–4 January	Bob Simpson	Bishan Singh Bedi	Melbourne Cricket Ground, Melbourne	India by 222 runs
Test 814	7–12 January	Bob Simpson	Bishan Singh Bedi	Sydney Cricket Ground, Sydney	India by an innings and 2 runs
Test 816	28 Jan–3 February	Bob Simpson	Bishan Singh Bedi	Adelaide Oval, Adelaide	Australia by 47 runs

=== England in Pakistan ===
Test series
No.	Date	Home captain	Away captain	Venue	Result
Test 810	14–19 December	Wasim Bari	Mike Brearley	Gaddafi Stadium, Lahore	Match drawn
Test 813	2–7 January	Wasim Bari	Mike Brearley	Niaz Stadium, Hyderabad, Sindh	Match drawn
Test 815	18–23 January	Wasim Bari	Geoff Boycott	National Stadium, Karachi	Match drawn
ODI series
No.	Date	Home captain	Away captain	Venue	Result
ODI 45	23 December	Wasim Bari	Mike Brearley	Zafar Ali Stadium, Sahiwal	England by 3 wickets
ODI 46	30 December	Wasim Bari	Geoff Boycott	Jinnah Stadium, Sialkot	England by 6 wickets
ODI 47	13 January	Wasim Bari	Mike Brearley	Gaddafi Stadium, Lahore	Pakistan by 36 runs

== February ==
=== England in New Zealand ===
Test series
No.	Date	Home captain	Away captain	Venue	Result
Test 817	10–15 February	Mark Burgess	Geoff Boycott	Basin Reserve, Wellington	New Zealand by 72 runs
Test 818	24 Feb–1 March	Mark Burgess	Geoff Boycott	Lancaster Park, Christchurch	England by 174 runs
Test 820	4–10 March	Mark Burgess	Geoff Boycott	Eden Park, Auckland	Match drawn

=== Australia in the West Indies ===
Frank Worrell Trophy Test Series
No.	Date	Home captain	Away captain	Venue	Result
Test 819	3–5 March	Clive Lloyd	Bob Simpson	Queen's Park Oval, Port of Spain	West Indies by an innings and 106 runs
Test 821	17–19 March	Clive Lloyd	Bob Simpson	Kensington Oval, Bridgetown	West Indies by 9 wickets
Test 822	31 Mar-5 April	Alvin Kallicharran	Bob Simpson	Bourda, Georgetown	Australia by 3 wickets
Test 823	15–18 April	Alvin Kallicharran	Bob Simpson	Queen's Park Oval, Port of Spain	West Indies by 198 runs
Test 824	28 Apr-3 May	Alvin Kallicharran	Bob Simpson	Sabina Park, Kingston	Match drawn
ODI Series
No.	Date	Home captain	Away captain	Venue	Result
ODI 48	22 February	Deryck Murray	Bob Simpson	Antigua Recreation Ground, St. John's	West Indies by 44 runs (revised)
ODI 49	12 April	Alvin Kallicharran	Bob Simpson	Mindoo Phillip Park, Castries	Australia by 2 wickets
