= Sargodha Cricket Stadium =

Cricket stadium in Sargodha, Punjab, Pakistan

- Sargodha Stadium
- Interactive map of Sargodha Cricket Stadium

Ground information
- Location: Sargodha, Punjab, Pakistan
- Country: Pakistan
- Coordinates: 32°30′3″N 74°33′14″E
- Establishment: 1940
- Capacity: 20,000
- Owner: Pakistan Cricket Board
- Operator: Sargodha Division Cricket Association
- Tenants: Sargodha cricket team
- End names
- Pavilion End; Railway End

International information
- Only men's ODI: 11 Jan 1992: Pakistan v Sri Lanka

Team information
Sargodha cricket team	(2003 – present)
- As of 10 October 2003; Source: Cricinfo

Sargodha Cricket Stadium is a cricket stadium located in Sargodha, Punjab, Pakistan. It is primarily used for staging cricket matches. It was established in 1940 and presently has a seating capacity of 40,000. The stadium hosted its first One Day International in 1992, between Pakistan and Sri Lanka. It is located within walking distance of the University of Sargodha and is part of the Local Sports and Entertainment Precinct.

The open-air stadium is also famous for its role in the development of local cricket. In September 2017, the stadium was used by the Lahore Qalandars for their "Rising Stars" talent trials.

== Tenants ==
Sargodha Cricket Stadium is home ground of the Sargodha cricket team, a first-class cricket team that represents Sargodha Division in Punjab province in Pakistan. They competed in Pakistan's first-class tournaments between 1961–62 and 2002–03.

== Other events ==
Sargodha Cricket Stadium has also hosted other events, including a picket by PTI's Chairman, former cricketer and Prime Minister of Pakistan, Imran Khan and by some other famous leaders too, and also hosts major musical concerts. In September 2022, a PTI public gathering was held at the stadium.

== Renovation ==
In May 2017, Punjab officials announced that sports development projects worth billions of rupees were underway in Sargodha Division, explicitly including upgradation of Sargodha Cricket Stadium.

== See also ==
- Pakistan Cricket Board
- List of Test cricket grounds
- List of stadiums in Pakistan
- List of cricket grounds in Pakistan
- List of sports venues in Karachi
- List of sports venues in Lahore
- List of sports venues in Faisalabad
