= Rawalpindi Cricket Stadium =

Cricket stadium in Rawalpindi, Pakistan

- راولپنڈی کرکٹ سٹیڈیم
- RCS
- Interactive map of Rawalpindi Cricket Stadium
- Coordinates: 33°39′5″N 73°4′34″E
- Owner: Pakistan Cricket Board
- Operator: Pakistan Cricket Board
- Capacity: 15,000
- Public transit: Rawalpindi Cricket Stadium

Ground information
- Location: Rawalpindi, Punjab, Pakistan,
- Country: Pakistan
- Establishment: 1992; 34 years ago
- Tenants: Pakistan national cricket team Islamabad United; Rawalpindiz

International information
- First men's Test: 9–14 December 1993: Pakistan v Zimbabwe
- Last men's Test: 17–21 November 2026: Pakistan v Sri Lanka
- First men's ODI: 19 January 1992: Pakistan v Sri Lanka
- Last men's ODI: 22 October 2026: England v Sri Lanka
- First men's T20I: 7 November 2020: Pakistan v Zimbabwe
- Last men's T20I: 13 October 2026: Pakistan v Sri Lanka
- As of 11 October 2026; Source: Cricinfo

Rawalpindi Cricket Stadium is a cricket stadium located in Rawalpindi, Punjab province of Pakistan. It is located close to Pir Mehr Ali Shah Arid Agriculture University and Rawalpindi Arts Council and has an estimated capacity of 15,000. The first international match at the stadium was played on 19 January 1992, when Sri Lanka faced Pakistan in an ODI. The stadium hosted its first Test match in 1993, when Zimbabwe toured Pakistan.

Test cricket returned to Pakistan during the 2019 two-match Test series against Sri Lanka. The first test match was held from 11–15 December 2019 at the Rawalpindi Cricket Stadium.

== History ==
Rawalpindi Cricket Stadium was established in 1992 and replaced Pindi Club Ground as an international stadium.

It is the home ground of Rawalpindiz, Islamabad United and Northern cricket team. Before the construction of Rawalpindi Cricket Stadium, Rawalpindi Club Cricket Ground had been used as a venue for international matches, including one Test match against New Zealand that was held in March 1965.

Rawalpindi Cricket Stadium was a prime spot in the 1995–96 Cricket World Cup. With an eye on the that World Cup, Pakistan Cricket Board (PCB) unveiled a new Test venue for the second Test against Zimbabwe in Rawalpindi, becoming the country's 14th Test ground. The floodlights were added in late 2001 when the Australians were set to tour the region. The stadium is just 20 minutes from the capital Islamabad.

This stadium was the home ground and international debut ground of the world's fastest bowler Shoaib Akhtar who is nicknamed the Rawalpindi Express.

In the 2nd ODI of 2004 Samsung ODI series, while other Indian batters are getting struggling with the pace and spin attack of Pakistan, Sachin Tendulkar played a courageous knock of 141 (135) in this ground.

=== Return of international cricket ===
In April 2018, the Pakistan Cricket Board (PCB) announced that the venue, along with several others in the country, would get a makeover to get them ready for future international matches and fixtures in the Pakistan Super League.

=== Pakistan vs Sri Lanka Test match ===
In October 2019, the PCB proposed hosting the two Test matches in Pakistan, instead of the UAE, at venues in Rawalpindi and Karachi. Sri Lanka Cricket said that they were "very positive" with regards to the progress of playing Test cricket in Pakistan. In November 2019, the PCB confirmed the dates and venues for the Test series, with the first test match taking place in Rawalpindi Cricket Stadium from 11 to 15 December. It was the first test match played at this venue after 15 years and first International match after 13 years.

=== 2024–25 renovation ===
In preparation for the 2025 ICC Champions Trophy, the Pakistan Cricket Board (PCB) renovates the Rawalpindi Cricket Stadium to meet international standards. Initially budgeted at PKR 1.5 billion, costs rose to PKR 18 billion due to additional upgrades across multiple venues like Gaddafi Stadium, Lahore and National Stadium, Karachi. The refurbishment includes an upgraded main pavilion and media boxes, new seating, 350 LED floodlights, and improved hospitality boxes. Despite concerns about delays, PCB Chairman Mohsin Naqvi has assured timely completion. The stadium hosts three group-stage matches, featuring teams like Pakistan, Australia, South Africa, New Zealand, and Bangladesh.

On 8 May 2025 during the 2025 India–Pakistan strikes, a drone from India landed inside the stadium complex before the start of a Pakistan Super League Twenty20 match, prompting the Pakistan Cricket Board to transfer the games to the United Arab Emirates.

The venue hosted all the matches of 2025 Pakistan T20I Tri-Nation Series and first leg of 2026–27 Pakistan ODI Tri-Series.

== Cricket World Cup ==
This Stadium hosted three ODI matches during the 1996 Cricket World Cup.

=== 1996 Cricket World Cup ===
16 February 1996
Scorecard

South Africa; 321/2 (50 overs)	v	United Arab Emirates; 152/8 (50 overs)
Gary Kirsten 188* (159); Johanne Samarasekera 1/39 (9 overs)		Arshad Laeeq 43 (79); Brian McMillan 3/11 (8 overs)

South Africa won by 169 runs
Umpires: Steve Bucknor and V. K. Ramaswamy
Player of the match: Gary Kirsten (SA)

25 February 1996
Scorecard

South Africa; 230 (50 overs)	v	England; 152 (44.3 overs)
Gary Kirsten 38 (60); Peter Martin 3/33 (10 overs)		Graham Thorpe 46 (69); Shaun Pollock 2/16 (8 overs)

South Africa won by 78 runs
Umpires: Steve Randell and Ian Robinson
Player of the match: Jonty Rhodes (SA)

5 March 1996
Scorecard

South Africa; 328/3 (50 overs)	v	Netherlands; 168/8 (50 overs)
Andrew Hudson 161 (132); Eric Gouka 1/32 (2 overs)		Nolan Clarke 32 (46); Allan Donald 2/21 (6 overs)

South Africa won by 160 runs
Umpires: Khizer Hayat and Steve Randell
Player of the match: Andrew Hudson (SA)

== ICC Champions Trophy ==
24 February 2025
14:00 UTC+5 (D/N)
Scorecard

Bangladesh; 236/9 (50 overs)	v	New Zealand; 240/5 (46.1 overs)
Najmul Hossain Shanto 77 (110); Michael Bracewell 4/26 (10 overs)		Rachin Ravindra 112 (105); Taskin Ahmed 1/28 (7 overs)

New Zealand won by 5 wickets
Umpires: Kumar Dharmasena (SL) and Ahsan Raza (Pak)
Player of the match: Michael Bracewell (NZ)

- New Zealand won the toss and elected to field.
- Michael Bracewell (NZ) delivered his best ODI bowling figures (4/26 in 10 overs) against Bangladesh. This feat set a new record for the best bowling figures by a New Zealand spinner in Champions Trophy history, surpassing Paul Wiseman's 4/45.
- Kane Williamson (NZ) surpassed Stephen Fleming as New Zealand's highest run-scorer in ICC ODI tournaments.
- Rachin Ravindra (NZ) completed 1,000 runs in ODIs in 26 innings. He became the fifth-fastest New Zealand batter to reach this milestone in ODIs.
- Rachin Ravindra (NZ) became the first New Zealand batter to score 4 centuries in ICC ODI events.
- Glenn Phillips (NZ) completed 1,000 runs in ODIs.
- As a result of this match, India and New Zealand qualified for the semi-finals and Pakistan and Bangladesh were eliminated.

27 February 2025
14:00 UTC+5 (D/N)
Scorecard

Pakistan	v	Bangladesh

Match abandoned
Umpires: Michael Gough (Eng) and Adrian Holdstock (SA)

- No toss.
- No play was possible due to rain.

25 February 2025
14:00 UTC+5 (D/N)
Scorecard

Australia	v	South Africa

Match abandoned
Umpires: Chris Gaffaney (NZ) and Richard Kettleborough (Eng)

- No toss.
- No play was possible due to rain.

== Records ==
- First Test: Dec 9–14, 1993 – Pakistan v Zimbabwe
- First ODI: 19 Jan 1992 – Pakistan v Sri Lanka.
- First T20I: 7 Jan 2020 – Pakistan v Zimbabwe.

=== Tests ===
Record	Runs	Team/player	Opposition	Date
Highest team total	657	England	Pakistan	1 December 2022
Lowest team total	98	Sri Lanka	Pakistan	17 November 2026
Highest individual score	270	(India) Rahul Dravid	Pakistan	13 April 2004
Highest partnership	323	(Pakistan) Aamer Sohail & Inzamam-ul-Haq	(Cricket West Indies) West Indies	29 November 1997

=== One Day Internationals ===
Record	Runs	Team/player	Opposition	Date
Highest team total	430/8	Sri Lanka	England	22 October 2026
Lowest team total	104/10	Zimbabwe	Sri Lanka	29 November 1997
Highest individual score	202	(England) Harry Brook	Sri Lanka	22 October 2026
Highest partnership	204	(Pakistan) Saleem Malik & Inzamam-ul-Haq	Sri Lanka	19 November 1992

=== T20 Internationals ===
Record	Runs	Team/player	Opposition	Date
Highest team total	215/3	Pakistan	Sri Lanka	11 October 2026
Lowest team total	90	New Zealand	Pakistan	12 April 2024
Highest individual score	104	(New Zealand) Mark Chapman	Pakistan	24 April 2023
Highest partnership	121*	(New Zealand) Mark Chapman & James Neesham	Pakistan	24 April 2023

== List of five wicket hauls ==
=== Key ===
Symbol	Meaning
Date	Day the Test started or ODI was held
Inn	Innings in which five-wicket haul was taken
Overs	Number of overs bowled.
Runs	Number of runs conceded
Wkts	Number of wickets taken
Econ	Runs conceded per over
Drawn	The match was drawn.

=== Tests ===
23 five-wicket hauls have been taken in Test matches at the ground.

No.	Bowler	Date	Team	Opposing team	Inn	Overs	Runs	Wkts	Result
1	Waqar Younis	9 December 1993	Pakistan	Zimbabwe	2	19	88	5	Pakistan won
2	Heath Streak	9 December 1993	Zimbabwe	Pakistan	3	20.3	56	5	Pakistan won
3	Wasim Akram	9 December 1993	Pakistan	Zimbabwe	4	23.2	65	5	Pakistan won
4	Mushtaq Ahmed	28 November 1996	Pakistan	New Zealand	1	30	87	6	Pakistan won
5	Chris Cairns	28 November 1996	New Zealand	Pakistan	2	30.4	137	5	Pakistan won
6	Mohammad Zahid	28 November 1996	Pakistan	New Zealand	3	20	66	7	Pakistan won
7	Saqlain Mushtaq	6 October 1997	Pakistan	South Africa	2	62	129	5	Drawn
8	Courtney Walsh	29 November 1997	West Indies	Pakistan	2	43.1	143	5	Pakistan won
9	Stuart MacGill	1 October 1998	Australia	Pakistan	1	22	86	5	Australia won
10	Anrich Nortje	4 February 2021	South Africa	Pakistan	1	24.3	56	5	Pakistan won
11	Hasan Ali	4 February 2021	Pakistan	South Africa	2	15.4	54	5	Pakistan won
12	George Linde	4 February 2021	South Africa	Pakistan	3	26	64	5	Pakistan won
13	Hasan Ali	4 February 2021	Pakistan	South Africa	4	16	60	5	Pakistan won
14	Noman Ali	4 March 2022	Pakistan	Australia	2	38.1	107	6	Drawn
15	Will Jacks	1 December 2022	England	Pakistan	2	40.3	161	6	England won
16	Mehidy Hasan Miraz	30 August 2024	Bangladesh	Pakistan	1	22.1	61	5	Bangladesh won
17	Khurram Shahzad	30 August 2024	Pakistan	Bangladesh	2	21	90	6	Bangladesh won
18	Hasan Mahmud	30 August 2024	Bangladesh	Pakistan	3	10.4	43	5	Bangladesh won
19	Sajid Khan	24 October 2024	Pakistan	England	1	29.2	128	6	Pakistan won
20	Noman Ali	24 October 2024	Pakistan	England	3	18.2	42	6	Pakistan won
21	Keshav Maharaj	20 October 2025	South Africa	Pakistan	1	42.4	102	7	South Africa won
22	Asif Afridi	20 October 2025	Pakistan	South Africa	2	34.3	79	6	South Africa won
23	Simon Harmer	20 October 2025	South Africa	Pakistan	3	20	50	6	South Africa won

=== One Day Internationals ===
Seven five-wicket hauls have been taken in One Day Internationals at the ground.

No.	Bowler	Date	Team	Opposing team	Inn	Overs	Runs	Wkts	Econ	Result
1	Saqlain Mushtaq	30 October 2000	Pakistan	England	1	8	20	5	2.50	Pakistan won
2	Shaheen Afridi	30 October 2020	Pakistan	Zimbabwe	2	10	49	5	4.90	Pakistan won
3	Iftikhar Ahmed	1 November 2020	Pakistan	Zimbabwe	1	10	40	5	4.00	Pakistan won
4	Mohammad Hasnain	3 November 2020	Pakistan	Zimbabwe	1	10	26	5	2.60	Tied
5	Blessing Muzarabani	3 November 2020	Zimbabwe	Pakistan	2	10	49	5	4.90	Tied
6	Arafat Minhas	30 May 2026	Pakistan	Australia	1	10	32	5	3.20	Pakistan won
7	Arafat Minhas	20 October 2026	Pakistan	England	2	8.4	40	6	4.61	Pakistan won

== See also ==
- List of stadiums in Pakistan
- List of cricket grounds in Pakistan
- List of sports venues in Karachi
- List of sports venues in Lahore
- List of sports venues in Faisalabad
- Pakistan Cricket Board
- List of Test cricket grounds
