= Asghar Ali Shah Cricket Stadium =

Cricket ground in Karachi, Pakistan

- Interactive map of Asghar Ali Shah Cricket Stadium

Ground information
- Location: Karachi, Sindh, Pakistan
- Country: Pakistan
- Coordinates: 24°56′13″N 67°1′52″E
- Establishment: 1993
- Capacity: 8,000
- Owner: Dr. Muhammad Ali Shah (initial)
- Operator: Dr. Muhammad Ali Shah (initial)
- Tenants: Various cricket clubs
- End names
- Pavilion End; Qasba Colony End

International information
- First women's ODI: 23 March 2004: Pakistan v West Indies
- Last women's ODI: 2 April 2004: Pakistan v West Indies
- Only women's T20I: 29 October 2008: Pakistan v West Indies
- As of 4 September 2020; Source: Cricinfo

Asghar Ali Shah Stadium is a cricket ground in Karachi, Pakistan. It was constructed in the memory of Late Justice Asghar Ali Shah, a former Judge of the Sindh High Court, father of renowned orthopaedic surgeon, politician and a member of Pakistan Cricket Board Dr. Syed Mohammad Ali Shah. Dr. Shah was also the manager of this stadium.

== Ground history ==
The stadium was constructed in 1993 in order to facilitate club cricket in Karachi. It was the second cricket stadium in Pakistan (after Gaddafi Stadium) to install floodlights to conduct matches at night.

== Usage ==
The stadium has been used for many international matches of smaller levels such as Under 17 Asia Cricket Cup, Under 19 Cricket Tournaments and also women's cricket tournaments. Mostly, this stadium hosts first class and domestic cricket matches. Dr.M.A.Shah Night Twenty20 Trophy is also held here every year in the month of Ramadan in which cricket teams representing cricket clubs from around the country play each other.

== See also ==
- List of stadiums in Pakistan
- List of cricket grounds in Pakistan
- List of sports venues in Karachi
- List of sports venues in Lahore
- List of sports venues in Faisalabad
- Karachi
- Dr. Muhammad Ali Shah
- Cricket
