= Nishtar Park Sports Complex =

Sport complex in Lahore, Pakistan

- مجتمع ورزشی پارک نشتار
- Location: Lahore, Pakistan
- Owner: Government of Punjab
- Operator: Sports Board Punjab

The Nishtar Park Sports Complex is a multi-sport complex in Lahore, Punjab, Pakistan, administered principally by the Government of Punjab through Sports Board Punjab. The sports complex include Punjab Stadium, National Hockey Stadium, the Punjab International Swimming Complex, an indoor gymnasium, a tennis stadium, and boxing and squash facilities.

== Development ==
The venues at Nishtar Park regularly host provincial and national multi-sport competitions. It will also host international events such as 2027 South Asian Games.

Construction of the swimming complex and tennis stadium experienced repeated delays before the facilities became operational in the 2010s.

Further development in the 2020s included construction of a squash complex, rehabilitation of the boxing complex and Punjab Stadium, and plans for a hotel for visiting athletes.

Sources frequently describe Gaddafi Stadium as forming part of the wider Nishtar Park sports precinct. The cricket ground, however, is administered by the Pakistan Cricket Board, rather than Sports Board Punjab.

== Facilities ==
Major facilities within the complex include:

- Punjab Stadium, a multi-purpose outdoor stadium
- National Hockey Stadium, a purpose-built field hockey venue
- Punjab International Swimming Complex
- Punjab International Tennis Stadium
- Nishtar Park gymnasium, used for indoor sports
- boxing complex
- squash complex

== See also ==
- List of stadiums in Pakistan
