= Pindi Club Ground =

Stadium in Rawalpindi, Pakistan

- Army Sports Ground
- Interactive map of Pindi Club Ground

Ground information
- Location: Rawalpindi, Pakistan
- Country: Pakistan
- Coordinates: 33°35′29″N 73°03′08″E
- Capacity: 15,000
- Owner: Pakistan Cricket Board
- Tenants: Pakistan national cricket team
- End names
- Near End; Pavilion End

International information
- Only men's Test: 27 March 1965: Pakistan v New Zealand
- First men's ODI: 4 December 1985: Pakistan v West Indies
- Last men's ODI: 12 October 1987: Pakistan v England
- As of 29 December 2020; Source: ESPNcricinfo

Pindi Club Ground, also known as the Army Sports Ground, is a multi-use stadium in Rawalpindi, Pakistan. It is used mostly for cricket matches. The stadium can accommodate 15,000 people and hosted its first and only international Test match in 1965. It also hosted one match as part of the 1987 Cricket World Cup.

It was the only cricket ground in Rawalpindi capable of hosting international matches until the establishment of Rawalpindi Cricket Stadium in 1992.

== History ==
The first ever double century here was scored in 1893 by the grandson of Queen Victoria, Prince Christian Victor, who was then posted in the army at Rawalpindi. He scored 205 runs against Devonshire Regiment while playing for King's Royal Rifles. The ground also hosted the Marylebone Cricket Club for two matches, one against the Europeans and the other versus Rawalpindi Sports Club, in November 1926.

The first foreign side to visit the ground after Pakistan's independence in 1947 was Ceylon (now Sri Lanka), which faced Commander-in-Chief XI in March 1950. Further national team tours followed soon afterwards.

India's first tour of Pakistan in 1955, which was the first Test series to have been played in Pakistan, also involved a tour match against a Combined Services team in February 1955. Further international tours to Pakistan often involved a three-day practice matches against local teams, which were hosted by the Pindi Club Ground.

=== Test match ===
Pindi Club Ground has hosted just one Test match, which was against New Zealand in March 1965, which Pakistan won convincingly by a margin of an innings and 64 runs. Interestingly, although Pakistan scored 318 runs in their only innings, there was not a single century scored. Neither was there any five wicket haul, although left arm spinner Pervez Sajjad took four wickets in each innings. Ehsan Mani, former ICC President and Pakistan Cricket Board Chairman, served as one of the scorers of that match.

=== One Day Internationals ===
The ground has hosted two ODIs, against the West Indies and England in 1985 and 1987 respectively. The latter match was played as a part of 1987 Cricket World Cup, and was completed on the reserve day after rain had stopped play on the original date. The Pakistan team won both matches. The highest ODI score by any batsman on this ground is the unbeaten 92 by Sir Richie Richardson.

== Current use ==
The ground is now used for cricket matches, especially by local clubs and domestic teams.

== See also ==
- List of Test cricket grounds
- List of stadiums in Pakistan
- List of cricket grounds in Pakistan
- List of sports venues in Karachi
- List of sports venues in Lahore
- List of sports venues in Faisalabad
- One-Test wonder
