= Multan Cricket Stadium =

Cricket stadium in Multan, Pakistan

- MCS
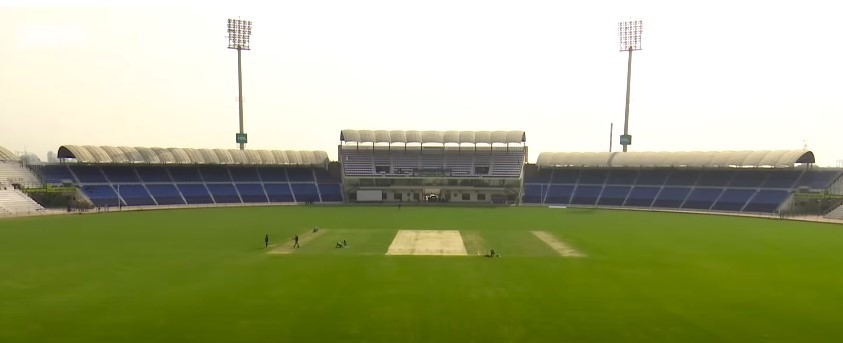
- Interior view of the stadium
- Interactive map of Multan Cricket Stadium

Ground information
- Location: Multan, Punjab, Pakistan,
- Country: Pakistan
- Coordinates: 30°10′15″N 71°31′29″E
- Establishment: 2001; 25 years ago
- Capacity: 30,000
- Owner: Pakistan Cricket Board
- Operator: Pakistan Cricket Board
- Tenants: Pakistan national cricket team Multan Sultans; Multan cricket team

International information
- First men's Test: 29–31 August 2001: Pakistan v Bangladesh
- Last men's Test: 17–19 January 2025: Pakistan v West Indies
- First men's ODI: 9 September 2003: Pakistan v Bangladesh
- Last men's ODI: 30 August 2023: Pakistan v Nepal
- First women's T20I: 16 September 2024: Pakistan v South Africa
- Last women's T20I: 20 September 2024: Pakistan v South Africa
- As of 15 October 2024; Source: Multan Cricket Stadium, Cricinfo

The Multan Cricket Stadium is a multi-purpose stadium in Multan, Punjab, owned by the Pakistan Cricket Board. The stadium is located off Vehari Road, in the suburbs of Multan. The stadium is home of Pakistan Super League team Multan Sultans. It can host 30,000 spectators. The stadium hosted its first Test match in August 2001, when Pakistan faced Bangladesh in the 2001–02 Asian Test Championship.

The stadium is also able to hold day-night matches with a set of floodlights installed at the venue.

== History ==
The ground was inaugurated in 2001 as a replacement for the Ibn-e-Qasim Bagh Stadium located at that time in the center of Multan. The first Test match at the stadium took place in August 2001 between Pakistan and Bangladesh, while the first One Day International was held on 9 September 2003 between the same teams. Floodlights were later installed to make day/night cricket matches possible. The first day/night game played here was between arch-rivals India and Pakistan on 16 February 2006.

=== Return of international cricket ===
In April 2018, the Pakistan Cricket Board (PCB) announced that the venue, along with several others in the country, would get a makeover to get them ready for future international matches and fixtures in the Pakistan Super League.

This stadium hosted its first Pakistan Super League match on 26 February 2020 between Multan Sultans and Peshawar Zalmi. This stadium hosted three matches during the 2020 Pakistan Super League. It is the home ground of Mohammad Rizwan-led Multan Sultans.

On 30 May 2022, the PCB announced that Multan Cricket Stadium would host a three match ODI series against the West Indies in June. Multan hosted its first international match in 14 years, with the first ODI against the West Indies on 8 June 2022.

In August 2022, the PCB announced that Multan would serve as one of the venues for the home Test series against England in December 2022.

In 2023 edition of Pakistan Super League Multan hosted 5 matches including opening match between Lahore and Multan.

The 2023 Asia Cup kicked off on 30 August in Multan with a grand opening ceremony featuring Nepali singer Trishala Gurung and Pakistani singer Aima Baig. Marking Pakistan's first hosting in 15 years, the inaugural match saw Pakistan face off against Nepal, setting an exciting tone for Asia's biggest cricket event.

== Enclosures ==
- Imran Khan Enclosure
- Javed Miandad Enclosure
- Zaheer Abbas Enclosure
- Waqar Younis Enclosure
- Inzamam-ul-Haq Enclosure
- Fazal Mahmood Enclosure

== Records ==
=== Test ===
- Highest team total: 823/7d, by England against Pakistan in October 2024.
- Lowest team total: 134, by Bangladesh against Pakistan in August 2001.
- Highest run chase achieved: 262/9, Pakistan against Bangladesh in September 2001.
- Highest score: 317, by (England) Harry Brook against Pakistan in October 2024.
- Most runs: 517, in 7 innings by (Pakistan) Mohammad Yousuf from 2001–2006.
- Highest partnership: 454, for the 4th wicket by (England) Harry Brook and (England) Joe Root against Pakistan in October 2024.
- Best bowling: 8/46, by (Pakistan) Noman Ali against England in October 2024.
- Most wickets: 22, in 5 innings by (Pakistan) Danish Kaneria from 2001–2006.

=== One Day International ===
- Highest team total: 342/6, by Pakistan against Nepal in August 2023.
- Lowest team total: 104, by Nepal against Pakistan in August 2023.
- Highest run chase achieved: 306/5, Pakistan against (Cricket West Indies) West Indies in June 2022.
- Highest score: 151, by (Pakistan) Babar Azam against Nepal in August 2023.
- Most runs: 332, in 4 innings by (Pakistan) Babar Azam from 2022 - 2023.
- Highest partnership: 214, for the 5th wicket by (Pakistan) Babar Azam and (Pakistan) Iftikhar Ahmed against Nepal in August 2023.
- Best bowling: 4/19, by (Pakistan) Mohammad Nawaz against (Cricket West Indies) West Indies in June 2022.
- Most wickets: 11, in 4 innings by (Pakistan) Shadab Khan from 2022 - 2023.

== See also ==
- Pakistan Cricket Board
- List of Test cricket grounds
- List of stadiums in Pakistan
- List of cricket grounds in Pakistan
- List of sports venues in Karachi
- List of sports venues in Lahore
- List of sports venues in Faisalabad
- Imran Khan
- Wasim Akram
