= Sialkot Sports Complex =

Multi-purpose sports complex in Sialkot, Pakistan

The Sialkot Sports Complex is a multi-purpose sports facility under development in Sialkot, Punjab, Pakistan. It is located on the Sialkot–Daska Road at Kotli Mir Ali. The project was initiated in 2004 after 10 acres of land were donated by hockey commentator Zakir Husain Syed for the construction of an international-standard sports complex.

Although the project experienced delays, construction continued in phases. As of 2021, work focused on developing a tartan athletics track and supporting infrastructure. On 13 August 2024, the Pakistan Army inaugurated a modern AstroTurf hockey stadium and an adjacent football ground within the complex to promote youth sports and athlete development.

== Overview ==
The complex occupies approximately 10 acres at Kotli Mir Ali on the Sialkot–Daska Road, about 5 km southeast of Sialkot city. It was conceived as a multi-purpose venue to promote athletics, field hockey, football, and other sports while improving sports infrastructure in the district.

The project is supported by the Pakistan Army, the Sialkot Chamber of Commerce and Industry, and local authorities. It aims to provide training facilities for athletes and encourage youth participation in sports. The complex also complements Sialkot's internationally recognised sports goods manufacturing industry, for which the city is well known.

== History ==
Planning for the sports complex began in the early 2000s. Construction started in 2004 following the land donation by Zakir Husain Syed. The first phase was estimated to cost approximately Rs. 40 million and included an athletics track and gymnasium.

Despite delays caused by funding and administrative challenges, development continued over the following years. In August 2024, the Pakistan Army completed and inaugurated the AstroTurf hockey stadium and adjacent football ground, marking the first major operational facilities within the complex.

== Facilities ==
The sports complex currently includes or plans to include:

- AstroTurf hockey stadium
- Football ground
- International-standard tartan athletics track
- Squash courts
- Volleyball courts
- Basketball courts
- Gymnasium
- Spectator seating and support facilities

== Events and significance ==
The AstroTurf hockey stadium hosted its inaugural hockey match on 13 August 2024. The event was attended by representatives of the Sialkot Chamber of Commerce and Industry, who reaffirmed their support for sports development in the region.

The complex is intended to strengthen sports infrastructure in Sialkot, promote youth participation in athletics and team sports, and support the city's sporting culture. It also complements Sialkot's globally recognised sports goods manufacturing industry and is expected to host district and regional sporting events in the future.

== See also ==
- Sialkot Hockey Stadium
- Jinnah Stadium, Sialkot
