= List of rugby clubs in Pakistan =

This is a list of rugby union teams that competed in the 6th Servis Tyres 15s Rugby Championship in Pakistan during the 2018-19 season.

Club rugby competitions in Pakistan have included teams representing cities, districts, institutions and the armed forces.

Division I

- Pakistan Army Rugby Football Club
- Islamabad Jinns Rugby Football Club
- Lahore Rugby Football Club
- Lahore Hawks Rugby Football Club

Division II

- Lodhran Spartans Rugby Football Club
- Desert Camels Bahawalnagar
- Multan
- Police

Division III

- Shaheen Rugby Football Club
- Dunya Pur
- Vehari
- Kot Addu

Division IV

- FATA
- Khyber Pakhtunkhwa
- Quetta
- Karachi.
