= National Hockey Stadium, Lahore =

Field hockey stadium in Lahore, Pakistan

Coordinates: 31°30′40″N 74°20′6″E

National Hockey Stadium
- اسٹیڈیم قومی ہاکی
- Interactive map of National Hockey Stadium
- Address: Nishtar Park Sports Complex, Hafeez Kardar Road, Gulberg III
- Location: Lahore, Pakistan
- Operator: Sports Board Punjab
- Capacity: 45,000
- Surface: AstroTurf

Tenant
- Pakistan national field hockey team

National Hockey Stadium is a purpose-built field hockey stadium in Lahore, Pakistan. Located inside the Nishtar Park Sports Complex, it is the largest terrace field hockey stadium in the world, having a capacity of 45,000 spectators. The stadium is part of the Nishtar Park Sports Complex which houses several facilities for all other major sports and includes the Punjab Stadium.

The offices of Sports Board Punjab and Pakistan Hockey Federation are also located in the stadium compound.

== Tournaments hosted ==
It hosted all matches of the 1990 Men's Hockey World Cup, where the hosts were defeated 3–1 by the Netherlands in the final. It has hosted many international matches and competitions, including the inaugural edition of the Champions Trophy tournament in 1978, and further editions in 1988, 1994, 1998 and 2004.

In January 2018, it hosted a two-match series between World XI and Pakistan. The stadium was the venue for Haier Hockey Series Open in December 2018.

== Political events hosted ==
Chairman Pakistan Tehreek-e-Insaf, and a former prime minister of Pakistan Imran Khan, announced his party's Haqeeqi Azadi jalsa or public meeting would be held at National Hockey Stadium on August 13, 2022.

== See also ==
- List of stadiums by capacity
- List of stadiums in Pakistan
- List of cricket grounds in Pakistan
- List of hockey stadiums in Pakistan
- List of sports venues in Karachi
- List of sports venues in Lahore
- List of sports venues in Faisalabad
- Lists of stadiums
