= Niaz Stadium =

Cricket ground in Hyderabad, Pakistan

Niaz Stadium نیاز اسٹیڈیم
- NSH
- Interactive map of Niaz Stadium نیاز اسٹیڈیم

Ground information
- Location: Hyderabad, Sindh, Sindh, Pakistan
- Country: Pakistan
- Coordinates: 25.3826°N 68.3381°E
- Establishment: 1959; 67 years ago
- Capacity: 15,000
- Owner: Hyderabad Municipal Corporation
- Operator: Hyderabad Municipal Corporation
- Tenants: Pakistan national cricket team Hyderabad Kingsmen; Hyderabad cricket team Hyderabad Hawks
- End names
- Pavilion End

International information
- First men's Test: 16 – 21 March 1973: Pakistan v England
- Last men's Test: 25 – 29 November 1984: Pakistan v New Zealand
- First men's ODI: 20 September 1982: Pakistan v Australia
- Last men's ODI: 24 January 2008: Pakistan v Zimbabwe
- As of 4 September 2020; Source: Niaz Stadium, ESPNcricinfo

Niaz Stadium is a cricket ground in Hyderabad, Pakistan. The ground can accommodate 15,000 spectators, and hosted its first Test match in 1973. It was established in November 1961 by the then Commissioner of Hyderabad, Niaz Ahmed, after whom the stadium is named.

The first ever hat-trick in One Day Internationals was claimed at this ground by Pakistan's Jalal-ud-Din during Australia's 1982–83 tour of Pakistan. Jalal-ud-Din removed Rod Marsh, Bruce Yardley, and Geoff Lawson with the last three balls of his seventh over.

Niaz Stadium celebrated staging Test cricket's 1,000th match. Pakistan has never lost a single match, whether a Test or ODI, at this ground.

== History ==
Niaz Stadium is situated in the heart of Hyderabad, one of the most populous cities in Pakistan. The stadium has been named after Niaz Ahmed, the late commissioner of Hyderabad, who was the motivating factor for building this stadium.

The inaugural first-class match was played at Niaz Stadium between South Zone and the Pakistan Education Board (PEB) on March 16–18, 1962. Niaz Stadium became the 32nd first-class ground in Pakistan and the 2nd in Hyderabad.

Only five Tests have so far been played at Hyderabad: two each against England and New Zealand, and one against India.

The inaugural Test match at the ground took place from March 16 to 21, 1973, against England, and it resulted in a draw after big scoring. England picked up 487, with Dennis Amiss scoring 158. Pakistan, in reply, did even better, compiling 569 before declaring after nine wickets had fallen. Mushtaq Mohammad hit 157 and Intikhab Alam 138. England played out time by hitting 218 for six wickets for the match to end in a draw.

The last Test played at Niaz Stadium was between Pakistan and New Zealand on November 25–29, 1984. Niaz Stadium celebrated staging Test cricket's 1000th match.

With Pakistan winning the rubber with more than a day to spare, Javed Miandad became the second Pakistani after Hanif Mohammad to score a century in each innings of a Test. Niaz Stadium boasts of the fact that Pakistan never lost a Test or one-day international here.

After a ten-year hiatus, an international match was played at the ground on January 24, 2008, between Pakistan and Zimbabwe. In April 2018, the Pakistan Cricket Board (PCB) announced that the venue, along with several others in the country, would get a makeover to get them ready for future international matches and fixtures in the Pakistan Super League. However, no PSL match could be hosted over the next few years.

In May 2025, the PCB chairman, Mohsin Naqvi announced that the stadium will be upgraded to international standards. International cricket is expected to return by 2026.

In October 2026, the Pakistan Cricket Board assumed control of the stadium for the next 20 years after reaching an agreement with the Hyderabad Municipal Corporation.

== Records and statistics ==
=== Test ===
- Highest team total: 581/3d, by Pakistan against India on 14 January 1983.
- Lowest team total: 189, by India against Pakistan on 14 January 1983.
- Highest individual score: 280*, Javed Miandad for Pakistan against India on 14 January 1983.
- Highest partnership: 451, for the 3rd wicket by Mudassar Nazar and Javed Miandad for Pakistan against India on 14 January 1983.
- Most wickets: 16 wickets, in 3 matches by Abdul Qadir.
- Most runs: 661 runs, in 4 matches by Javed Miandad.

=== One Day International ===
- Highest team total: 267/6, by Pakistan against Sri Lanka on 8 October 1987.
- Lowest team total: 127, by Sri Lanka against Pakistan on 3 November 1985.
- Highest individual score: 115*, by Javed Miandad for Pakistan against Sri Lanka on 15 January 1992.
- Highest partnership: 137, for the 3rd wicket by Hamilton Masakadza and Tatenda Taibu for Zimbabwe against Pakistan on 24 January 2008.
- Most runs: 335 runs, in 5 matches by Javed Miandad.
- Most wickets: 7 wickets, in 2 matches by Aaqib Javed.

=== Key ===
Symbol	Meaning
Date	Day the Test started or ODI was held
Inn	Innings in which five-wicket haul was taken
Overs	Number of overs bowled.
Runs	Number of runs conceded
Wkts	Number of wickets taken
Econ	Runs conceded per over
Batsmen	Batsmen whose wickets were taken
Drawn	The match was drawn.

=== Tests ===
Two five wicket hauls have been taken at Niaz Stadium:

No.	Bowler	Date	Team	Opposing team	Inn	Overs	Runs	Wkts	Econ	Result
1	Pat Pocock	16 March 1973	England	Pakistan	2	52	169	5	3.25	Drawn
2	Abdul Qadir	2 January 1978	Pakistan	England	2	24	44	6	1.37	Drawn

== See also ==
- List of Test cricket grounds
- List of stadiums in Pakistan
- List of cricket grounds in Pakistan
- List of sports venues in Karachi
- List of sports venues in Lahore
- List of sports venues in Faisalabad
