= National Hockey Stadium =

National Hockey Stadium may mean

- The National Hockey Stadium, Milton Keynes, a former national hockey stadium in England
- The National Hockey Stadium, Lahore, in Lahore, Pakistan
- The Malaysia National Hockey Stadium, in Kuala Lumpur, Malaysia
- The Ireland National Hockey Stadium at University College Dublin, Ireland
