= List of Test cricket grounds =

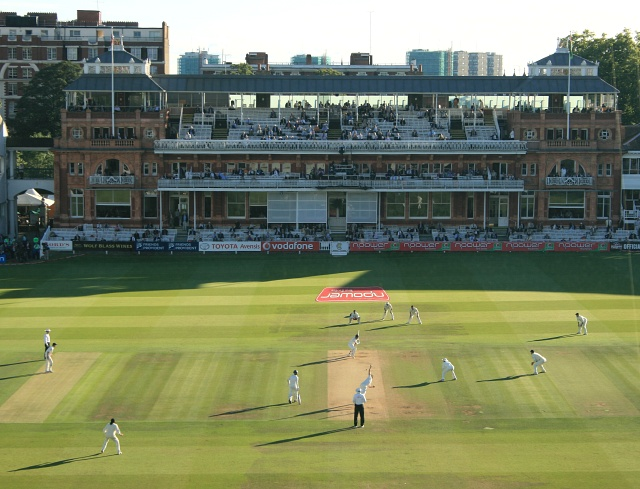
Lord's in London has hosted more men's Test matches than any other cricket ground.

One hundred and twenty-seven grounds have hosted men's Test cricket since the first officially recognised Test match between Australia and England in Melbourne in March 1877. The grounds are listed in the order in which they were first used as a venue for a men's Test cricket match. The list excludes World Series Cricket venues and women's Test venues.

On 8 July 2009, Sophia Gardens in Cardiff became the 100th Test venue. Great Barrier Reef Arena in Mackay became the 127th and most recent Test venue when it staged the second Test match between Australia and Bangladesh in August 2026.

== List of men's Test cricket grounds ==
Last updated on 19 November 2026 (Test 2647):

Inactive Test Grounds

No.	Stadium	City	Country	First match	Last match	No. of Tests
1	Melbourne Cricket Ground	Melbourne	(Australia) Australia	15 March 1877	26 December 2025	118
2	The Oval	London	(England) England	6 September 1880	17 June 2026	109
3	Sydney Cricket Ground	Sydney	(Australia) Australia	17 February 1882	4 January 2026	113
4	Old Trafford Cricket Ground	Manchester	(England) England	10 July 1884	23 July 2025	86
5	Lord's	London	(England) England	21 July 1884	26 August 2026	151
6	Adelaide Oval	Adelaide	(Australia) Australia	12 December 1884	17 December 2025	84
7	St George's Park	Gqeberha	(South Africa) South Africa	12 March 1889	18 October 2026	34
8	Newlands Cricket Ground	Cape Town	(South Africa) South Africa	25 March 1889	27 October 2026	62
9	Old Wanderers	Johannesburg	(South Africa) South Africa	2 March 1896^{1}	18 February 1939	22
10	Trent Bridge	Nottingham	(England) England	1 June 1899	25 June 2026	68
11	Headingley Cricket Ground	Leeds	(England) England	29 June 1899	19 August 2026	83
12	Edgbaston Cricket Ground	Birmingham	(England) England	29 May 1902	9 September 2026	58
13	Bramall Lane	Sheffield	(England) England	3 July 1902^{2}	3 July 1902	1
14	Lord's No. 1 Ground	Durban	(South Africa) South Africa	21 January 1910^{3}	5 November 1921	4
15	Kingsmead Cricket Ground	Durban	(South Africa) South Africa	18 January 1923	9 October 2026	47
16	Brisbane Exhibition Ground	Brisbane	(Australia) Australia	30 November 1928^{4}	16 January 1931	2
17	Lancaster Park	Christchurch	(New Zealand) New Zealand	10 January 1930	7 December 2006	40
18	Kensington Oval	Bridgetown	(Barbados) Barbados	11 January 1930	25 June 2025	56
19	Basin Reserve	Wellington	(New Zealand) New Zealand	24 January 1930	19 November 2026	71
20	Queen's Park Oval	Port of Spain	(Trinidad and Tobago) Trinidad and Tobago	1 February 1930	2 August 2026	64
21	Eden Park	Auckland	(New Zealand) New Zealand	14 February 1930	22 March 2018	50
22	Bourda	Georgetown	(Guyana) Guyana	21 February 1930	31 March 2005	30
23	Sabina Park	Kingston	(Jamaica) Jamaica	3 April 1930	12 July 2025	56
24	The Gabba	Brisbane	(Australia) Australia	27 November 1931	4 December 2025	68
25	Bombay Gymkhana Ground	Mumbai	(India) India	15 December 1933	15 December 1933	1
26	Eden Gardens	Kolkata	(India) India	5 January 1934	14 November 2025	43
27	M. A. Chidambaram Stadium	Chennai	(India) India	10 February 1934	19 September 2024	35
28	Arun Jaitley Stadium	New Delhi	(India) India	10 November 1948	10 October 2025	36
29	Brabourne Stadium	Mumbai	(India) India	9 December 1948	2 December 2009	18
30	Ellis Park Stadium	Johannesburg	(South Africa) South Africa	27 December 1948^{5}	29 January 1954	6
31	Green Park Stadium	Kanpur	(India) India	12 January 1952	27 September 2024	24
32	University Ground	Lucknow	(India) India	23 October 1952	23 October 1952	1
33	Bangabandhu National Stadium	Dhaka	(Bangladesh) Bangladesh	1 January 1955^{6}	14 January 2005	17
34	Bahawal Stadium	Bahawalpur	(Pakistan) Pakistan	15 January 1955	15 January 1955	1
35	Bagh-e-Jinnah	Lahore	(Pakistan) Pakistan	29 January 1955	26 March 1959	3
36	Peshawar Club Ground	Peshawar	(Pakistan) Pakistan	13 February 1955	13 February 1955	1
37	National Stadium	Karachi	(Pakistan) Pakistan	26 February 1955	2 January 2023	47
38	Carisbrook	Dunedin	(New Zealand) New Zealand	11 March 1955	7 March 1997	10
39	Lal Bahadur Shastri Stadium	Hyderabad	(India) India	19 November 1955	2 December 1988	3
40	Jawaharlal Nehru Stadium	Chennai	(India) India	6 January 1956	27 February 1965	9
41	New Wanderers Stadium	Johannesburg	(South Africa) South Africa	24 December 1956	15 November 2026	45
42	Gaddafi Stadium	Lahore	(Pakistan) Pakistan	21 November 1959	12 October 2025	42
43	Pindi Club Ground	Rawalpindi	(Pakistan) Pakistan	27 March 1965	27 March 1965	1
44	Vidarbha Cricket Association Ground	Nagpur	(India) India	3 October 1969	1 March 2006	9
45	WACA Ground	Perth	(Australia) Australia	11 December 1970	14 December 2017	44
46	Niaz Stadium	Hyderabad	(Pakistan) Pakistan	16 March 1973	25 November 1984	5
47	M. Chinnaswamy Stadium	Bangalore	(India) India	22 November 1974	16 October 2024	25
48	Wankhede Stadium	Mumbai	(India) India	23 January 1975	1 November 2024	27
49	Iqbal Stadium	Faisalabad	(Pakistan) Pakistan	16 November 1978	21 January 2006	24
50	McLean Park	Napier	(New Zealand) New Zealand	16 February 1979	26 January 2012	10
51	Ibn-e-Qasim Bagh Stadium	Multan	(Pakistan) Pakistan	30 December 1980	30 December 1980	1
52	Antigua Recreation Ground	St. John's	(Antigua and Barbuda) Antigua and Barbuda	27 March 1981	15 February 2009	22
53	Paikiasothy Saravanamuttu Stadium	Colombo	(Sri Lanka) Sri Lanka	17 February 1982	22 August 2019	22
54	Asgiriya Stadium	Kandy	(Sri Lanka) Sri Lanka	22 April 1983	1 December 2007	21
55	Gandhi Stadium	Jalandhar	(India) India	24 September 1983	24 September 1983	1
56	Narendra Modi Stadium	Ahmedabad	(India) India	12 November 1983	2 October 2025	16
57	Singhalese Sports Club Cricket Ground	Colombo	(Sri Lanka) Sri Lanka	16 March 1984	23 August 2026	47
58	Colombo Cricket Club Ground	Colombo	(Sri Lanka) Sri Lanka	24 March 1984	16 April 1987	3
59	Jinnah Stadium	Sialkot	(Pakistan) Pakistan	27 October 1985	22 September 1995	4
60	Barabati Stadium	Cuttack	(India) India	4 January 1987	8 November 1995	2
61	Sawai Mansingh Stadium	Jaipur	(India) India	21 February 1987	21 February 1987	1
62	Bellerive Oval	Hobart	(Australia) Australia	16 December 1989	14 January 2022	14
63	Sector 16 Stadium	Chandigarh	(India) India	23 November 1990	23 November 1990	1
64	Seddon Park	Hamilton	(New Zealand) New Zealand	22 February 1991	14 December 2024	29
65	Jinnah Stadium	Gujranwala	(Pakistan) Pakistan	20 December 1991	20 December 1991	1
66	R. Premadasa Stadium	Colombo	(Sri Lanka) Sri Lanka	28 August 1992	14 July 2017	9
67	De Soysa Stadium	Moratuwa	(Sri Lanka) Sri Lanka	8 September 1992	8 December 1993	4
68	Harare Sports Club Ground	Harare	(Zimbabwe) Zimbabwe	18 October 1992	28 June 2026	41
69	Bulawayo Athletic Club Ground	Bulawayo	(Zimbabwe) Zimbabwe	1 November 1992^{7}	1 November 1992	1
70	Southend Club Cricket Stadium	Karachi	(Pakistan) Pakistan	1 December 1993	1 December 1993	1
71	Rawalpindi Cricket Stadium	Rawalpindi	(Pakistan) Pakistan	9 December 1993	17 November 2026	19
72	K. D. Singh Babu Stadium	Lucknow	(India) India	18 January 1994	18 January 1994	1
73	Queens Sports Club Ground	Bulawayo	(Zimbabwe) Zimbabwe	20 October 1994	7 August 2025	32
74	Inderjit Singh Bindra Stadium	Mohali	(India) India	10 December 1994	4 March 2022	14
75	Arbab Niaz Stadium	Peshawar	(Pakistan) Pakistan	8 September 1995	27 August 2003	6
76	Centurion Park	Centurion	(South Africa) South Africa	16 November 1995	26 December 2024	30
77	Sheikhupura Stadium	Sheikhupura	(Pakistan) Pakistan	17 October 1996	17 October 1997	2
78	Arnos Vale Stadium	Kingstown	(Saint Vincent and the Grenadines) Saint Vincent and the Grenadines	20 June 1997	5 September 2014	3
79	Galle International Stadium	Galle	(Sri Lanka) Sri Lanka	3 June 1998	15 August 2026	50
80	Mangaung Oval	Bloemfontein	(South Africa) South Africa	29 October 1999	6 October 2017	5
81	Multan Cricket Stadium	Multan	(Pakistan) Pakistan	29 August 2001	25 January 2025	10
82	M. A. Aziz Stadium	Chittagong	(Bangladesh) Bangladesh	15 November 2001	6 January 2005	8
83	Sharjah Cricket Stadium	Sharjah	(United Arab Emirates) United Arab Emirates	31 January 2002	13 November 2016	11
84	National Cricket Stadium	St. George's	(Grenada) Grenada	28 June 2002	3 July 2025	5
85	Buffalo Park	East London	(South Africa) South Africa	18 October 2002	18 October 2002	1
86	Senwes Park	Potchefstroom	(South Africa) South Africa	25 October 2002	28 September 2017	2
87	Riverside Ground	Chester-le-Street	(England) England	5 June 2003	27 May 2016	6
88	Darren Sammy Cricket Ground	Rodney Bay	(Saint Lucia) Saint Lucia	20 June 2003	24 June 2022	10
89	Marrara Stadium	Darwin	(Australia) Australia	18 July 2003	13 August 2026	3
90	Cazalys Stadium	Cairns	(Australia) Australia	25 July 2003	9 July 2004	2
91	Zohur Ahmed Chowdhury Stadium	Chittagong	(Bangladesh) Bangladesh	28 February 2006	28 April 2025	26
92	Shaheed Chandu Stadium	Bogra	(Bangladesh) Bangladesh	8 March 2006	8 March 2006	1
93	Khan Shaheb Osman Ali Stadium	Fatullah	(Bangladesh) Bangladesh	9 April 2006	10 June 2015	2
94	Warner Park Stadium	Basseterre	(Saint Kitts and Nevis) Saint Kitts and Nevis	22 June 2006	20 May 2011	3
95	Sher-e-Bangla National Cricket Stadium	Mirpur	(Bangladesh) Bangladesh	25 May 2007	28 October 2026	31
96	University of Otago Oval	Dunedin	(New Zealand) New Zealand	4 January 2008	8 March 2017	8
97	Providence Stadium	Providence	(Guyana) Guyana	22 March 2008	15 August 2024	3
98	Sir Vivian Richards Stadium	St. John's	(Antigua and Barbuda) Antigua and Barbuda	30 May 2008	3 July 2026	15
99	Vidarbha Cricket Association Stadium	Nagpur	(India) India	6 November 2008	9 February 2023	7
100	Sophia Gardens	Cardiff	(Wales) Wales	8 July 2009	8 July 2015	3
101	Rajiv Gandhi International Cricket Stadium	Hyderabad	(India) India	12 November 2010	25 January 2024	6
102	Dubai International Cricket Stadium	Dubai	(United Arab Emirates) United Arab Emirates	12 November 2010	24 November 2018	13
103	Sheikh Zayed Cricket Stadium	Abu Dhabi	(United Arab Emirates) United Arab Emirates	20 November 2010	9 October 2026	16
104	Pallekele International Cricket Stadium	Pallekele	(Sri Lanka) Sri Lanka	1 December 2010	29 April 2021	9
105	Rose Bowl	Southampton	(England) England	16 June 2011	18 June 2021	7
106	Windsor Park	Roseau	(Dominica) Dominica	7 June 2011	12 July 2023	6
107	Sheikh Abu Naser Stadium	Khulna	(Bangladesh) Bangladesh	21 November 2012	28 April 2015	3
108	Hagley Oval	Christchurch	(New Zealand) New Zealand	26 December 2014	2 December 2025	15
109	Holkar Stadium	Indore	(India) India	8 October 2016	1 March 2023	3
110	Saurashtra Cricket Association Stadium	Rajkot	(India) India	9 November 2016	15 February 2024	3
111	Dr. Y. S. Rajasekhara Reddy International Cricket Stadium	Visakhapatnam	(India) India	17 November 2016	2 February 2024	3
112	Maharashtra Cricket Association Stadium	Pune	(India) India	23 February 2017	24 October 2024	3
113	JSCA International Stadium Complex	Ranchi	(India) India	16 March 2017	22 February 2024	3
114	Himachal Pradesh Cricket Association Stadium	Dharamshala	(India) India	25 March 2017	25 March 2024	2
115	Malahide Cricket Club Ground	Dublin	(Republic of Ireland) Ireland	11 May 2018	11 May 2018	1
116	Sylhet International Cricket Stadium	Sylhet	(Bangladesh) Bangladesh	3 November 2018	5 November 2026	7
117	Perth Stadium	Perth	(Australia) Australia	14 December 2018	21 November 2025	6
118	Manuka Oval	Canberra	(Australia) Australia	1 February 2019	1 February 2019	1
119	Rajiv Gandhi International Cricket Stadium	Dehradun	(India) India	15 March 2019	15 March 2019	1
120	Bay Oval	Mount Maunganui	(New Zealand) New Zealand	21 November 2019	18 December 2025	6
121	BRSABV Ekana Cricket Stadium	Lucknow	(India) India	27 November 2019	27 November 2019	1
122	Tolerance Oval	Abu Dhabi	(United Arab Emirates) United Arab Emirates	28 February 2024	28 February 2024	1
123	Stormont	Belfast	(Northern Ireland) Northern Ireland	25 July 2024	27 May 2026	2
124	Assam Cricket Association Stadium	Guwahati	(India) India	22 November 2025	22 November 2025	1
125	Maharaja Yadavindra Singh International Cricket Stadium	New Chandigarh	(India) India	6 June 2026	6 June 2026	1
126	Brian Lara Cricket Academy	San Fernando	(Trinidad and Tobago) Trinidad and Tobago	25 July 2026	25 July 2026	1
127	Great Barrier Reef Arena	Mackay	(Australia) Australia	22 August 2026	22 August 2026	1

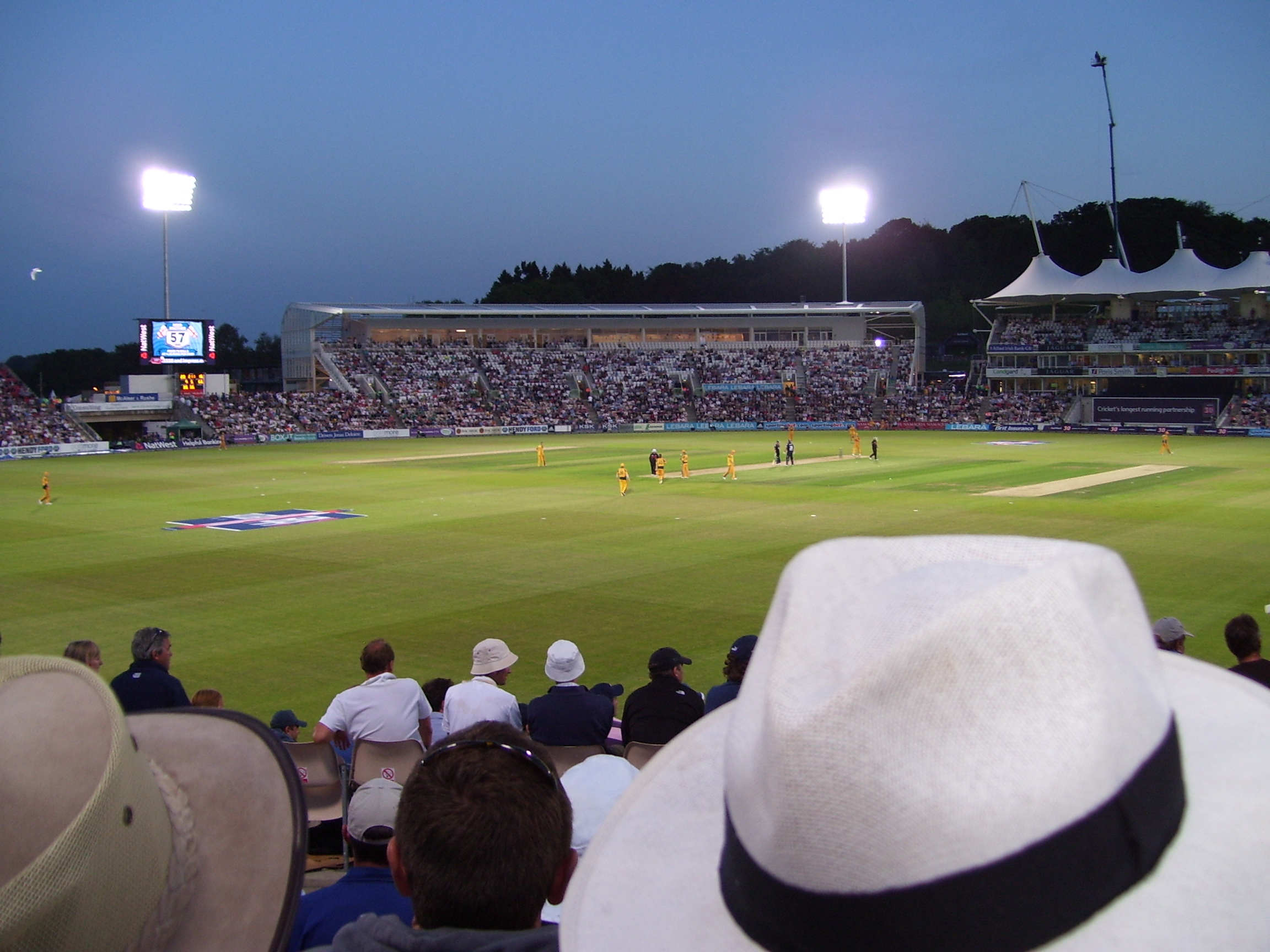
Rose Bowl, Southampton, England – used for the first time by England in June 2011.

^1 – 22 Tests from 1896 to 1939; not used for first-class cricket since 1946; redeveloped as Johannesburg Railway Station.
^2 – Staged only one Test; not used for cricket since 1973; home ground of Sheffield United F.C.
^3 – 4 Tests from 1910 to 1921; not used for first-class cricket since 1922; demolished.
^4 – Staged two Tests, one in 1928 and the other in 1931; not used for first-class cricket since 1931.
^5 – 6 Tests from 1948 to 1954; not used for first-class cricket since 1956; now used only for rugby union.
^6 – First used by Pakistan for 8 Tests, later for 9 Tests by Bangladesh, including the inaugural home Test for both sides, on 1 January 1955 and 10 November 2000 respectively. Used exclusively for football since March 2005.
^7 – Staged only one Test in 1992; subsequent Tests in Bulawayo played at the Queens Sports Club.
^8 – Hosted the first Day-Night Test match on 27 November 2015.

== Grounds by country ==
List of number of grounds by country up to 19 November 2026 (Test 2647): (Note: Cricinfo groups the individual countries of the West Indies together, but these have been separated for this list. Cricinfo also counts Welsh grounds under England and grounds from the Republic of Ireland and Northern Ireland together under Ireland; these have also been separated for this list.)

Country	No. of stadiums	Location of first match	City	Date of first match	No. of Tests
(Antigua and Barbuda) Antigua and Barbuda	2	Antigua Recreation Ground	St. John's	27 March 1981	37
(Australia) Australia	12	Melbourne Cricket Ground	Melbourne	15 March 1877	457
(Bangladesh) Bangladesh	8	National Stadium	Dhaka	1 January 1955	87
(Barbados) Barbados	1	Kensington Oval	Bridgetown	11 January 1930	56
(Dominica) Dominica	1	Windsor Park	Roseau	7 June 2011	6
(England) England	9	The Oval	London	6 September 1880	569
(Grenada) Grenada	1	Queen's Park	St. George's	28 June 2002	5
(Guyana) Guyana	2	Bourda	Georgetown	21 February 1930	33
(India) India	31	Bombay Gymkhana Ground	Mumbai	15 December 1933	301
(Republic of Ireland) Ireland	1	Malahide Cricket Club Ground	Dublin	11 May 2018	1
(Jamaica) Jamaica	1	Sabina Park	Kingston	3 April 1930	56
(New Zealand) New Zealand	9	Lancaster Park	Christchurch	10 January 1930	239
(Northern Ireland) Northern Ireland	1	Stormont	Belfast	25 July 2024	2
(Pakistan) Pakistan	16	Bahawal Stadium	Bahawalpur	15 January 1955	175
(Saint Kitts and Nevis) Saint Kitts and Nevis	1	Warner Park	Basseterre	22 June 2006	3
(Saint Lucia) Saint Lucia	1	Darren Sammy National Cricket Stadium	Rodney Bay	20 June 2003	10
(Saint Vincent and the Grenadines) Saint Vincent and the Grenadines	1	Arnos Vale Stadium	Kingstown	20 June 1997	3
(South Africa) South Africa	11	St George's Park Cricket Ground	Port Elizabeth	12 March 1889	258
(Sri Lanka) Sri Lanka	8	Paikiasothy Saravanamuttu Stadium	Colombo	17 February 1982	165
(Trinidad and Tobago) Trinidad and Tobago	2	Queen's Park Oval	Port of Spain	1 February 1930	65
(United Arab Emirates) United Arab Emirates	4	Sharjah Cricket Association Stadium	Sharjah	31 January 2002	41
(Wales) Wales	1	Sophia Gardens	Cardiff	8 July 2009	3
(Zimbabwe) Zimbabwe	3	Harare Sports Club	Harare	18 October 1992	74

== See also ==
- List of One Day International cricket grounds
- List of Twenty20 International cricket grounds
- List of women's Test cricket grounds
- List of cricket grounds by capacity
