= Sports Board Punjab =

Pakistani provincial sports governing body

- هیئت ورزشی پنجاب
- Sport: All
- Category: Sports
- Jurisdiction: Provincial
- Abbreviation: SBP
- Founded: 8 April 1985
- Affiliation: Pakistan Sports Board
- Regional affiliation: Punjab
- Headquarters: Lahore, Pakistan
- Location: National Hockey Stadium, Ferozepur Road, Lahore
- Director: Javid Rashid Chohan

Official website
- www.sportsboard.punjab.gov.pk
- (Pakistan)

Sports Board Punjab (or Punjab Sports Board) (SBP) is the governing body of sports in the Punjab province of Pakistan. It is administered by the Government of Punjab. The constitution of Sports Board Punjab was approved by the Governor of Punjab on 8 April 1985 for the development and regulation of sports in Punjab.

The Chief Minister of Punjab serves as the patron-in-chief of SBP. Muhammad Khizer Afzaal was the SBP director general as of November 2024.

SBP's headquarters are located at the National Hockey Stadium, Lahore.

== Functions ==
- To organize, promote and develop sports in the province.
- To arrange training and coaching programs.
- To ensure mass participation in sports and games by organizing sports competitions/tournaments in the province.
- To maintain liaison and coordinate with the Pakistan Sports Board, other provincial sports boards, national and provincial sports associations.
- To utilize funds provided by the government as grant-in-aid for the promotion of sports, and also release annual/special grants-in-aid to sports associations, committees, clubs and other sports organizations in the province.
- To register sports associations, hold their elections under the supervision of the board/district sports committees and to act as arbitrator for the resolution of the disputes among the parallel organizations.
- To provide extension services to the en-service personnel in the form of refresher courses, training and coaching programs, seminars, conferences and workshops etc.
- To promote and develop sports and games in the province, and lay down the general policy thereof.
- To ensure establishment of sports complexes at provincial, district and tehsil headquarters, permanent training and coaching centers, sports hostels, reception centers in the province.
- To exercise overall administrative/functional control over all the stadiums and play fields in the province, and ensure their proper maintenance and utilization.
- To ensure adequate provision of play fields allied facilities and equipment in the province.
- To ensure adequate provision of funds of sports and games in the budget of local councils and other institutions and their utilization to the fullest advantage for promotion and development of sports.
- To organize annual youth competitions of various age groups in different games.
- To support talent in various games.
- To provide incentives to prominent sportsmen, promising/deserving players and organizers by granting rewards/ scholarships/ honoria etc.
- To arrange production of films and publication of literature and establish reading facilities for the promotion and development of sports.
- To encourage and promote formation of clubs at district and tehsil level.
- To ensure availability of funds for sports facilities in the industrial/commercial concerns, and to arrange employment for sportsmen in the commercial concerns government/semi government organizations and autonomous bodies etc.
- To maintain liaison with all central/provincial government, semi government departments/agencies for effective implementation of the policies regarding promotion and development of sports and games.
- To keep liaison with all district coordination officers / deputy district officers/tehsil/town municipal officers in the province to ensure effective functioning of sports committees and associations for the projection of policies of the Government.
- To approve the annual budget.
- To ensure that grants given are utilized for the purpose and in accordance with the objects for which these are given.
- To do generally all such acts and take such steps as it considers necessary and conducive to achieve its aims and objects.

== Organizations ==
- Project Management Unit, SBP
- Punjab Sports Festival, divisional-level annual sports festival
- Punjab Youth Festival
- Punjab International Sports Festival
