= Lahore Race Club =

Horse racing venue in Lahore, Punjab, Pakistan

- Interactive map of Lahore Race Club
- Location: Lahore, Punjab, Pakistan
- Coordinates: 31°26′20″N 74°19′58″E
- Date opened: 1924
- Race type: Horse racing
- Course type: Grass

Lahore Race Club, in Lahore, Punjab, Pakistan, is a horse racing club established in 1924 when Lahore was part of the Punjab Province of British India.

== History ==
The club is registered as a company. Some veterans claim that it dates from 1874, and although horse races were organized in Lahore during that period, but the formal record of the present club does not go back so far. It was incorporated on 18 January 1924.

The club's racecourse was initially at Jail Road, Lahore, the current site of Jilani Park. In 1976, Zulfikar Ali Bhutto's government asked the club to move its races away from the Jail Road course, but it remained there until 1980, when it was compelled to leave.

Races were not held for about fifteen months, but in September 1981 the club reinstated its racing programme on a new course at Kot Lakhpat which has a length of 2,254 metres. Since then, it has gained in strength and now organizes, among other races, the Pakistan Derby.

In June 2005, the club hosted Pakistan's first evening horse race under floodlights. The opening ceremony was attended by Pervez Musharraf, President of Pakistan, and Mohammed bin Rashid Al Maktoum, crown prince of Dubai, who had financed the night-racing project, the cost of which was some Rs 30 million.

== See also ==
- Karachi Race Club
