= Queen's Park (1887) =

Cricket stadium

Ground information
- Location: Grenada
- Establishment: 1887
- Owner: West Indies Cricket Board
- Operator: Windward Islands cricket team
- Tenants: Windward Islands cricket team

International information
- Only ODI: 7 April 1983: West Indies v India

The Queen's Park was a cricket stadium on River Road, Grenada. A Grenada cricket team first appeared in West Indian cricket in 1887 against a touring Gentlemen of America team at the old Queen's Park. Ten years later the team was recorded playing against Lord Hawke's touring team although, unlike several matches during the tour, that match did not have first-class status. In 1899, G. A. de Freitas and William Mignon became the first Grenada cricketers to play first-class cricket.

The ground was replaced by the National Cricket Stadium.

== See also ==
- National Cricket Stadium (Grenada)
