= Abbottabad Hockey Stadium =

Field hockey stadium in Abbottabad, Pakistan

- ایبٹ آباد ہاکی سٹیڈیم
- Interactive map of Abbottabad Hockey Stadium
- Location: Abbottabad, Khyber Pakhtunkhwa, Pakistan
- Coordinates: 34.1434794°N 73.21255°E
- Owner: Abbottabad District Government
- Capacity: 3000
- Surface: AstroTurf

Construction
- Opened: 1988; 38 years ago

The Abbottabad Hockey Stadium is a field hockey stadium in Abbottabad in the Khyber Pakhtunkhwa province of Pakistan. Located at Circular Road, it was built in 1988. No international matches have taken place there yet, but the stadium has hosted various national, divisional and local tournaments, as well as national team camps.

It has an AstroTurf surface. Currently, proposals are being made for upgrading the stadium, by adding a pavilion, dressing rooms and stands for spectators.
