= List of cricket grounds in Pakistan =

This is a list of cricket grounds in Pakistan that have been used for first-class, List A and international cricket matches. For grounds used in international cricket, see the map and the notes column.

== List of grounds ==
Locations of all stadiums which have hosted an international cricket match within Pakistan

Grounds listed in bold have hosted at least one international cricket match.

For grounds listed in italics, the name and exact location used is unknown.

For grounds that share the same NAME, the city the ground is in is listed in brackets to avoid confusion.

Name	City	Province	Capacity	Image
**Imran Khan Cricket Stadium**	Peshawar	Khyber Pakhtunkhwa	35,000	
**National Stadium**	Karachi	Sindh	30,000	
**Multan Cricket Stadium**	Multan	Punjab	30,000	
**Gaddafi Stadium**	Lahore	Punjab	27,000	
**Rawalpindi Cricket Stadium**	Rawalpindi	Punjab	20,000	
**Qayyum Stadium**	Peshawar	Khyber Pakhtunkhwa	20,000	
**Jinnah Stadium**	Gujranwala	Punjab	20,000	
**Bugti Stadium**	Quetta	Balochistan	20,000	
**Sargodha Cricket Stadium**	Sargodha	Punjab	20,000	
**Ibn-e-Qasim Bagh Stadium**	Multan	Punjab	18,000	
**Iqbal Stadium**	Faisalabad	Punjab	18,000	
**Quaid-e-Azam Stadium**	Mirpur	Azad Kashmir	16,000	
**Bahawal Stadium**	Bahawalpur	Punjab	15,000	
**Niaz Stadium**	Hyderabad	Sindh	15,000	
**Pindi Club Ground**	Rawalpindi	Punjab	15,000	
**Sheikhupura Stadium**	Sheikupura	Punjab	15,000	
**Marghzar Cricket Ground**	Islamabad	Islamabad Capital Territory	15,000	
**Jinnah Stadium**	Sialkot	Punjab	15,000	
Hayatabad Sports Complex	Peshawar	Khyber Pakhtunkhwa	10,000	
Bilawal Cricket Stadium	Benazirabad	Sindh	10,000	
Muzaffarabad Cricket Stadium	Muzaffarabad	Azad Kashmir	10,000	
**Southend Club Cricket Stadium**	Karachi	Sindh	10,000	
Zahoor Elahi Stadium	Gujrat	Punjab	10,000	
Shaheed Mohtarama Benazir Bhutto International Cricket Stadium	Garhi Khuda Bakhsh	Sindh	10,000	
**Zafar Ali Stadium**	Sahiwal	Punjab	10,000	
Zamir Jaffri Cricket Stadium	Jhelum	Punjab	10,000	
Shoaib Akhtar Stadium	Rawalpindi	Punjab	8,000	
Asghar Ali Shah Cricket Stadium	Karachi	Sindh	8,000	
Abbottabad Cricket Stadium	Abbottabad	Khyber Pakhtunkhwa	4,000	
National Bank of Pakistan Sports Complex	Karachi	Sindh	1,000	

== See also ==
- List of stadiums in Pakistan
- List of sports venues in Karachi
- List of sports venues in Lahore
- List of sports venues in Faisalabad
- Lists of stadiums
