= Zahoor Elahi Stadium =

Cricket ground in Gujrat, Pakistan

Zahoor Elahi Stadium ظہور الہی اسٹیڈیم
- Horse show ground
- Interactive map of Zahoor Elahi Stadium ظہور الہی اسٹیڈیم

Ground information
- Location: Gujrat
- Country: Pakistan
- Coordinates: 32°35′8″N 74°4′55″E
- Establishment: 2001
- Capacity: 10000
- Owner: Gujrat district government
- Tenants: Gujrat Cricket Association, Pakistan Cricket Board
- End names
- Pavilion End; The Other End

Team information
Gujrat cricket team	(2001 – present)
Gujrat Under-19s	(2001 – present)
- As of 29 April 2016; Source

Zahoor Elahi Stadium (Urdu: ظہور الہی اسٹیڈیم) is a cricket ground in Gujrat, in the Punjab province of Pakistan. This stadium regularly hosts Inter-district and Inter-region tournaments. It has also hosted a total of 14 grade-II cricket matches and one first-class match. It is the home ground of Gujrat cricket team and the Gujrat Under-19s.

The stadium is named after politician Chaudhry Zahoor Elahi.

== Ground History ==
Zahoor Elahi Stadium was previously known as the Horse Show Ground, as horse show used to be held there annually until the late 1990s. It was rebuilt in 2001 and 2002. After the renovation in March 2002 the ground was renamed as Zahoor Elahi Stadium after the late politician.

== Cricket History ==
Zahoor Elahi Stadium has never hosted an international match and as of now it is not recognized as a first-class cricket ground by Pakistan Cricket Board thus it no longer hosts first-class matches. However, it has served as the home ground for the Gujrat cricket team in a number of other tournaments including Inter-district senior and under-19 tournaments.

=== First-class Matches ===
Zahoor Elahi Stadium hosted its only first-class match during the group stage of 2012–13 Quaid-e-Azam Trophy on 28 December 2012.

==== Scorecard Sialkot vs Lahore Ravi ====
28–31 December 2012
Scorecard

Sialkot	v	Lahore Ravi
1st innings forfeited		1st innings forfeited
117/1d (63 overs); Naved Sarwar 50* (205); Asif Ashfaq 1/34 (10 overs)		28/1 (11 overs); Irfan Haider 23* (35); Mohammad Imran 1/20 (4 overs)

Match drawn
Zahoor Elahi Stadium, Gujrat
Umpires: Kamal Marchant and Raweed Khan

- Lahore Ravi won the toss and elected to field first
- Points Sialkot 2 points, Lahore Ravi 2 points

=== Grade II Matches ===
Zahoor Elahi stadium hosted 14 grade II matches during year 2001 and 2003.

==== Under-19 Tournament (Grade II) 2001/02 ====
Zahoor Elahi stadium hosted its first match during the 2001/02 season of grade II under-19 tournament. It hosted a total of three matches during that season.

1, 2 September 2001
Scorecard

Gujrat Under-19s	v	Khanewal Under-19s

Gujrat Under-19s won by 107 runs
Zahoor Elahi Stadium, Gujrat

- Gujrat Under-19s won the toss and decided to bat first
- Points: Gujrat 12 points, Khanewal 0 points

4, 5 September 2001
Scorecard

Gujrat Under-19s	v	Hafizabad Under-19s

Match drawn
Zahoor Elahi Stadium, Gujrat

- Hafizabad Under-19s won the toss and decided to field first
- Points: Gujrat 0 points, Hafizabad 0 points

7, 8 September 2001
Scorecard

Hafizabad Under-19s	v	Khanewal Under-19s

Hafizabad Under-19s won by 125 runs
Zahoor Elahi Stadium, Gujrat

- Hafizabad Under-19s won the toss and decided to bat first
- Points: Hafizabad 9 points, Khanewal 0 points

==== Quaid-e-Azam Trophy (Grade II) 2001/02 ====
Zahoor Elahi stadium also hosted three matches from Quaid-e-Azam trophy during the season 2001/02

15, 16 October 2001
Scorecard

Gujrat	v	Khanewal

Match drawn
Zahoor Elahi Stadium, Gujrat

- Khanewal won the toss and decided to bat first
- Points: Gujrat 3 points, Khanewal 0 points

18, 19 October 2001
Scorecard

Hafizabad	v	Khanewal

Match drawn
Zahoor Elahi Stadium, Gujrat

- Khanewal won the toss and decided to bat first
- Points: Hafizabad 3 points, Khanewal 0 points

21, 22 October 2001
Scorecard

Gujrat	v	Hafizabad

Gujrat won by 8 wickets
Zahoor Elahi Stadium, Gujrat

- Gujrat won the toss and decided to bat first
- Points: Gujrat 12 points, Hafizabad points 0

==== Under-19 Tournament (Grade II) 2002/03 ====
Zahoor Elahi stadium hosted 5 matches during season 2002/03 of grade II Under-19s tournament

1–3 September 2002
Scorecard

Gujrat Under-19s	v	Mianwali Under-19s

Match drawn
Zahoor Elahi Stadium, Gujrat

- Gujrat Under-19s won the toss and decided to bat first
- Points: Gujrat 0 points, Mianwali 3 points

6–8 September 2002
Scorecard

Gujrat Under-19s	v	Attock Under-19s

Gujrat Under-19s won by 16 runs
Zahoor Elahi Stadium, Gujrat

- Attock Under-19s won the toss and decided to field first
- Points: Gujrat 12 points, Attock 0 points

11–13 September 2002
Scorecard

Gujrat Under-19s	v	Lahore Under-19s

Match drawn
Zahoor Elahi Stadium, Gujrat

- Gujrat Under-19s won the toss and decided to field first
- Points: Gujrat 3 points, Lahore Greens 0 points

16–18 September 2002
Scorecard

Gujrat Under-19s	v	Sialkot Under-19s

Match drawn
Zahoor Elahi Stadium, Gujrat

- Sialkot Under-19s won the toss and decided to field first
- Points: Gujrat 3 points, Sialkot 0 points

21, 22 September 2001
Scorecard

Lahore Greens Under-19s	v	Mianwali Under-19s

Mianwali Under-19s won by 10 wickets
Zahoor Elahi Stadium, Gujrat

- Mianwali Under-19s won the toss and decided to field first
- Points: Lahore Greens 0 points, Mianwali 12 points

==== Cornelius Trophy 2002/03 ====
Zahoor Elahi stadium hosted another 3 grade II matches during the Cornellius Trophy 2002/03

21–23 January 2003
Scorecard

Gujrat	v	Okara

Match Drawn
Zahoor Elahi Stadium, Gujrat

- Gujrat won the toss and decided to field first
- Points: Gujrat 0 points, Okara 0 points

2–3 February 2003
Scorecard

Gujrat	v	Afghanistan

Gujrat won by 10 wickets
Zahoor Elahi Stadium, Gujrat

- Gujrat won the toss and decided to field first
- Points: Gujrat 12 points, Afghanistan 0 points

January, 2003
Scorecard

Gujrat	v	Rajanpur

Gujrat won by an innings and 56 runs
Zahoor Elahi Stadium, Gujrat

- Rajanpur won the toss and decided to bat first
- Points: Gujrat 12 points, Rajanpur 0 points

=== Other Matches ===
As of 2014 Zahoor Elahi stadium regularly hosts matches from different Inter-district and Inter-region/department tournaments. The stadium has also hosted a number of charity matches

== Other Events ==
Zahoor Elahi Stadium has been used for a number of purposes beside cricket.

=== Election Campaigns ===
This stadium gets a fair share of political jamborees often during election days. Recent example being PTI's jalsa during which the stadium accommodated almost 10,000 people

=== Industrial Exhibition ===
The stadium has also been the host to all 6 Industrial exhibitions conducted by Gujrat chamber of commerce annually.

=== Charity Matches ===
More than a couple of charity matches have been held at Zahoor Elahi Stadium. Such as a T20 exhibition match on 4 May 2012 saw a number of international cricketers such including former captain Shahid Afridi, Shoaib Malik, Imran Nazir, Abdul Razaq, Kamran Akmal and Umar Akmal. Another such match in July 2014 saw huge attendance.

=== Punjab Youth Festival ===
Zahoor elahi stadium is recognized as a sports facility by sports board Punjab and it regularly hosts competitions which are part of Punjab youth Festival.

=== Other Sports ===
The Ground often hosts local Kabaddi matches. It is also known to be the host of Jashn-e-baharan sports festival.
