= Karachi Race Club =

Race course in Karachi, Pakistan

- Interactive map of Karachi Race Club
- Location: Malir Cantonment, Karachi, Sindh, Pakistan
- Coordinates: 24°55′56″N 67°09′55″E
- Operated by: Karachi Race Club
- Date opened: 1913
- Race type: Thoroughbred – Flat racing
- Course type: Grass
- Notable races: Quaid-e-Azam Gold Cup; Karachi Derby; New Year Cup
- Attendance: 3000

Karachi Race Club (KRC) is the biggest race course of Pakistan, located in Malir cantonment, Karachi.

== History ==
The Karachi Race Club was established in 1876.

The racing continued at the old site behind the Karachi Cantonment railway station up to 1987. In 1989 the race club shifted to the present location at Deh Safroon, Main University Road, Malir Cantonment, in Karachi. Seven to ten races are held at the KRC every Sunday.

== Yearly races ==
There are only 3 races about 1800 metres to 2400 metres yearly. The Quaid-e-Azam Gold Cup current distance is about 2400 metres (1 mile 4 furlongs).

- Quaid-e-Azam Gold Cup
- Karachi Derby
- New Year Cup

== See also ==
- Lahore Race Club
- List of horse racing venues
