= Jinnah Stadium, Sialkot =

Cricket ground in Sialkot, Pakistan

- Jinnah Park
- Interactive map of Jinnah Stadium, Sialkot

Ground information
- Location: Sialkot, Punjab, Pakistan
- Country: Pakistan
- Coordinates: 32°30′3″N 74°33′14″E
- Establishment: 1909; 117 years ago
- Capacity: 15,000
- Owner: Pakistan Cricket Board
- Tenants: Pakistan national cricket team
- End names
- Pavilion End; Railway End

International information
- First men's Test: 27 October 1985: Pakistan v Sri Lanka
- Last men's Test: 22 September 1995: Pakistan v Sri Lanka
- First men's ODI: 16 October 1976: Pakistan v New Zealand
- Last men's ODI: 6 December 1996: Pakistan v New Zealand

Team information
Sialkot cricket team	(1955-2016)
Sialkot Stallions	(2003-2019)
- As of 10 October 2008; Source: CricketArchive

Jinnah Stadium, Sialkot (Urdu: جناح اسٹیڈیم), formerly known as Connelly Park or Jinnah Park), is a cricket ground in Sialkot, Pakistan. It is one of the oldest cricket grounds in Pakistan, having been built in the early part of the twentieth century.

== History ==
The stadium was founded in 1909 during the British Raj. It was named "Connelly Park" after the then British Deputy Commissioner of Sialkot, Mr. Connelly. In the 1950s, it was named Jinnah Park after the founding father of Pakistan. In 1979, it was upgraded to a stadium with a new pavilion and seating. It was the home ground of Sialkot Stallions.

The inaugural first-class match at the ground was held between Marylebone Cricket Club and Punjab in November 1951. The first Test match at Jinnah Stadium was played in 1985, and the most recent one in 1995.

Pakistan played its first-ever ODI at home on this ground in 1976 against New Zealand, which was also the first ODI between New Zealand and Pakistan. Jinnah Stadium is known for its green-top pitches that help fast bowlers. Credit for these green-top pitches goes to the curator, Abdul Ghani, who has prepared pitches for all international matches played here (4 Tests and 9 ODIs).

In 1984, the Pakistan-India ODI here was stopped midway and abandoned after news of the assassination of the Indian PM, Indira Gandhi, reached the ground. India were batting.

During the India tour to Pakistan in 1989, the 4th Test of the series was played in this stadium. During India's 2nd innings, Sachin Tendulkar was badly injured by a Waqar Younis bouncer. However, he returned to bat later and scored 57 runs, helping to save the Test match and the series for India.

In this stadium, India scored its lowest ODI total of 79 all out, against Pakistan during their 1978/79 tour.

In 2016, Sialkot Cricket Academy was established at the stadium. In September 2019, the Pakistan Cricket Board named the stadium as one of the venues for hosting matches in the 2019–20 Quaid-e-Azam Trophy.

In November 2021, it was announced that Rs. 810 million had been released for the upgradation of the stadium, with plans for future Pakistan Super League to be hosted there. On 27 September 2022, the former Prime Minister of Pakistan, Imran Khan, inaugurated the upgradation of Jinnah Stadium Sialkot.

However, in August 2024, it was revealed that work on the renovation of the stadium had stopped due to the non-availability of funds.

== Records ==
=== Test ===
- Highest Team Total: Pakistan 423/5d v Sri Lanka 12 Dec 1991
- Lowest Team Total: Sri Lanka 157 v Pakistan 27 Oct 1985
- Highest Individual Score:Moin Khan Pakistan vs Sri Lanka 22 Sep 1995
- Highest Partnership: Saleem Malik and Imran Khan 132, Pakistan vs Sri Lanka 1991
- Best Bowling:Ravi Ratnayeke Sri Lanka 8/83 27 Oct 1985

=== One Day International ===
- Highest team total: 277/9 Pakistan v New Zealand 6 Dec 1996
- Lowest team total: 79 India v Pakistan 13 Oct 1978
- Highest individual score:114 Rameez Raja Pakistan v New Zealand 6 Nov 1990
- Highest partnership:Saeed Anwar and Zahoor Elahi 177 (1st) Pakistan v New Zealand 6 Dec 1996
- Best Bowling:Waqar Younis 5/16 Pakistan v New Zealand 6 Nov 1990

== List of centuries ==
=== Key ===
- * denotes that the batsman was not out.
- Inns. denotes the number of the innings in the match.
- Balls denotes the number of balls faced in an innings.
- NR denotes that the number of balls was not recorded.
- Parentheses next to the player's score denotes his century number at Edgbaston.
- The column title Date refers to the date the match started.
- The column title Result refers to the player's team result

=== Test centuries ===
This is the list of centuries scored in Test matches at Jinnah Stadium, Sialkot

No.	Score	Player	Team	Balls	Inns.	Opposing team	Date	Result
1	101	Saleem Malik	Pakistan	207	2	Sri Lanka	12 December 1991	Drawn
2	117*	Moin Khan	Pakistan	208	4	Sri Lanka	22 September 1995	Lost

=== One Day Internationals ===
Only one One-day international century has been scored at Jinnah Stadium, Sialkot

No.	Score	Player	Team	Balls	Inns.	Opposing team	Date	Result
1	114	Rameez Raja	Pakistan	123	1	New Zealand	6 November 1990	Won

== List of five-wicket hauls ==
=== Key ===
Symbol	Meaning
†	The bowler was man of the match
‡	10 or more wickets taken in the match
§	One of two five-wicket hauls by the bowler in the match
Date	Day the Test started or ODI was held
Inn	Innings in which five-wicket haul was taken
Overs	Number of overs bowled.
Runs	Number of runs conceded
Wkts	Number of wickets taken
Econ	Runs conceded per over
Batsmen	Batsmen whose wickets were taken
Drawn	The match was drawn.

=== Tests ===
This is a list of five-wicket hauls taken at Jinnah Stadium, Sialkot in Test matches.

No.	Bowler	Date	Team	Opposing team	Inn	Overs	Runs	Wkts	Econ	Result
1	Ravi Ratnayeke †	27 October 1985	Sri Lanka	Pakistan	2	23.2	83	8	3.55	
2	Imran Khan	27 October 1985	Pakistan	Sri Lanka	3	18.3	40	5	2.16	Won
3	Wasim Akram	9 December 1989	Pakistan	India	1	28.2	101	5	3.56	Drawn
4	Vivek Razdan	9 December 1989	India	Pakistan	2	27	79	5	2.92	Drawn
5	Waqar Younis	12 December 1991	Pakistan	Sri Lanka	1	30.5	84	5	2.72	Drawn

=== One Day Internationals ===
This is a list of five-wicket hauls taken at Jinnah Stadium, Sialkot in One-day Internationals.

No.	Bowler	Date	Team	Opposing team	Inn	Overs	Runs	Wkts	Econ	Result
1	Waqar Younis	6 November 1990	Pakistan	New Zealand	2	6	18	5	2.66	Won
2	Chris Harris	6 December 1996	New Zealand	Pakistan	1	10	42	5	4.20	Lost

== See also ==
- List of Test cricket grounds
- List of stadiums in Pakistan
- List of cricket grounds in Pakistan
