= Sheikhupura Stadium =

Stadium in Sheikhupura, Punjab, Pakistan

Coordinates: 31.708°N 73.975°E

- Interactive map of Sheikhupura Stadium

Ground information
- Location: Sheikhupura, Punjab, Pakistan
- Country: Pakistan
- Capacity: 15,000
- Owner: Pakistan Cricket

International information
- First men's Test: 17 October 1996: Pakistan v Zimbabwe
- Last men's Test: 17 October 1997: Pakistan v South Africa
- First men's ODI: 22 November 1998: Pakistan v Zimbabwe
- Last men's ODI: 2 February 2008: Pakistan v Zimbabwe
- As of 29 November 2016; Source: ESPNcricinfo

Sheikhupura Stadium is a multi-purpose stadium in the city of Sheikhupura in Punjab province of Pakistan. It is currently used mostly for cricket matches. The stadium can accommodate 15,000 spectators and hosted its first Test match in 1996, when Pakistan played Zimbabwe. This was followed by another Test a year later, between Pakistan and South Africa.

Sheikhupura Stadium has hosted two one-day internationals so far, both between Pakistan and Zimbabwe, both teams winning a match apiece.

== International centuries ==
=== Test centuries ===
The following table summarises the Test centuries scored at Sheikhupura Stadium.

No.	Score	Player	Team	Balls	Inns.	Opposing team	Date	Result
1	110	Grant Flower	Zimbabwe	287	1	Pakistan	17 October 1996	Drawn
2	106*	Paul Strang	Zimbabwe	207	1	Pakistan	17 October 1996	Drawn
3	257*	Wasim Akram	Pakistan	362	2	Zimbabwe	17 October 1996	Drawn

=== One Day International centuries ===
The following table summarises the One Day International centuries scored at Sheikhupura Stadium.

No.	Score	Player	Team	Balls	Inns.	Opposing team	Date	Result
1	103	Neil Johnson	Zimbabwe	120	2	Pakistan	22 November 1998	Won

== List of Five Wicket Hauls ==
=== Tests ===
The following table summarises the five wicket hauls taken in Tests at Sheikhupura Stadium.

No.	Bowler	Date	Team	Opposing team	Inn	Overs	Runs	Wkts	Econ	Result
1	Shahid Nazir	17 October 1996	Pakistan	Zimbabwe	1	22.4	53	5	2.33	Drawn
2	Paul Strang	17 October 1996	Zimbabwe	Pakistan	2	69	212	5	3.07	Drawn

== See also ==
- List of stadiums in Pakistan
