= Sialkot Hockey Stadium =

Pakistani field hockey stadium

Coordinates: 32°28′22.09″N 74°33′15.95″E

- سیالکوٹ ہاکی سٹیڈیم
- Interactive map of Sialkot Hockey Stadium
- Location: Sialkot, Punjab, Pakistan
- Owner: Sialkot District Government
- Operator: Pakistan Hockey Federation
- Capacity: 5,000
- Surface: AstroTurf
- Acreage: 25 acres (10 ha)

Construction
- Groundbreaking: 2004
- Opened: 2008; 18 years ago
- Cost: PKR 1002 Million

Tenants
- Silkot District Hockey Team; Crescent Hockey Club

Sialkot Hockey Stadium is a field hockey stadium in Sialkot, Punjab, Pakistan. It has an AstroTurf surface. It was constructed at a cost of Rs. 45 million, and was completed in 2018.

Arrangements are being finalised to upgrade the stadium, at a cost of Rs 1,002 million, by adding a pavilion, dressing rooms and stands for spectators. The stadium is located at Pasrur Road, near Gulsahan-i-Iqbal Park.

It hosted its first international match between Indian Junior Hockey Team and Pakistan Junior Hockey Team on 18 November 2008.
