= Zafar Ali Stadium =

Pakistani Sports ground

- Interactive map of Zafar Ali Stadium

Ground information
- Location: Sahiwal, Punjab, Pakistan
- Country: Pakistan
- Coordinates: 30°39′37″N 73°06′00″E
- Establishment: 1955
- Capacity: 10,000
- Tenants: Sargodha Cricket Team

International information
- First men's ODI: 23 December 1977: Pakistan v England
- Last men's ODI: 3 November 1978: Pakistan v India
- As of 1 January 2017; Source: ESPNcricinfo

Zafar Ali Stadium is a multi-purpose stadium in Sahiwal, Punjab, Pakistan. From 1955 until 1995, it was used for first-class and List A cricket matches. The stadium can accommodate 10,000 spectators.

The venue, formerly known as Sahiwal Stadium, was renamed as Zafar Ali Stadium in honor of Sheikh Zafar Ali Khan, the founder of the Pakistan Olympic Association.

In 2025, a synthetic 800-metre athletic track was completed at the stadium.
