= List of sports venues in Lahore =

This is a list of sports venues in Lahore, Punjab, Pakistan.

== List ==
Stadium	Capacity	Game(s)	Tenants	Image
National Hockey Stadium	45,000	Hockey	Pakistan national field hockey team	
Gaddafi Stadium	34,000	Cricket	Lahore Qalandars, Lahore cricket teams, Pakistan International Airlines cricket team and Pakistan Cricket Team	
Punjab Stadium	15,000	Football	Pakistan national football team	
Railway Stadium	5,000	Football	Pakistan Railways	
Lahore City Cricket Association Ground		Cricket		
Lahore Gymkhana Club		Sports complex		
Lahore Race Club		Horse racing		
Defence Raya Golf and Country Club		Golf course		
Lahore Garrison Golf and Country Club		Golf course		
Royal Palm Golf and Country Club		Golf course		
Samanabad Sports Arena		Sports complex		
Lahore Rugby Football Club		Rugby club		

== See also ==
- List of stadiums in Pakistan
- List of cricket grounds in Pakistan
- List of sports venues in Karachi
- List of sports venues in Faisalabad
- List of parks and gardens in Lahore
- List of tallest buildings in Lahore
