= List of sports venues in Karachi =

This is a list of sports venues in Karachi, the capital of Sindh province in Pakistan.

== List ==
Stadium	Capacity	Game(s)	Tenants	Image
People's Football Stadium	40,000	Football	Pakistan national football team	
Abdul Sattar Edhi Hockey Stadium	30,000	Hockey	Pakistan national field hockey team	
National Stadium	30,000	Cricket	Karachi cricket team, Karachi Dolphins, Karachi Zebras, Karachi Kings, Pakistan International Airlines cricket team, Pakistan national cricket team	
KMC Football Stadium	15,000	Football		
KPT Football Stadium	15,000	Football	Karachi Port Trust	
Southend Club Cricket Stadium	10,000	Cricket		
Asghar Ali Shah Cricket Stadium	8,000	Cricket		
Drigh Road Union Football Stadium	5,000	Football		
Karachi Race Club	3,000	Horse racing		
Karachi United Stadium	2,000	Football	Karachi United	
National Bank of Pakistan Sports Complex	1,000	Sports complex	National Bank of Pakistan cricket team	
State Bank of Pakistan Sports Complex		Sports complex		
United Bank Limited Sports Complex		Sports complex		
City Sports Complex		Sports complex		
Karachi Gymkhana		Sports complex		
Women Sports Complex		Sports complex		
Arabian Sea Country Club		Golf course		
Karachi Golf Club		Golf course		

== Future projects ==
Stadium	Capacity	Game(s)	City	Province	Tenants
Rafi Cricket Stadium	50,000	Cricket	Karachi	Sindh	Pakistan national cricket team, Karachi Kings

== See also ==
- Sport in Pakistan
- List of sports venues in Pakistan
- List of stadiums in Pakistan
- List of cricket grounds in Pakistan
- List of sports venues in Faisalabad
- List of sports venues in Lahore
