= List of sports venues in Faisalabad =

The following is a list of major sports venues in Faisalabad, the second most populous city in the Punjab province of Pakistan.

== List ==
Stadium	Capacity	Game(s)	City	Province	Tenants	Image
Faisalabad Hockey Stadium	25,000	Hockey	Faisalabad	Punjab	Pakistan national field hockey team	
Iqbal Stadium	18,000	Cricket	Faisalabad	Punjab	Faisalabad cricket team, Faisalabad Wolves, Pakistan national cricket team	
Railways Ground	5,000	Football	Faisalabad	Punjab	Lyallpur FC	

== See also ==
- List of stadiums in Pakistan
- List of cricket grounds in Pakistan
- List of sports venues in Karachi
- List of sports venues in Lahore
