= List of hospitals in Punjab, Pakistan =

Hospitals of Punjab by cities

Punjab is the most populous province of Pakistan, and the second-largest by land area. According to the 2017 Census of Pakistan, it had a population of 110 million. In 2017, there were 88 tehsil-level hospitals (THQ), 34 district hospitals (DHQ), and 23 teaching hospitals in Punjab, Pakistan.

A list of hospitals in major cities of Punjab, Pakistan is given below.

== Lahore ==
Lahore is the most popular city in Punjab, Pakistan. It has both public and private hospitals that are facilitating a large number of people from different areas of Pakistan. The list of hospitals in Lahore, Pakistan includes the following hospital:

- Doctors Hospital
- Hameed Latif Hospital
- Ittefaq Hospital (Trust)
- National Hospital & Medical Center
- Punjab Institute of Cardiology
- Services Institute of Medical Sciences
- Sharif Medical City Hospital
- Shaukat Khanum Memorial Cancer Hospital & Research Centre
- Sir Ganga Ram Hospital
- Surgimed Hospital
- Pakistan Kidney and Liver Institute
- Jinnah Hospital, Lahore
- Mayo Hospital(Largest Hospital of Pakistan)

== Faisalabad ==
Faisalabad aka Lyallpur has the following hospitals.

- Al Noor Hospital
- DHQ Hospital
- Allied Hospital
  - Lyallpur Eye Trust
- F.I.C Hospital
- Punjab Institute of Nuclear Medicine PINUM
- Prime Care Hospital
- Punjab Social Security Hospital
- St. Raphael's Hospital

== Gujranwala ==
Gujranwala aka City of Wrestlers have both public and private hospitals. The list of hospitals in Gujranwala district, contains following hospitals.

- Bhatti Hospital, Gujranwala
- Central Hospital, Gujranwala
- Chaudary Hospital, Gujranwala
- Citi Medicare Hospital, Gujranwala
- Chathah Hospital, Gujranwala
- DHQ Teaching Hospital, Gujranwala
- Combined Military Hospital, Gujranwala
- GINUM Cancer Hospital, Gujranwala
- Gondal Hospital, Gujranwala
- Medcare Hospital, Gujranwala
- Siddique Sadiq Hospital, Gujranwala
- Social Security Hospital, Gujranwala
- Taiba hospital, Gujranwala
- THQ Hospital, Kamonki
- THQ Hospital, Nowshehra Virkan
- THQ Hospital, Wazirabad
- Tuberculosis Hospital, Gujranwala
- Wapda Hospital, Gujranwala
- Wazirabad Cardiology Institute, Wazirabad

== Gujrat ==
Gujrat District contains the following hospitals.

- Army Burn Centre, Kharian
- Aziz Bhatti Shaheed DHQ Teaching Hospital Gujrat
- Civil Hospital, Jalalpure Jattan
- Combined Military Hospital, Kharian
- THQ Hospital, Kharian
- THQ Hospital, Sarai Aalamgir

== Hafizabad ==
The list of hospitals in Hafizabad District is following.

- DHQ Hospital, Hafizabad

== Jhang ==
Jhang District contains the following hospitals

- DHQ Hospital, Jhang
- Ali Ahmad Khan Hospital, Jhang
- THQ hospital, Jhang

== Jhelum ==
Hospitals operating in Jhelum District are following.

- DHQ Hospital, Jhelum
- Combined Military Hospital Jhelum
- Fauji Foundation Hospital, Jhelum
- THQ Hospital, Pind Dadan Khan
- THQ Hospital, Sohawa

== Kasur ==
Kasur District contains the following hospitals.

- DHQ Hospital, Kasur
- Wali Hospital Kasur
- Nawaz Memorial Hospital
- Balqees Hospital
- Kasur City Hospital

== Khanewal ==
The list of hospitals in Khanewal District is following.

- DHQ Hospital, Khanewal

== Khushab ==
Hospitals operating in Khushab District are following

- DHQ Hospital, Khushab

== Layyah ==
Layyah District contains the following hospitals.

- DHQ Hospital, Layyah

== Lodhran ==
Lodhran District has following hospitals.

- DHQ Hospital, Lodhran
- Fatima Medical & Welfare Hospital
- Fatima Medical And Welfare Trust Hospital (Chak No.362/WB), Dunyapur Tehsil

== Mandi Bahauddin ==
Hospitals operating in Mandi Bahauddin District are following

- DHQ Hospital, Mandi Bahauddin
- THQ Hospital, Phalia
- THQ Hospital, Malakwal

== Mianwali ==
The list of hospitals in Mianwali District is following.

- DHQ Hospital, Mianwali
- THQ Hospital, Isakhel
- THQ Hospital, Piplan
- THQ Hospital, Kalabagh
- Obaid Noor Hospital
- P.A.E.C Hospital, Chashma Barrage
- P.A.F. Hospital, Mianwali

== Multan ==
City of the Saints, Multan, contains the following hospitals.

- Bakhtawar Amin Memorial Hospital Multan
- Chaudhry Pervaiz Elahi Institute of Cardiology Multan
- City Hospital (Multan)
- Fatima Medical And Welfare Hospital (Chak No.362/WB, Multan Dunyapur Road)
- Govt THQ Hospital Shujabad
- Khawaja Farid Social Security Hospital
- Khursheed Rafiq Hospital
- Nishtar Hospital
- Railway Hospital Multan
- Women's Christian Hospital
- Medi Care

== Muzaffargarh ==
Muzaffargarh District contains the following hospitals.

- DHQ Hospital, Muzaffargarh
- Recep Tayyip Erdogan Hospital, Muzaffargarh

== Attock ==
Hospitals in Attock District are following.

- DHQ Hospital, Attock
- THQ hospital Jand
- THQ hospital Fateh Jang
- THQ hospital Pindi Gaib

== Bahawalnagar ==
Hospitals operating in Bahawalnagar District are following.

- DHQ Hospital, Bahawalnagar

== Bahawalpur ==
The list of hospitals in Bahawalpur District is following.

- Victoria Hospital, Bahawalpur
- Bino Cancer Hospital, Bahawalpur
- Azlan Shan Bahadur Khan Hospital, Bahawalpur
- Civil Hospital, Bahawalpur
- Zubair Hospital

== Bhakkar ==
Bhakkar District contains the following hospitals

- DHQ Hospital, Bhakkar

== Chakwal ==
The list of hospitals in Chakwal District contains the following hospitals

- DHQ Hospital, Chakwal

== Chiniot ==
Hospitals operating in Chiniot District are following

- DHQ Hospital, Chiniot

== Dera Ghazi Khan ==
Dera Ghazi Khan District contains the following hospitals.

- DHQ Hospital, Dera Ghazi Khan
- Buzdar General Hospital and Infertility Clinic, Dera Ghazi Khan

== Narowal ==
Following hospitals are operating in Narowal District.

- DHQ Hospital, Narowal
- Sughra Shafi Medical Hospital Complex

== Nankana Sahib ==
Hospitals in Nankana Sahib District are following.

- DHQ Hospital, Nankana Sahib

== Okara ==
Okara District contains the following hospitals.

- DHQ Okara
- Al Madina Hospital and Maternity Home, Renala Khurd

== Pakpattan ==
Following hospitals are operating in Pakpattan District.

- DHQ Hospital, Pakpattan

== Rahim Yar Khan ==
The list of hospitals in Rahim Yar Khan District contains the following hospitals.

- DHQ Hospital, Rahim Yar Khan
- Shaikh Zayed Medical College and Hospital, Rahim Yar Khan

== Rajanpur ==
Hospitals in Rajanpur District are following.

- DHQ Hospital, Rajanpur

== Rawalpindi ==
Rawalpindi aka Pindi is the well known city of Pakistan. The list of hospitals in Rawalpindi District contains the following hospitals.

- Abdul Sattar General Hospital
- Al-Khidmat Raazi Hospital
- Al Shifa Eye Trust
- Al Shifa Hospital Chakri Road
- Attock Hospital Ltd.
- Benazir Bhutto Hospital
- Bilal Hospital
- Cantt General Hospital
- CB Hospital
- DHQ Hospital, Rawalpindi
- Fouji Foundation Hospital
- Hanif Hospital
- Heart International Hospital
- Holy Family Hospital
- Jinnah International Hospital
- Madina Medical Centre
- Maryam Memorial Hospital Bahria Town Phase 4
- Mehboob Hospital
- Nusrat Hospital
- Railway General Hospital
- Rawalpindi General Hospital
- Rawalpindi Institute of Cardiology
- Shafi International Hospital
- St Joseph’s Hospice, Rawalpindi

== Sahiwal ==
Sahiwal District contains the following hospitals.

- DHQ Hospital, Sahiwal

Shan Medicare Hospital Arifwala

== Sheikhupura ==
The list of hospitals in Sheikhupura District is following.

- Farooq Poly Clinic
- Khan Hospital
- Kishwar Fazal Hospital Sheikhupura
- Sultan Hospital Sheikhupura

== Sialkot ==
Hospitals in Sialkot District are following.

- DHQ Hospital, Sialkot
- Bethania Hospital, Sialkot

== Sargodha ==
The list of hospitals in Sargodha contains the following hospitals.

- DHQ Hospital Sargodha

== Toba Tek Singh ==
Toba Tek Singh District contains the following hospitals.

- DHQ Hospital, Toba Tek Singh

== Vehari ==
Hospitals in Vehari District are following.

- DHQ Hospital, Vehari

== Kot Addu ==
Kot Addu contains following Hospitals:

- THQ Hospital Kot Addu

== See also ==
- List of hospitals in Pakistan
