= List of hospitals in Sargodha =

This is a list of hospitals located in Sargodha, Pakistan.

DHQ Teaching Hospital is the largest hospital of Sargodha.

Mubarak Medical Complex

== Public Hospitals ==
Hospital	Type	Location
Dr Faisal Masood Teaching Hospital	Public	Mianwali Road
University Medical and Research Centre	Public	University of Sargodha
Civil Hospital	Public	Mianwali Road
Government Mian Mola Bakhsh Hospital	Public	Mianwali Road
Halal-e-Ahmar Hospital	Public	Satellite Town B-Block
Government TB hospital Sargodha	Public	Shaheenabad road Sargodha
Social security hospitals(under construction)	Public	Lahore Road
Nawaz sharif institute of cardiology (under construction)	public	Khushab road

== Military Hospitals ==
Hospital	Type	Location
Combined Military Hospital	Army	Sargodha Garrison
Fauji Foundation Hospital	Army	Satellite Town A-Block
PAF Hospital	Air Force	PAF Base Mushaf

== Private Hospitals ==
Hospital	Type	Location
Bahawal Bukhsh Medical Centre	Private	Boura Ladhiyal Sargodha
Fatima Hospital	Private	University Road
Niazi Medical Complex	Private	Club Road
Rai Medical Complex	Private	Fatima Jinnah Road
Sadiq Hospital	Private	Satellite Town A-Block
Khawaja Arshad Hospital	Private	Satellite Town A-Block
The City Hospital	Private	Main Zafrullah Road, Satellite town-C Block
Central Hospital	Private	Stadium Road
Rabia International Hospital	Private	Satellite Town A-Block
Rafiqa Medical Hospital	Private	Block no. 12, Muslim Bazar
Kazmi Hospital	Private	Satellite Town A-Block
Saba VIP Hospital	Private	Satellite Town A-Block
Sarwar Hospital	Private	Satellite Town A-Block
Tayyab Medicare Hospital	Private	Satellite Town A-Block
Tufail Hospital	Private	Pull 11, Faisalabad Road
Munir Hospital	Private	Satellite Town A-Block
Fatima Nazir Memorial Hospital	Private	University Road
Abdullah Medical Complex	Private	Stadium Road
Al-Abbas Hospital	Private	Satellite Town A-Block
Al-Rasheed Hospital	Private	Bahadur Shah Zafar Road
Bajwa Trauma Centre	Private	Stadium Road
Bhatti Medical Complex	Private	49-Tail, Faisalabad Road
Butcha Hospital	Private	Satellite Town B-block
Cheema Heart Centre	Private	Bahadur Shah Zafar Road
Ibrahim Hospital	Private	Bahadur Shah Zafar Road
Maria Khalil Hospital	Private	Muradabad
Millat Orthopaedic Complex	Private	Stadium Road
Mushtaq Medical Imaging Hospital	Private	Fatima Jinnah Road
Niazi Medical Tower	Private	Mianwali Road
National Hospital	Private	Satellite Town A-Block
Riaz Hospital	Private	49-Tail, Faisalabad Road
Shifa Hospital	Private	Mianwali Road
Shafi Hospital	Private	Satellite Town A-Block
Wajahat Hospital	Private	Satellite Town A-Block
Zaheer Laser Eye Centre	Private	Satellite Town A-Block

== See also ==
- Sargodha
- List of educational institutes in Sargodha
- List of hospitals in Pakistan
- List of hospitals in Punjab, Pakistan
- List of hospitals in Karachi
- List of hospitals in Lahore
