= Peshawar Institute of Cardiology =

Cardiac hospital in Peshawar, Pakistan

Geography
- Location: Peshawar, Khyber Pakhtunkhwa, Pakistan

Organisation
- Type: Cardiac Hospital

Services
- Standards: ISO 9001
- Emergency department: Yes
- Beds: 295

History
- Founded: 2020

Links
- Website: Official Website

Peshawar Institute of Cardiology (انسټیټیوټ قلب پشاور) is a cardiac hospital located in the Hayatabad suburb of Peshawar. It is the first cardiac hospital of Khyber Pakhtunkhwa.

== History ==
The foundation stone for Peshawar Institute of Cardiology was laid and inaugurated by Akram Khan Durrani JUI back in 2005, however construction and inauguration had faced delays due to political interference. Finally, on 16 December 2020 with a total expenditure of Rs3 billion or US$18.7 million, the hospital was officially inaugurated by the then Prime Minister Imran Khan.

In 2023, over 61,000 patients were treated at the hospital, along with 4,000 Afghan patients.

== See also ==
- Armed Forces Institute of Cardiology
- Punjab Institute of Cardiology
- Rawalpindi Institute of Cardiology
- Multan Institute of Cardiology
