= Sargodha (disambiguation) =

Sargodha may refer to:

== Places ==
- Sargodha, a city situated in Pakistan
- Sargodha District, a district of Punjab (Pakistan)
- Sargodha Tehsil, a tehsil of district Sargodha
- Sargodha Division, an administrative unit of Punjab (Pakistan)
- Sargodha Cantonment, a cantonment in Pakistan

== Education ==
- University of Sargodha, a university in Pakistan.
- not to be confused with:
  - Sargodha Medical College, a medical college in Pakistan.
  - Sargodha Institute of Technology, a technical institute in Pakistan.

== Other uses ==
- Sargodha cricket team, a local domestic cricket team.
- Sargodha Junction railway station, a railway station in Pakistan.
- Sargodha Airfield Complex, a military installation in Pakistan.

== See also ==
- Sargodar-e Kalatu, village in Iran.
