= List of educational institutes in Sargodha =

This is a list of colleges and universities located in Sargodha, Pakistan.

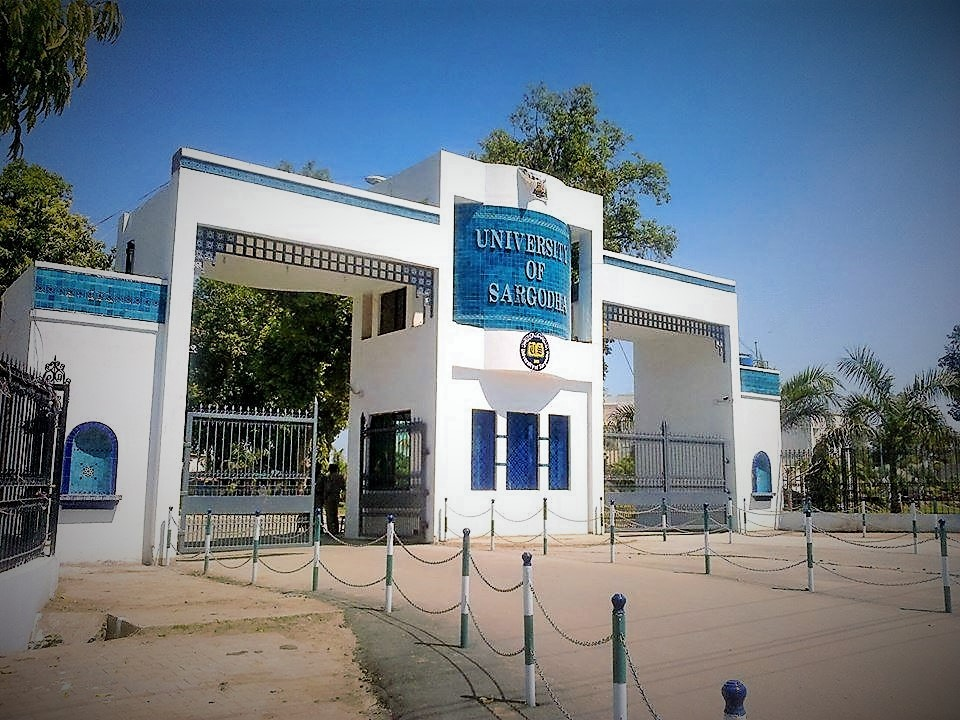
Main entrance to The University of Sargodha

== Colleges and Universities in Sargodha ==
University/College	Type	Location	Established	Website
University of Sargodha	Public	University Road	2002	
University College of Agriculture	Public	Sargodha Bypass near Jhal Chakian	2002	
University of Lahore, Sargodha Campus	Private	Lahore Road	2002	
University of Central Punjab, Sargodha Campus	Private	Lahore Road	2002	
Fortē Colleges of Excellence	Private	Satellite Town A-Block	2025	
Army Public College	Army	Mianwali Road	1975	
Cornelius Law College	Private	Fatima Jinnah Road	2015	
Quaid-e-Azam Law College	Private	Lahore Road	1998	
Punjab College of Science	Private	Khayaban-e-Sadiq (Main Campus)	1985	
The Superior College	Private	Satellite Town A-Block	2000	
Sargodha Institute of Technology		University Road	1927	
ILM College	Private	Satellite Town A-Block	2008	
Rai Medical College	Private	Bhalwal Road	2013	
Niazi Medical and Dental College	Private	Lahore Road	2017	
Airbase Inter College	Air Force	Jail Road	1981	
Fazaia Inter College	Air Force	PAF Base Mushaf	1981	
Iqra Girls College	Private	University Road	2009	
National College of Business Administration & Economics, Sargodha Campus	Private	Railway Road	2014	
The Reader College	Private	Khayaban-e-Sadiq	2016	
Government Ambala Muslim College	Public	Kot Fareed Road	1947	
Government College of Commerce	Public	Faisalabad Road	1950	
Government Postgraduate College for Women, Chandani Chowk	Public	Chandani Chowk	1962	
Government Degree College for Women, Block no. 23	Public	Block no. 23	1975	
Government College for Women, Farooq Colony	Public	Farooq Colony	1975	
Acme College of Excellence	Private	Faisalabad Road	2004	
Hira Polytechnic College	Private	Fatima Jinnah Road	2014	
Sargodha Institute of Health Sciences	Private	Satellite Town C-Block	2016	
IT Hub	Private	Stadium Road	2015	
Misali Ravian College	Private	Satellite Town A-block	2000s	
ITM College	Private	University Road	2000	
Hanif College of Accountancy	Private	Satellite Town A-block	2012	

== Schools ==
- Beaconhouse School System
- The City School
- Lahore Grammar School
- Dar-e-Arqam Schools
- PAF Public School
- Presentation Convent High School
- Army Public School and College
- Army Public School for International Studies
- Divisional Public School
- Knewton School System
- Sanai School System
- Air Base Inter School
- Fazaia Inter School
- Islamic Alta Vista High School
- Lasani Grammar High School
- St. Mary's Boys High School
- St. Doris Girls High School
- Misali Ravian School
- Central Punjab Public High School, Bhagtanwala
- Government Central Model High School
- Government High School, Johar Colony
- Government Model High School No. 1
- Government Model High School No. 2
- Government Comprehensive High School for Boys
- Government Comprehensive High School for Girls
- Government M.C High School for Girls Block no. 26 & 27
- Government High School Chak no. 47
- Government High School Sultanabad
- Government Junior Model Secondary School
- Progressive Public School
- The Right School
- Reader Grammar School
- The Wings Montessori and School
- Fatima Model School, Chak no 110 N.B
- Takbeer Model Public School
- Govt. Girls high school chak 111 SB
- Govt. Boys high school chak 111 SB
- New Iqra public school chak 111 SB
- Marhaba educational complex chak 111 SB
- Federal govt public school mela mandi road Sargodha
