= Sargodha Medical College =

College in Punjab, Pakistan

- سرگودھا طبی کالج
- Other names: SMC
- Motto: اطلبوا العلم من المهد إلی اللحد
- Motto in English: Seek knowledge from cradle to the grave
- Type: Public sector/ Government college
- Established: 2006
- Academic affiliations: College of Physicians and Surgeons Pakistan; Pakistan Medical and Dental Council University of Health Sciences, Lahore; International Medical Education Directory
- Principal: Prof. Dr. Muhammad Waris Farooka
- Academic staff: 81
- Administrative staff: 140
- Students: Total 560, 120 per annum (MBBS)
- Undergraduates: 560
- Postgraduates: 150
- Location: Sargodha, Punjab, Pakistan
- Campus: 108 acres (44 ha)
- Colors: Navy, white, silver (uniform first two years), (No Uniform for MBBS Students)
- Mascot: Smcians

Sargodha Medical College (Urdu: سرگودھا طبی کالج or SMC) is a public sector medical college located in Sargodha, Punjab, Pakistan.

It remained a constituent college of University of Sargodha till 31 December 2021, when the cabinet committee through its executive orders decided that the specialized healthcare and medical education department of the government of the punjab would take control. It was further directed by the government of Punjab that during the transition period (January to June 2022) University of Sargodha would manage the finances of the college. It offers undergraduate academic degree of MBBS in affiliation with University of Health Sciences (Lahore) and postgraduate training programs of Fellow of College of Physicians and Surgeons Pakistan and member of College of Physicians and Surgeons Pakistan in affiliation with College of Physicians and Surgeons Pakistan. In January 2023, University of Health Sciences, Lahore affiliated sargodha medical college to Faisalabad Medical University for an indefinite period of time. In May 2023, Specialized Healthcare and Medical Education Department affiliated Sargodha Medical College with University of Health Sciences, Lahore.

== History ==
The Sargodha medical college was established in 2006 as the constituent college of University of Sargodha. It is the only public sector medical school in Sargodha. For a first few years, the classes were arranged in different university lecture halls and a block of university was named after the college to temporarily accommodate the college and its administration till its own building was completed.

The institute's academic building was completed in 2011 and inaugurated by the then Prime Minister of Pakistan, Yousaf Raza Gillani. The district headquarters hospital in Sargodha was attached as the teaching hospital of this college and upgraded it to the tertiary care level. The college operates under the administrative control Faisalabad Medical University.

== Recognition and affiliation ==
- Affiliated with the University of Health Sciences, Lahore.
- It is recognised and is listed among the colleges in International Medical Education Directory.
- It is accredited by the Pakistan Medical and Dental Council.

== Departments ==
A number of departments are working in collaboration to help the college reach zenith. Some of these departments (Basic Sciences) are based at college while others (Clinical Departments) are based at Dr. Faisal Masood Teaching Hospital, Sargodha.

=== Basic Sciences ===
- Anatomy
- Physiology
- Biochemistry
- Forensic Medicine
- Pathology
- Pharmacology
- Community Medicine
- Histology
- Embryology

=== Surgery & Allied Departments ===
- Anesthesiology
- Cardiac Surgery
- Neurosurgery
- Obstetrics and Gynaecology
- Ophthalmology
- Oral and Maxillofacial Surgery
- Orthopedics
- Otorhinolaryngology
- Pediatric Surgery
- Plastic Surgery
- Radiology
- General Surgery Unit I, II, III.
- Thoracic Surgery
- Urology
- Nephrology

=== Medicine & Allied Departments ===
- Cardiology
- Tuberculosis and Chest Medicine
- Clinical Oncology (Radiotherapy)
- Dermatology
- Neurology
- Pediatrics
- General Medicine Unit 1 & 2
- Psychiatry and Behavioural Sciences

=== Attached Hospitals ===
- Dr. Faisal Masood Teaching Hospital Sargodha
- Government Maula Baksh Hospital Sargodha

== Programs Offered ==
=== Undergraduate ===
- Bachelor of Medicine, Bachelor of Surgery (MBBS)

=== Postgraduate ===
- Doctor of Philosophy (Ph.D)
- Doctor of Medicine (MD)
- Master of Surgery (MS)
- Fellow of College of Physicians and Surgeons Pakistan (FCPS)
- Member of College of Physicians & Surgeons Pakistan (MCPS)
- Master of Philosophy (M.Phil.)

== See also ==
- College of Physicians and Surgeons Pakistan
- Pakistan Medical and Dental Council
- University of Sargodha
- University of Health Sciences, Lahore
- List of hospitals in Sargodha
