= Pirhossein Kolivand =

Iranian physician, politician and executive (born 1971)

- پیرحسین کولیوند
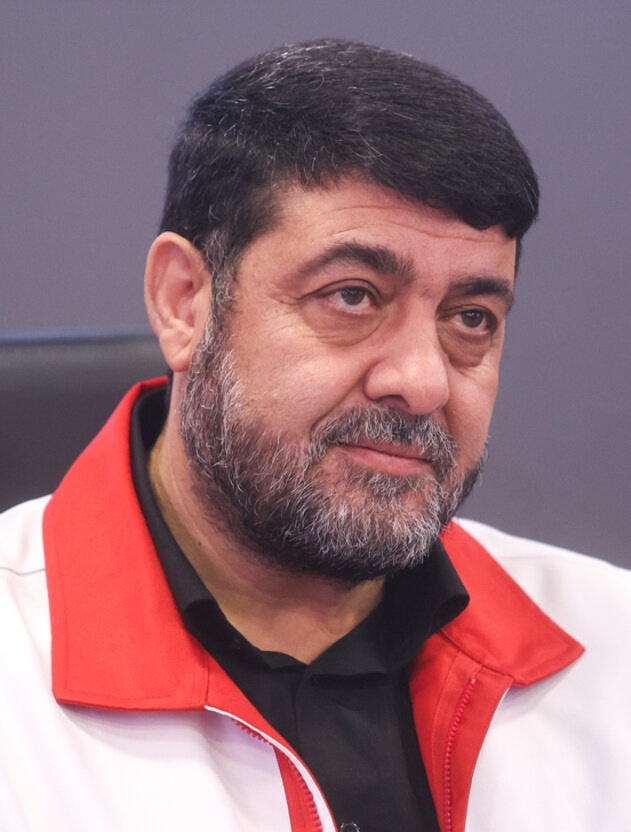
- Kolivand in 2026

Head of the Iranian Red Crescent Society
- Incumbent
- Assumed office 21 November 2021
- President: Ebrahim Raisi; Mohammad Mokhber (acting); Masoud Pezeshkian
- Preceded by: Karim Hemmati

Personal details
- Born: January 1, 1971 (age 55) Tuyserkan, Hamadan Province, Iran
- Education: Associate degree in Anesthesia, Hamadan University of Medical Sciences; Ph.D. in Organizational Management; Master's degree in Hospital Management

Pirhossein Kolivand (Persian: پیرحسین کولیوند, born 1971) is an Iranian physician, politician, and senior executive. He currently serves as the head of the Iranian Red Crescent Society. His career includes notable positions such as the head of the National Emergency and Disaster Management Organization, head of the Relief and Rescue Organization, and head of Emergency Services. He was also the former manager of Khatam Al-Anbia Hospital. Kolivand was born in the city of Tuyserkan.

== Background ==
Pirhossein Kolivand was admitted to the associate degree program in Anesthesia at Hamadan University of Medical Sciences in 1989 and graduated in 1991. He also holds bachelor's and master's degrees in hospital management and a PhD in organizational behavior management. Kolivand is a faculty member at Shahed University and the author of over 60 books and numerous articles.

After completing his associate degree, Kolivand worked in Tuyserkan and Hamadan until 1995 and subsequently began his career at Khatam al-Anbia Hospital. He completed a course in cardiopulmonary bypass at Iran University of Medical Sciences and was among the first to receive certification as a Cardioperfusionist from the university.

In August 2016, Kolivand was appointed head of the National Emergency Medical Services (EMS) by the former Minister of Health, Hassan Ghazizadeh Hashemi. During his tenure, he proposed the establishment of the EMS organization. One of the significant crises during his leadership was the Mina tragedy. During the presidency of Ebrahim Raisi, Kolivand was appointed as the head of the Iranian Red Crescent Society for four years.

== Iranian Red Crescent Society ==
Pirhossein Kolivand was introduced to the President as the top candidate for the leadership of the Iranian Red Crescent Society after receiving 13 votes from the High Council members.

Some of his notable initiatives during his tenure include forming advance teams, equipping the Integrated Management Room and Emergency Operations Center (EOC) for crisis intervention, and establishing rapid response teams, monitoring teams, reporting teams, support teams, and second-response teams.
