= Sargodha Hockey Stadium =

Stadium in Pakistan

Sargodha Astroturf Hockey Stadium
- سرگودھا آسٹروٹرف ہاکی سٹیڈیم
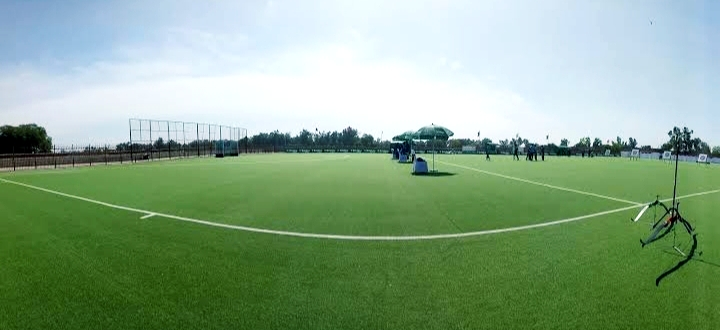
- Interactive map of Sargodha Astroturf Hockey Stadium
- Location: Sargodha, Punjab, Pakistan
- Coordinates: 32.067146897404726°N 72.65745076416255°E
- Owner: Government of Pakistan
- Surface: AstroTurf

Construction
- Opened: 11 March 2013; 13 years ago

Sargodha Astroturf Hockey Stadium is a field hockey stadium located in Sargodha, Punjab, Pakistan. It is primarily used for hosting hockey matches. It was inaugurated on 11 March 2013 by then Minister of State for Water and Power Tasneem Ahmed Qureshi.

Sargodha Hockey Stadium is home to Sargodha District Hockey Team and provides a reliable platform for youngsters. The stadium is located at a walking distance from the renowned Mela Mandi Ground.

== Tournaments ==
=== All Punjab Archery Championship 2019 ===
All Punjab Archery Championship 2019 was held in Sargodha Astroturf Hockey Stadium. This championship was won by the team of Faisalabad Division. Sargodha Division team secured second position in the event. This event was organized by the Punjab Sports department. Then Commissioner of Sargodha Division, Zafar Iqbal was chief guest who gave away prizes among the players.

=== All Punjab Archery Championship 2020 ===
All Punjab Archery Championship 2020 was held in Sargodha Astroturf Hockey Stadium in August 2020.

=== All Pakistan Benazir Shaheed Hockey Tournament ===
All Pakistan Benazir Shaheed Hockey Tournament 2013 was held in Sargodha Astroturf Hockey Stadium.

== Trials ==
Every year, trials are held at Sargodha Astroturf Hockey Stadium for the selection of district hockey team. The selected candidates are also able to participate in Inter District Hockey tournament.

== See also ==
- Sargodha Cricket Stadium
- Mela Mandi Ground
