= Mela Mandi Ground =

Multi-use stadium in Punjab, Pakistan

- Location: Sargodha, Punjab, Pakistan
- Owner: Government of Pakistan
- Surface: Grassy and dusty

Construction
- Opened: 1952

Mela Mandi Ground is a multi-use historic stadium in Sargodha, in Pakistan's Punjab province. It is currently used mostly for hosting cricket and football matches. It is located at a walking distance from Sargodha Astroturf Hockey Stadium. The Mela Mandi Ground was constructed to provide a vast ground for outdoor sports and activities. In March every year, which is the spring season in Pakistan's Punjab plains, several competitions are held here, with large participation of the masses.

== See also ==
- Sargodha Cricket Stadium
- List of stadiums in Pakistan
- List of cricket grounds in Pakistan
