= Iranian Red Crescent Society =

Non-governmental organization based in Iran

Red Crescent Society of the Islamic Republic of Iran
- جمعیت هلال احمر جمهوری اسلامی ایران
- Abbreviation: IRCS
- Formation: 1922; 104 years ago
- Founder: Amir Amir-Aʿlam
- Type: NGO
- Legal status: Legislated by the Iranian Parliament on 28 April 1988
- Purpose: Humanitarian aid
- Headquarters: Building of Peace, 136 Valiasr Street, Tehran
- Region served: Iran
- Services: Relief operations; Search and rescue; Education; Research
- Fields: Pharmaceutical industry; Textile manufacturing; Healthcare
- Secretary General: Dr. Yaghob Soleymani
- President: Pirhossein Kolivand
- Budget: $231.36 million (2016–17)
- Staff: 7,000 paid employees (2005)
- Volunteers: 2,000,000 (2017)
- Website: rcs.ir
- Formerly called: Red Lion and Sun Society

The Iranian Red Crescent Society (IRCS), officially the Red Crescent Society of the Islamic Republic of Iran (RCSIRI) (Persian: جمعیت هلال احمر جمهوری اسلامی ایران, romanized: Jamʿiyyat-e Helâl-e Ahmar-e Jomhuri-ye Eslâmi-ye Irân) is a non-governmental humanitarian organization in Iran. Founded as the Red Lion and Sun Society in 1922, it became affiliated with the International Federation of Red Cross and Red Crescent Societies (IFRC) in 1924 and changed its name and emblem in 1980, informing the international community of Hilal Ahmar adoption while assuming the right to adopt the former emblem in future.

The society is one of the world's largest national societies within IFRC and is noted for its special expertise in responding to earthquakes.

Since inception, the IRCS has participated in a variety of public activities. Its core activity is to perform relief and rescue operations to help victims and the injured in natural disasters and accidents. It also engages a in wide range of humanitarian services in health and rehabilitation, training and research. The society had a therapeutic approach and was regarded a major healthcare institution with thousands of hospital beds across the country until 1979, when all of its medical facilities were transferred to the Ministry of Health.

IRCS is an example of strong national societies that play an important role domestically and is held in high esteem by the Iranian general public.

== Organization ==
Emblem formerly used for the Red Lion and Sun Society

IRCS has 30 governorate headquarters, one in each province of Iran, and 330 branches throughout the country, as of 2005. Based on the latest structure, it is made up of four departments: relief and rescue (emdād wa najāt), medical provisions (tadārokāt-e pezeški), volunteers (dāvṭalabān), and youth (javānān). The latter is largely made up of high school and university student members.

According to the law enacted by the Iranian Parliament, the society is run by a chairman appointed by the President of Iran. This procedure is in contrast with the elective nature of a society chairman as suggested by the IFRC. The secretary general is responsible for the administrative and executive affairs.

=== Other subordinates ===
IRCS owns and runs Helal Iran Textile Industries Co., a producer of blankets and tents. SOHA, a manufacturer of disposable medical devices is also owned by the society, as well as Shahrvand, a daily newspaper. The Iranian Red Crescent Medical Journal, an English language peer-reviewed journal on clinical and scientific medicine, is another publication of IRCS.

== Presidents ==
Heads of the society have been:

- 1922–1949: Amir Amir-A'lam (deputy director)
  - 1922–1925: Mohammad Hassan Mirza (honorary)
  - 1927–1931: Mostowfi ol-Mamalek (chairman)
  - 1931–1941: Reza Pahlavi (symbolic)
  - 1941–1949: Mohammad Reza Pahlavi
- 1949–1979: Hossein Khatibi Nouri (managing director)
  - 1949–1979: Shams Pahlavi (chairwoman)
- 1979–1980: Kazem Sami
- 1980–1981: Ali Behzadnia
- 1981–1983: Hassan Firouzabadi
- 1983–1999: Seifollah Vahid Dastjerdi
- 1999–2006: Ahmad-Ali Nourbala
- 2006–2010: Masoud Khatami
- 2010–2013: Abolhassan Faqih
- 2013–2014: Mohammad Farhadi
- 2014–2017: Amir-Mohsen Ziayi
- 2017–2019: Ali Asqar Peyvandi
- 2020–2021: Karim Hemmati
- 2021–present: Pirhossein Kolivand
