= Khawaja Farid Social Security Hospital =

Khawaja Fareed Social Security Hospital Multan
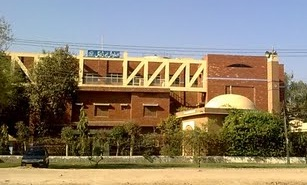

Geography
- Location: Multan, Pakistan
- Coordinates: 30°17′N 71°49′E

Organisation
- Type: Teaching

History
- Opened: 1967

Links
- Website: www.pessi.gop.pk/Hospitals.html
- Lists: Hospitals in Pakistan

Khawaja Farid Social Security Hospital is a 100 bed public hospital in Multan. It was established in 1967.

== Hospital departments ==
Its medical care departments are:

- Cardiology
- Critical Care
- Dentistry
- Dermatology
- Ear Nose and Throat
- Gynecology
- Nephrology
- Ophthalmology
- Pathology
- Psychiatry
- Demonology
- Radiology
- Hematology
- Surgery
- Urology
