= Rawalpindi Institute of Cardiology =

- Government of Pakistan

Geography
- Location: Rawalpindi, Punjab, Pakistan
- Coordinates: 33°36′56″N 73°04′54″E

Organisation
- Care system: Public/Government
- Type: Specialist
- Affiliated university: College of Physicians & Surgeons of Pakistan

Services
- Emergency department: I
- Beds: 272
- Speciality: Cardiology

History
- Constructed: June 2010
- Founded: September 2012

Links
- Website: www.ric.gop.pk
- Lists: Hospitals in Pakistan

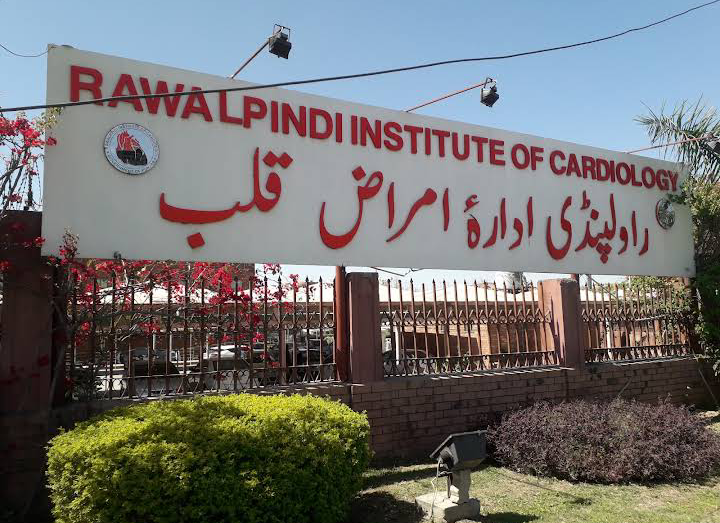
Rawalpindi Institute of Cardiology

Rawalpindi Institute of Cardiology (RIC) is a non-profit tertiary level cardiac hospital located on Rawal Road in Rawalpindi, of the Punjab province of Pakistan. Established in 2012, RIC has nearly 50 departments which provide health facilities to several parts of the country. The hospital was established by Punjab Health Department and inaugurated by former Chief Minister of the Punjab, Shahbaz Sharif. A 272-bed hospital, the current executive director is Professor Dr. Musfireh Siddiqeh, a Cardiac Surgeon. The Medical Superintendent of the hospital is Dr. Qurban Hussain Khan, a Cardiac Electrophysiologist. In May 2026, Rawalpindi Institute of Cardiology received ISO certification for its healthcare quality management systems and institutional processes.

== History ==
In October 2005, the establishment of Rawalpindi Institute of Cardiology (RIC) was approved by the CM Punjab Chaudhry Parvez Elahi government of the Punjab. At the cost of Rs.2.75 billion, the construction was started in June 2010. The then-Chief Minister of Punjab, Shahbaz Sharif, said that the project would be completed within a year, although shortage of funds meant that this timescale was not met. According to Hanif Abbasi – a former Pakistan Muslim League-N Member of the National Assembly – the provincial government provided Rs.100 million for the project. The Chief Minister then announced that RIC would be inaugurated by 14 August 2012, but once again the deadline was missed due to the delay in installation of the equipment. Medical Superintendent of the RIC Dr. Shoaib Khan told "that the project had not been delayed but the health department had delayed the inauguration function due to Ramazan and some important engagements of the chief minister."

== Departments and staff ==
RIC started functioning from September 2012 with the help of Rawalpindi Medical College's (RMC) administration, treating 21 patients in the outpatient department (OPD). Shahbaz Sharif inaugurated the hospital officially on 15 September. RIC is the first hospital in Rawalpindi Division which consists of modern 48-beds emergency department, 26 medical ventilators and five CT angiography machines. The hospital also includes 24-beds Intensive Care Unit (ICU), 14-beds Coronary care unit (CCU) and four operation theatres (OT). A free of cost state of the art centre for cardiac surgery, paediatric cardiology and surgery, angiography and radiology will treat the patients of Potohar region, northern areas and Azad Jammu and Kashmir. RIC started emergency services in February 2013.

Provincial government created 285 posts for RIC which include 60 doctors (50 specialists available 24 hours), 90 nurses, 40 paramedical staff and 95 technicians. Dr. Shoaib Khan was the first Medical Superintendent (MS) who left the institute in July 2013 while Dr. Qais Mahmood Sikander joined as new MS., In September 2025, Dr Qurban Hussain Khan, an Associate Professor of Cardiac Electrophysiology, was given additional charge as Medical Superintendent.

== See also ==
- List of hospitals in Pakistan
- Multan Institute of Cardiology
- Punjab Institute of Cardiology
