= Multan Institute of Cardiology =

Coordinates: 30°11′30″N 71°27′01″E

- Government of Punjab

Geography
- Location: Multan, South Punjab, Punjab, Pakistan

Organisation
- Care system: Public/Government
- Type: Cardiology
- Affiliated university: College of Physicians & Surgeons of Pakistan

Services
- Emergency department: 24/7 Emergency Services
- Beds: 279

Links
- Website: www.cpeic.gop.pk
- Lists: Hospitals in Pakistan
- Other links: List of hospitals in Pakistan

Multan Institute of Cardiology (MIC), is a hospital located in Multan city in Pakistan. It was established by Chaudhry Pervaiz Elahi, the former chief minister of Punjab province, in 2005.

== Infrastructure ==
CPE Institute of Cardiology Multan is a tertiary care hospital providing comprehensive services of cardiology and cardiac surgery for both adult and congenital heart diseases. It has one of the largest Modular Operation Theater suites in the country. There are five operating rooms with dedicated preparation and scrub areas. The construction of this modular theater complex was completed in 2009 and the first surgery in the new complex was performed in March 2009.

== See also ==
- List of hospitals in Pakistan
- Rawalpindi Institute of Cardiology
- Punjab Institute of Cardiology
