= Hilal Ahmar =

Organization in the International Red Cross

- Named after: Islamic crescent as based on the flag of the Ottoman Empire
- Formation: 1906; 120 years ago
- Founded at: Anatolia, Ottoman Empire
- Type: Humanitarian non-profit
- Origins: Anatolia
- Region served: Islamic world
- Parent organization: International Red Cross and Red Crescent Movement

Hilal Ahmar (Arabic: الهلال الأحمر, Persian: هلال احمر, Turkish: Hilâl-i Ahmer,Urdu: ہلالِ احمر) (Note: Meaning Red Crescent in English) is a charitable organization, part of the International Red Cross and Red Crescent Movement. Hilal Ahmar is a humanitarian non-profit organization that provides emergency assistance, disaster relief, and disaster preparedness in several Islamic countries. The name 'Red Crescent' was internationally recognized in 1906 at the request of the Ottoman Empire.

== History ==
=== The First Red Crescent Societies in the Ottoman Empire ===
The Ottoman Empire established the first Red Cross Society in the Muslim world in 1869. However, this was a Geneva committee effort rather than a national one. They had succeeded in persuading Dr. Abdullah Bey (1801-1874), an Austrian-born Ottoman surgeon, to establish a Red Cross Society in Istanbul at a medical symposium in Paris. There were a lot of Christians on the first Ottoman committee. Prior to the Balkan and Tripoli Wars, it was little active.

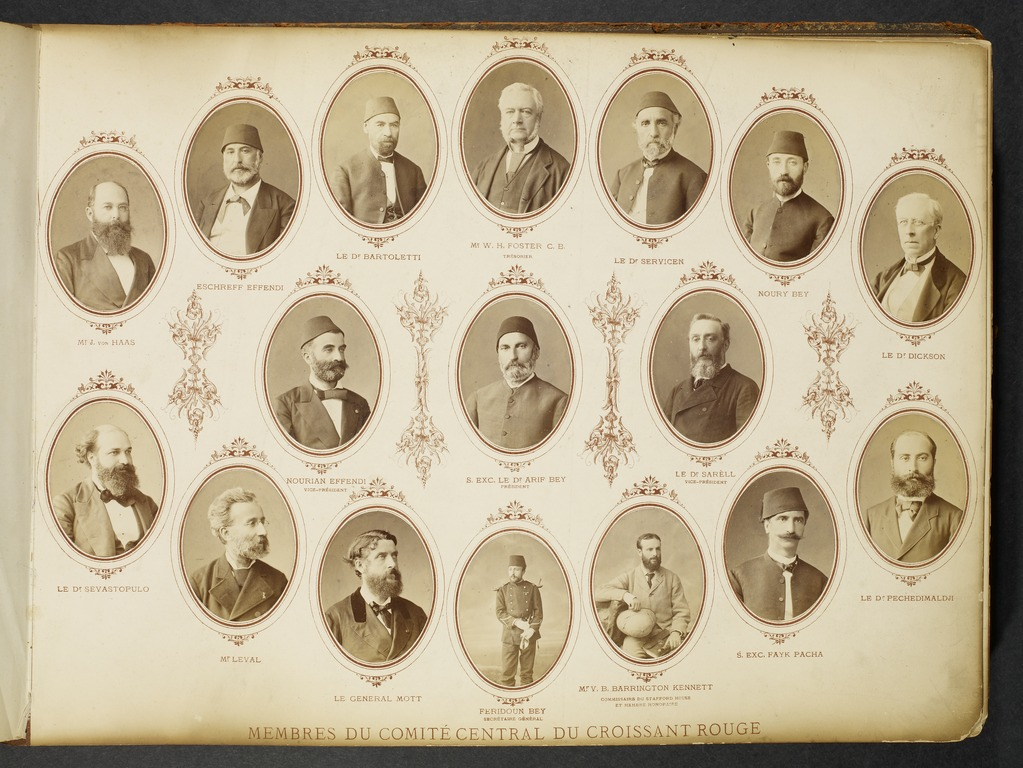
Turkish Red Crescent Members

The emergence of the Young Turks led to the gradual appropriation of Turkish society for nationalist protests and official sponsorship. In fact, the majority of its members were affiliated with the state, and many of its prominent members had earned degrees from the Military Medical School, one of the Young Turk Movement's original hubs. Humanitarian and patriotic reasons were more important to the surgeons who took part in medical missions than religious ones.

Women were essential to this organization because it supported their emancipation aspirations and allowed the government to show that it cared about women's rights.

Its name was later changed to "Hilal-i Ahmar Society of Turkey" before finally becoming "Kızılay Society of Turkey." The name "Kızılay" was bestowed by the Turkish leader, Atatürk. Notably, Kızılay was one of the few organizations that the nascent Turkish Republic inherited from the Ottoman Empire.

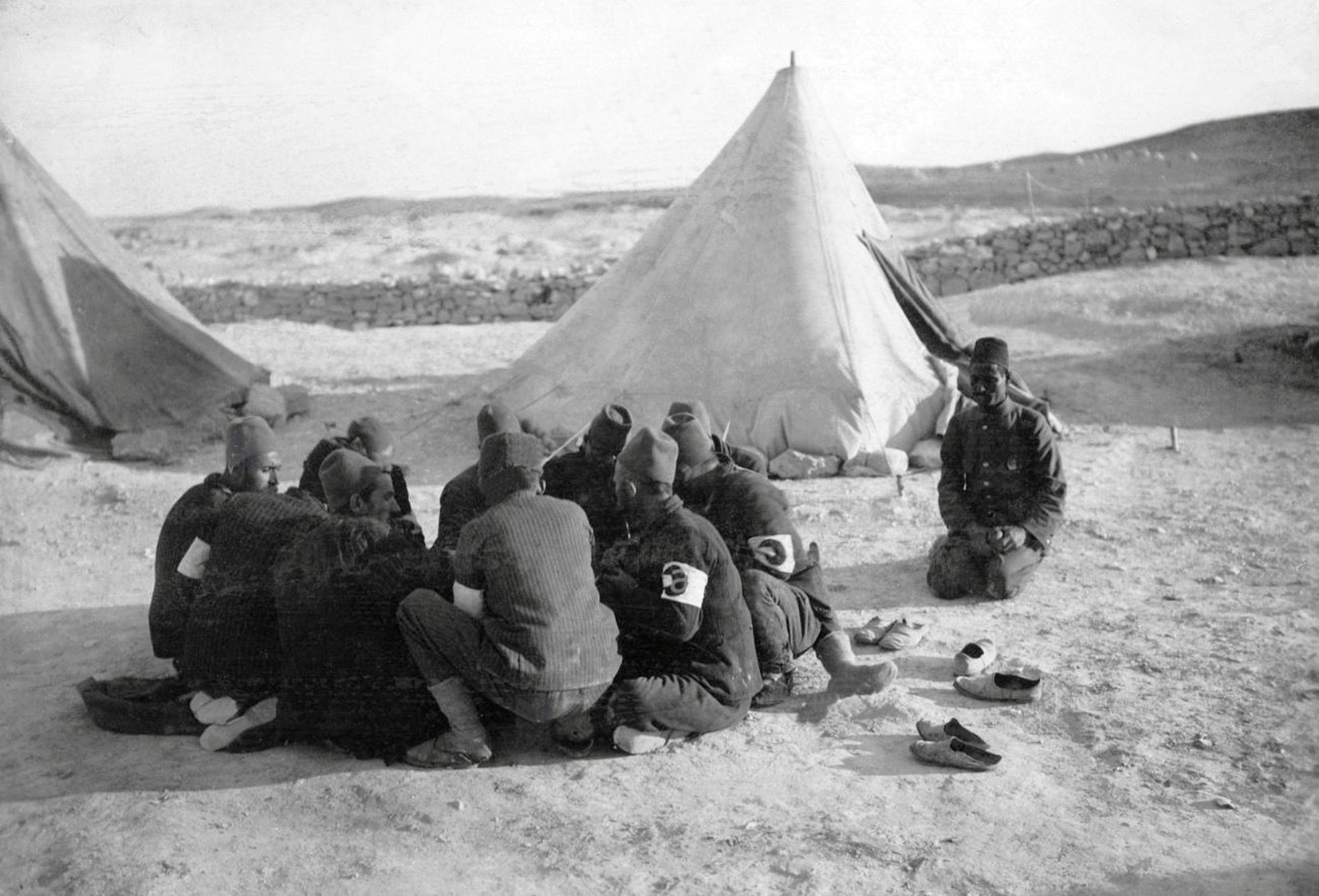
Ottoman Hilal Ahmar staff (1915)

The Hilal e Ahmar was renamed the Kızılay Derneği in Turkey in 1935. Red Crescent society in Pakistan is still called Anjuman e Hilal e Ahmar Pakistan. It was founded on December 20, 1947, by the founder of Pakistan, Muhammad Ali Jinnah.

== See also ==
- List of Red Cross and Red Crescent Societies
- Turkish Red Crescent
- Pakistan Red Crescent Society
- Iranian Red Crescent Society
- Algerian Red Crescent Society
- Saudi Arabian Red Crescent Society
- Syrian Arab Red Crescent
