= Sargodha =

City in Punjab, Pakistan

Sargodha سرگودھا
- Metropolis
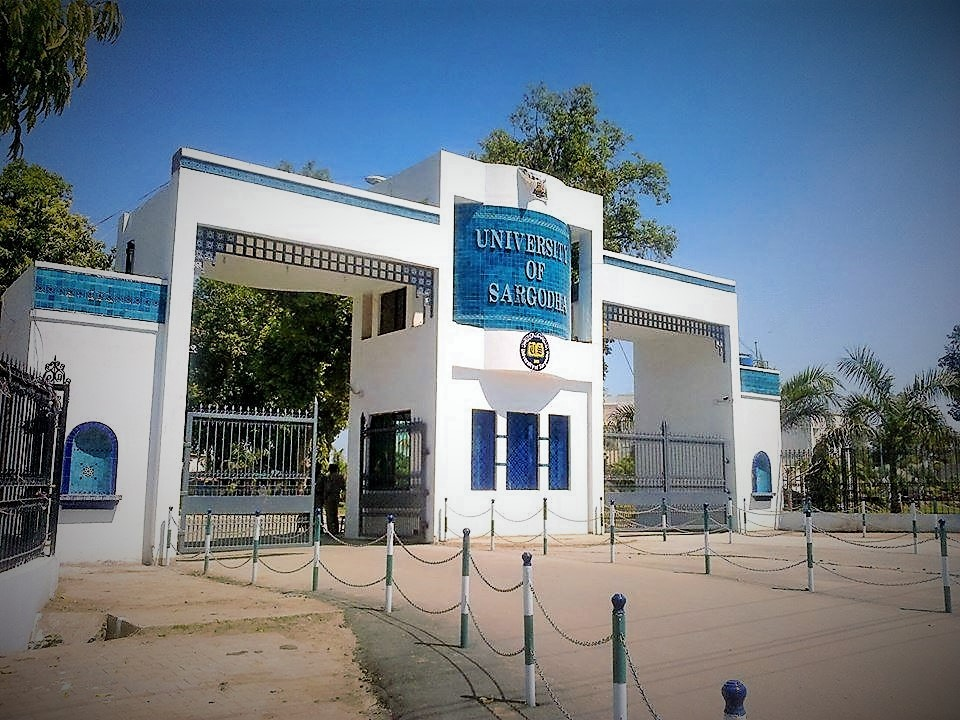
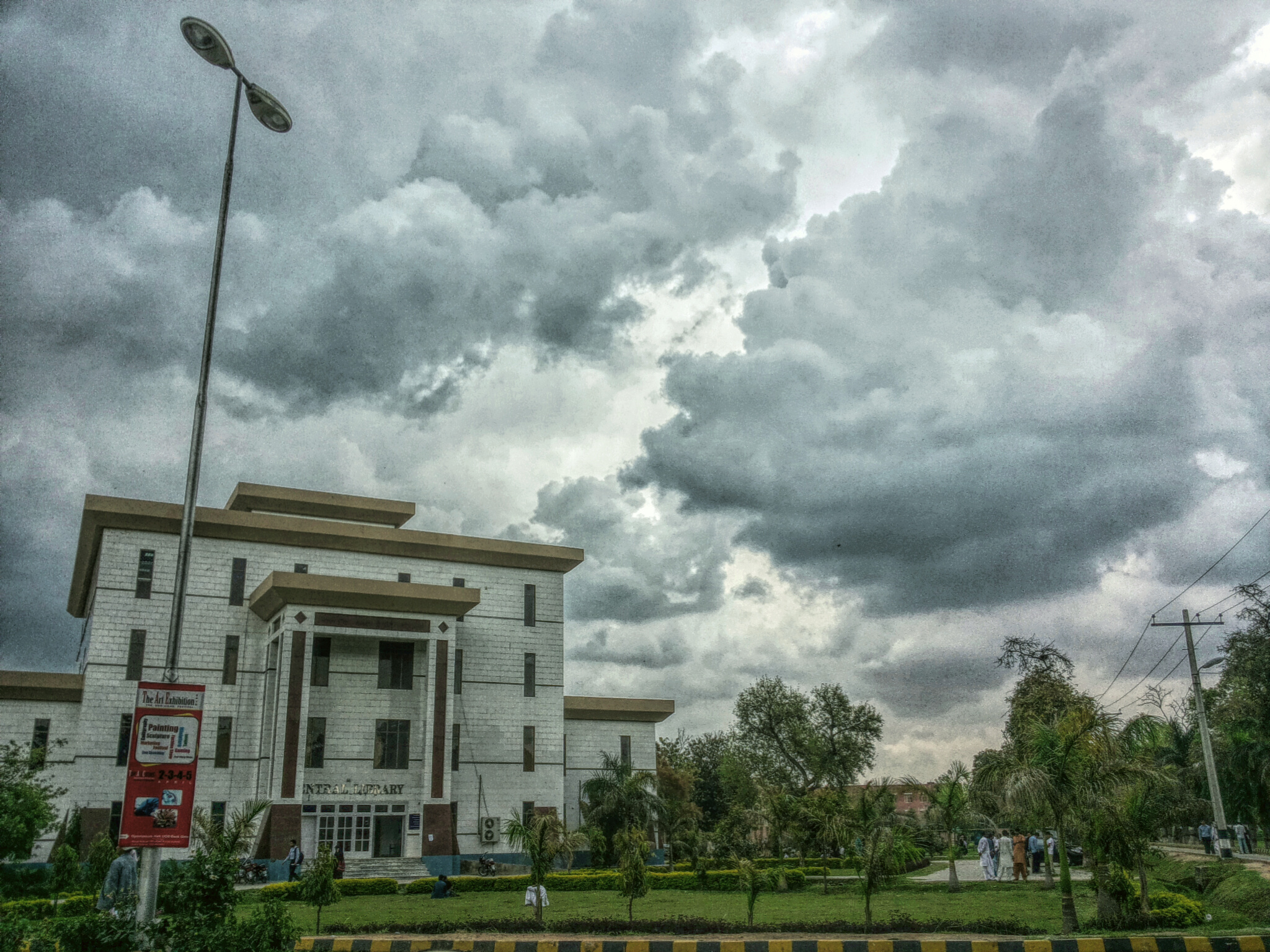
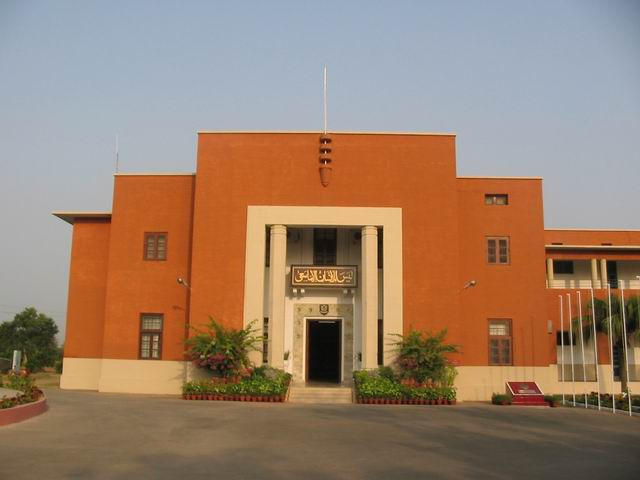
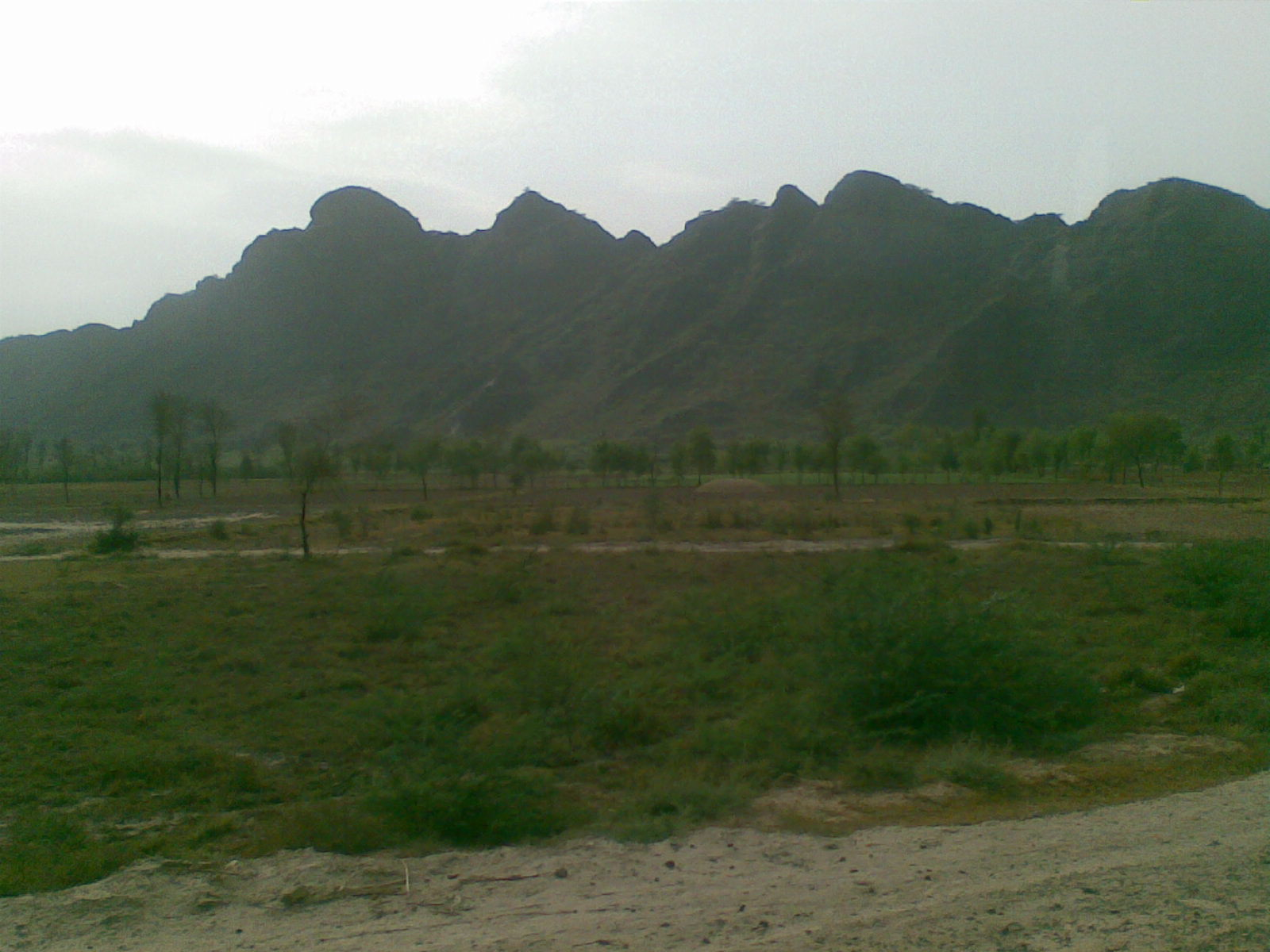
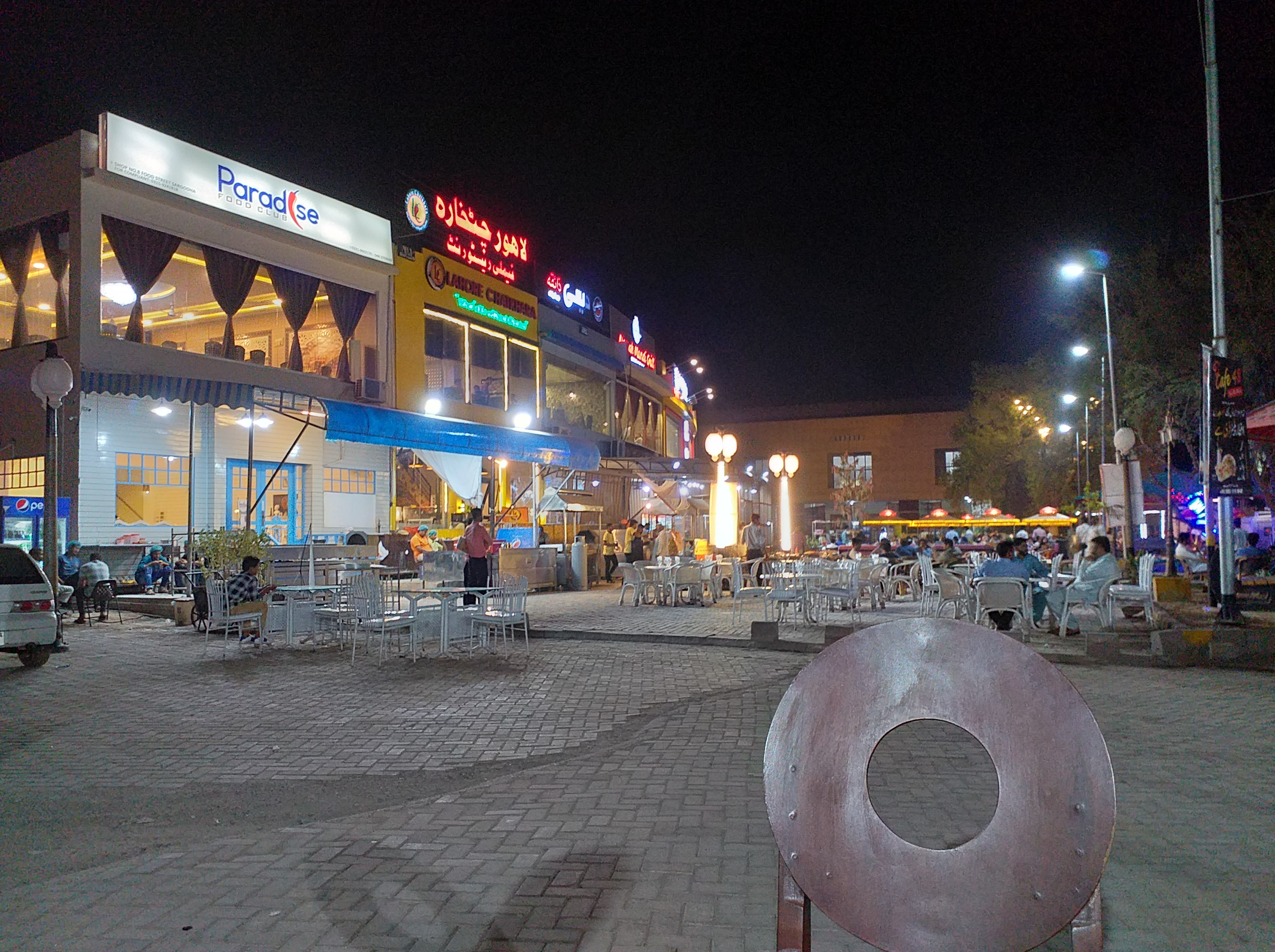
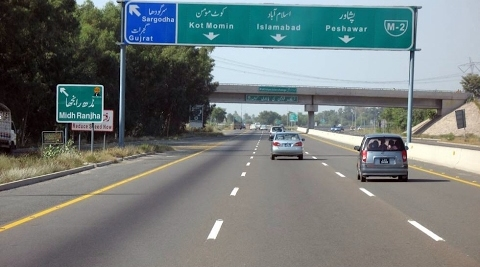
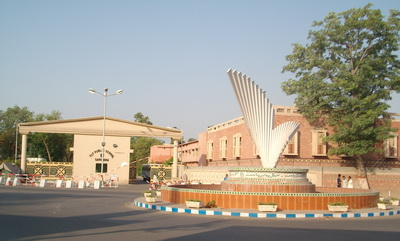
- Shaheen Enclave University of Sargodha Central Library PAF Public School Kirana Hills Food Street M-2 Exit Mushaf Ali Mir Chowk

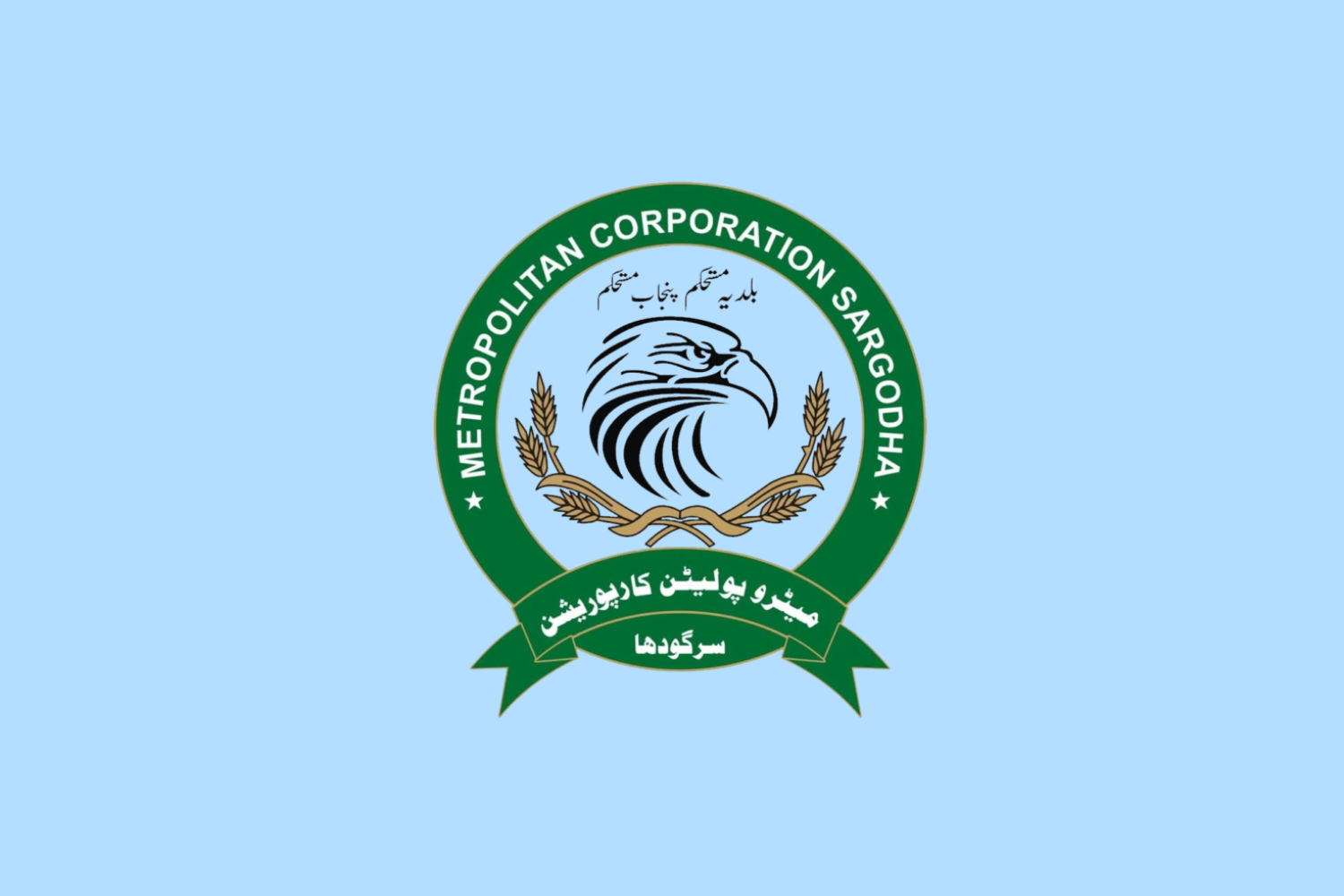
- Flag
- Nicknames: City of Eagles, California of Pakistan
- Location of Sargodha Sargodha (Pakistan) Sargodha (Asia)
- Coordinates: 32°5′1″N 72°40′16″E
- Country: Pakistan
- Province: (Punjab, Pakistan) Punjab
- Division: Sargodha
- District: Sargodha
- Founded: 22 February 1903; 123 years ago

Government
  - Type: Municipal Corporation
  - Body: Metropolitan Corporation Sargodha
  - Mayor: Vacant
  - Administrator: Muhammad Jahanzeb Awan (BPS-20 PAS)

Area
  - City: 155 km^{2} (60 sq mi)
- Elevation: 190 m (620 ft)

Population (2023)
  - City: 975,886
  - Rank: 6th, Punjab; 11th, Pakistan
  - Density: 6,300/km^{2} (16,300/sq mi)
  - Demonym: Sargodhian
- Time zone: UTC+5 (PKT)
- Postal code: 40100
- Dialling code: 048
- Number of union councils: 60
- Number of towns: 59
- Website: sargodha.punjab.gov.pk

Sargodha (Note: /sɑːˈɡəʊdə/; سرگودھا; Punjabi: [sɐɾˈɡoː˦d̪ˑäː]; Urdu: [ˈsəɾˌɡoːˈd̪ʱɑː]) is the sixth-largest city in the Pakistani province of Punjab. Located along the Kirana Hills in central Punjab, it serves as the headquarters of its eponymous district and division. Sargodha is the 11th-most populous city in Pakistan, being one of the fastest-growing cities of the country. It is also known as the City of Eagles.

It is one of the few planned cities of Pakistan (others include Faisalabad, Islamabad and Gwadar).

== History ==
Sargodha was established by the British as a canal-colony in 1903 (originally spelled Sargoda) as a tehsil of Shahpur district. Sargodha was badly affected by an outbreak of the bubonic plague in 1903, and experienced a milder outbreak in 1904. Although it was a small town in the beginning, the British Royal Air Force built an airport there due to its strategic location. The term "Sargodha" has its origin in the words "Sar" (from "sarowar") meaning "pond" and "Godha" meaning "Sadhu", which means "Pond of Godha". The city was founded by Lady Trooper by the supervision of Sir Charles Montgomery Rivaz KCSI (1845 – 7 October 1926), a colonial administrator in British India and Lieutenant-Governor of the Punjab from 1902 to 1907. Being the District Headquarters since 1940, Sargodha was given the status of Divisional Headquarters in 1960.

== Geography ==
=== Location ===
Location and distance of Sargodha with respect to five major cities of Pakistan is as follow:

- 1,202 km (747 mi) north of Karachi
- 187 km (116 mi) west of Lahore
- 241 km (150 mi) south of Islamabad
- 91 km (57 mi) north-west of Faisalabad
- 223 km (139 mi) south of Rawalpindi

Sargodha is situated in Pakistani province of Punjab. It is located 187 kilometres (116 mi) northwest of Lahore, in Sargodha District. It lies about 48 kilometres (30 miles) from the M-2 motorway, which connects Lahore and Islamabad. It is connected to the M-2 by several interchanges at different locations. Sargodha is roughly 91 km (57 mi) from Faisalabad, due southeast. Directly east connected by the M-2 motorway are Lahore and the route to Rawalpindi and Islamabad. Due east is the city of Jhang; toward the west are the city of Mianwali and the Chashma Barrage.

=== Topography ===
Sargodha mainly comprises flat, fertile plains, although here are a few small hills along the Sargodha-Faisalabad Road. The River Jhelum flows on the western and northern sides, and the River Chenab on the eastern side of the city. The city is located 190 metres above sea level.

=== Climate ===
The city has a climate of extreme heat in the summers and moderate cold in the winters. The maximum temperature reaches 50 °C (122 °F) in the summer while the minimum temperature recorded is as low as freezing point in the winter.

Climate data for Sarghoda (1991–2020)
Month	Jan	Feb	Mar	Apr	May	Jun	Jul	Aug	Sep	Oct	Nov	Dec	Year
Mean daily maximum °C (°F)	18.6 (65.5)	22.4 (72.3)	27.6 (81.7)	34.1 (93.4)	39.6 (103.3)	40.7 (105.3)	37.7 (99.9)	36.6 (97.9)	35.7 (96.3)	32.8 (91.0)	26.9 (80.4)	21.6 (70.9)	31.2 (88.2)
Daily mean °C (°F)	11.8 (53.2)	15.2 (59.4)	20.6 (69.1)	26.7 (80.1)	32.0 (89.6)	34.0 (93.2)	32.7 (90.9)	31.9 (89.4)	30.2 (86.4)	25.4 (77.7)	19.2 (66.6)	14.0 (57.2)	24.5 (76.1)
Mean daily minimum °C (°F)	4.9 (40.8)	8.2 (46.8)	13.7 (56.7)	19.4 (66.9)	24.5 (76.1)	27.2 (81.0)	27.7 (81.9)	27.2 (81.0)	24.8 (76.6)	18.7 (65.7)	11.5 (52.7)	6.2 (43.2)	17.8 (64.0)
Average precipitation mm (inches)	18.9 (0.74)	28.3 (1.11)	38.5 (1.52)	37.2 (1.46)	28.9 (1.14)	56.1 (2.21)	131.6 (5.18)	94.1 (3.70)	56.1 (2.21)	12.1 (0.48)	4.6 (0.18)	8.9 (0.35)	515.3 (20.29)
Average precipitation days (≥ 1.0 mm)	2.9	3.9	4.5	4.5	3.7	4.6	6.7	5.4	3.8	1.5	0.8	1.0	43.3
Average relative humidity (%)	68	62	60	49	40	43	62	67	61	56	65	70	59
Source 1: NOAA
Source 2: Deutscher Wetterdienst (humidity 1979-1995)

== Demographics ==
Population

Historical population

Year	Pop.	±%
1941	36,000	—
1951	78,000	+116.7%
1961	130,000	+66.7%
1972	200,000	+53.8%

Year	Pop.	±%
1981	291,000	+45.5%
1998	458,440	+57.5%
2017	872,557	+90.3%
2023	975,886	+11.8%

The total population of the city was 458,440 according to the 1998 census. The majority of the people in the city speak Punjabi with Shahpuri dialect. According to the 2017 Census of Pakistan, the population of city was recorded as 872,557 with a rise of 43.94% from 1998. The population of the metropolitan area (City District) reached 3,903,588, in which around 1 million forms the urban population. The population of Sargodha Division was recorded as 8,181,499 by the 2017 Census of Pakistan.

Religious groups in Sargodha City (1911−2023) (Note: 1911-1941: Data for the entirety of the town of Sargodha, which included Sargodha Municipality. 2017-2023: Urban population of Sargodha Tehsil.)
Religious group	1911		1921		1931		1941		2017		2023	
Religious group	Pop.	%	Pop.	%	Pop.	%	Pop.	%	Pop.	%	Pop.	%
Islam	4,064	45.93%	6,967	39.3%	9,146	34.18%	12,060	33.11%	623,293	94.7%	1,001,238	95.29%
Hinduism (Note: 1931-1941: Including Ad-Dharmis)	3,563	40.26%	8,189	46.19%	11,709	43.75%	17,413	47.81%	22	0%	163	0.02%
Sikhism	964	10.89%	2,168	12.23%	5,201	19.43%	5,920	16.25%	—N/a	—N/a	36	0%
Christianity	232	2.62%	403	2.27%	704	2.63%	998	2.74%	34,053	5.17%	48,781	4.64%
Jainism	5	0.06%	0	0%	1	0%	7	0.02%	—N/a	—N/a	—N/a	—N/a
Zoroastrianism	1	0.01%	0	0%	0	0%	—N/a	—N/a	—N/a	—N/a	2	0%
Buddhism	0	0%	1	0.01%	0	0%	—N/a	—N/a	—N/a	—N/a	—N/a	—N/a
Ahmadiyya	—N/a	—N/a	—N/a	—N/a	—N/a	—N/a	—N/a	—N/a	817	0.12%	434	0.04%
Others	0	0%	0	0%	0	0%	22	0.06%	23	0%	53	0.01%
Total population	8,849	100%	17,728	100%	26,761	100%	36,420	100%	658,208	100%	1,050,707	100%

=== Language ===
Urban Demography of Sargodha Tehsil (2023)
1. Punjabi (79.6%)
2. Urdu (18.5%)
3. Pashto (1.45%)
4. Other (0.41%)

The majority of the population in Sargodha city speaks Punjabi at 79.60%, 18.54% speak Urdu, 1.45% speak Pashto while 0.41% speak other minor languages (mostly Sindhi and Seraiki).

== Economy ==
The majority of Sargodha's economy is based on agriculture. Sargodha is considered the best citrus-producing area of Pakistan and therefore is also known as the California of Pakistan. Sargodha is largest kinnow-producing district of the world. It produces oranges that are considered high-quality, and supplies them to the different parts of the country. These oranges are also exported to other countries. Sargodha produces a large amount of wheat, cotton, rice and vegetables that are transported to other parts of country and exported to other countries.

There are also textile mills, rice processing plants and Nestle and Shezan juice factories.

The Sargodha Chamber of Commerce and Industry monitors industrial activity in the city and reports their findings to the Federation of Pakistan Chambers of Commerce & Industry and provincial government. A dry port is also under construction in Sargodha.

There are also several shopping malls and trade centres with both international and national outlets. Some of them include:

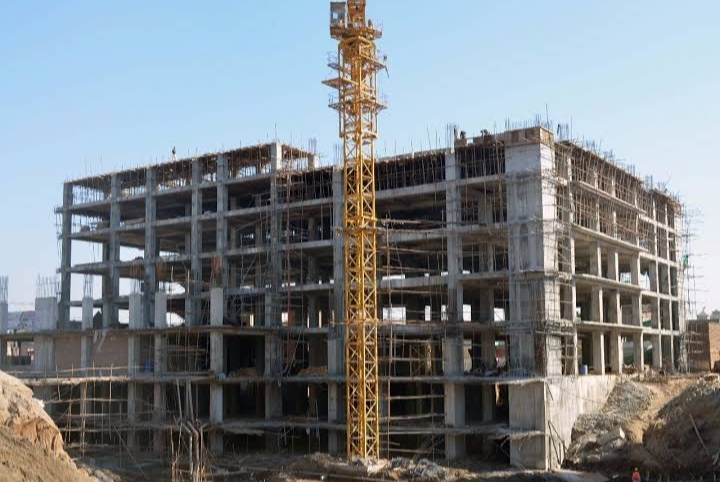
Mall of Sargodha under construction

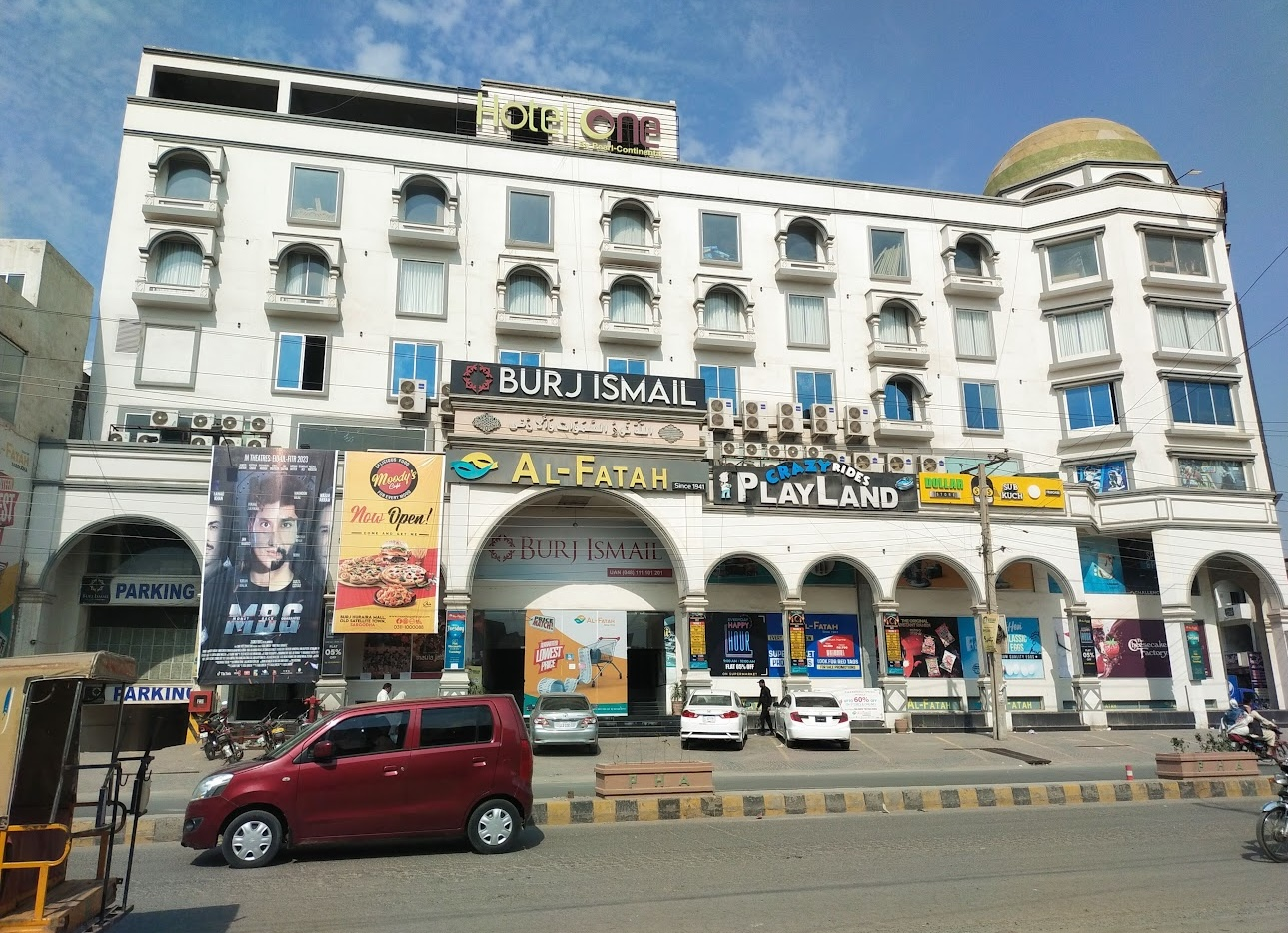
Burj Ismail Mall

- Mall of Sargodha
- Burj Ismail Mall
- Xin Mall
- Chenone Tower
- Burj Huraira Mall
- Al-Rehman Trade Centre
- Toheed Mall
- Modern Shopping Mall (MSM)
- Shaheen Shopping Mall

The fifteen bazaars (markets) of Sargodha remain major trading zones in the city. Each of the fifteen bazaars has a particular name and is known for selling certain goods.

- The Model Bazaar contains food court, joyland and shops of grocery and garments.
- The Urdu Bazaar contains shops of stationery and books.
- The Kachehry Bazaar contains bakeries, street food restaurants and shops of shoes, garments and general stores.
- The Amin Bazaar contains shops of fabrics, boutiques, garments and electric appliances.
- The Muslim Bazaar contains sanitary items and motorcycle repair shops.
- The Anarkali Bazaar contains shops of household items.
- The Sarafa Bazaar contains gold and jewellery shops.
- The Rail Bazaar contains fabric shops.
- The Liaquat Bazaar provides shops for new bicycles and sports cycles.
- The Faisal Bazar provides shops for spices, oil, meat and poultry.
- The Karkhana Bazaar provides shops for crockery and cutlery products.
- The Bans Bazaar supplies dairy and milk products.
- The Kabaarhi Bazaar contains shops of brokers.
- The Fruit Mandi is a fruit market.
- The Sabzi Mandi is a vegetable, meat, fish and grocery market.
- The Main Satellite Town Bazar contains hospitals and pharmacies.

== Administration ==
Divisional and District Administration

Sargodha is the capital of Sargodha Tehsil. As of October 2012, the division system in Punjab Province has been restored and Sargodha became the divisional headquarters of districts Sargodha, Khushab, Mianwali and Bhakkar. Sargodha became the administrative capital of the Sargodha Division, handling over a population of about 8.1 million.

Local Government

The Municipal Committee, Sargodha city was upgraded into Municipal Corporation in 1981 when the population of city was increased over half a million. In December 2019, Sargodha Municipal Corporation was upgraded into Metropolitan Corporation under Punjab Local Government Act, 2019. Metropolitan Corporation Sargodha is currently headed by the Divisional commissioner whereas the seat of mayor is vacant.

Sargodha Development Authority (SDA) was established by the government of Punjab in 2017 which replaced the Sargodha Improvement Trust. SDA is responsible for new planned development in Sargodha. It also regulates and issues permits for new construction and housing projects, private houses, and commercial development.

Sargodha also has a Parks and Horticulture Authority (PHA) which maintains all the parks and horticulture in the city. Moreover, Sargodha Water and Sanitation Agency (WASA) and Sargodha Waste Management Company (SWMC) are currently under planning phase.

=== Safe City Authority Project ===
In 2017, Sargodha was announced as one of six cities in Punjab whose security would be improved by the Punjab Safe Cities Authority. 5.5 billion Rupees were allocated for the project, which was to be modeled along the lines of the Lahore Safe City project in which 8,000 CCTV cameras were installed throughout the city at a cost of 12 billion rupees to record and send images to Integrated Command and Control Centres. In October 2024, the project was finally launched and in the project's first phase, the installation of cameras begin along the main roads of the city.

== Health ==
=== Hospitals ===
Hospital	Type	Location
Combined Military Hospital	Army	Sargodha Garrison
DHQ Teaching Hospital	Public	Mianwali Road
PAF Hospital	Air force	PAF Base Mushaf
Fauji Foundation Hospital	Army	Satellite Town A-Block
Halal-e-Ahmar Hospital	Public	Satellite Town B-Block
University Medical and Research Centre	Public	University of Sargodha

== Education ==
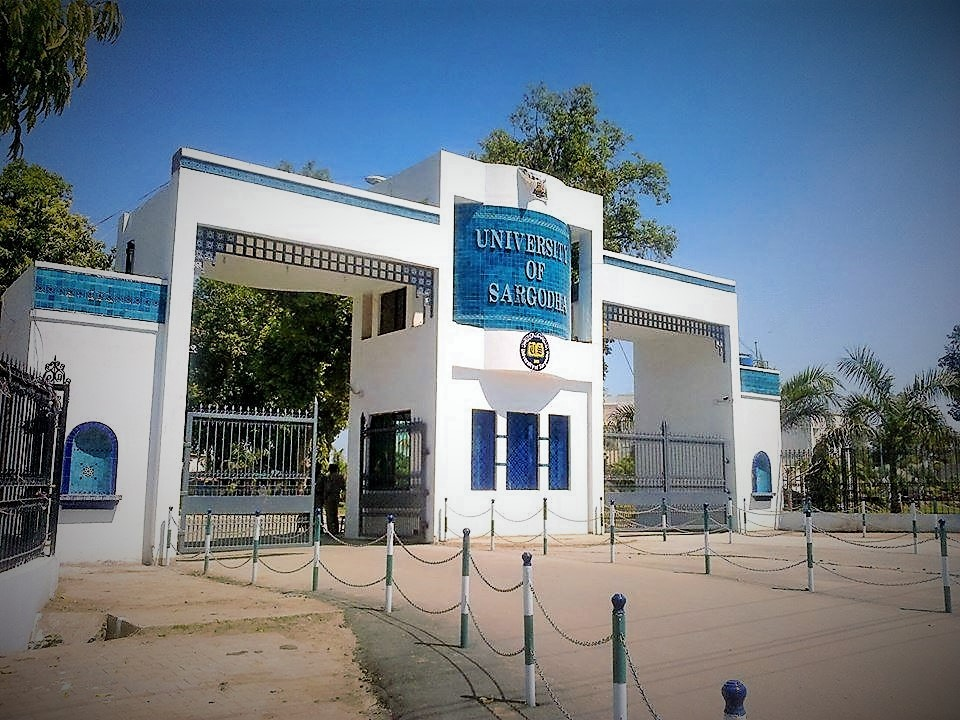
Main Gate to University of Sargodha

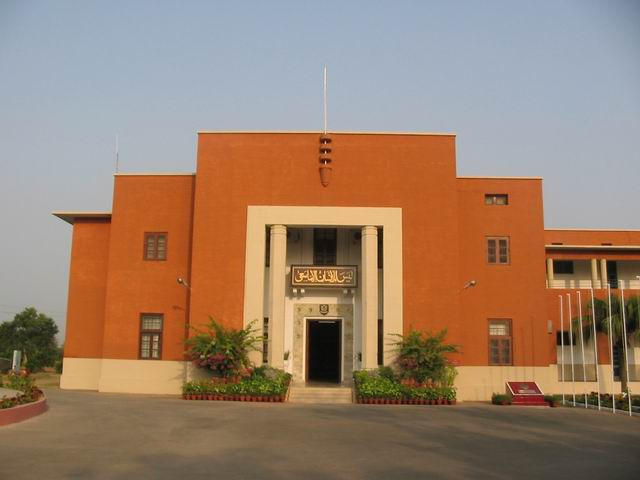
PAF Public School

According to the census of 1998, the literacy rate of Sargodha was 67.8%, while in 2017 the literacy rate was recorded as 80.5%. The city is considered the educational hub of Sargodha Division, handling a population of about 8.1 million. Sargodha Division has its own Education Board for Secondary School Certificate (SSC) and Higher Secondary School Certificate (HSSC) Examinations. There are about four universities and numerous colleges of Medical Sciences, Law, IT, Commerce, Engineering and Intermediate Courses. Quaid-e- Azam Law College is famous for law education.

=== Board of Intermediate and Secondary Education ===
The Board of Intermediate & Secondary Education, Sargodha handles the whole Sargodha Division. It was established in 1968 under the West Pakistan Board of Intermediate & Secondary Education (Multan and Board of Intermediate and Secondary Education, Sargodha) Ordinance No. VII of 1968, with the jurisdiction of Sargodha and Rawalpindi Civil Divisions.

=== Educational institutes ===
Institute	Type	Location	Established	Website		
University of Sargodha	Public	University Road	2002			
University College of Agriculture	Public	Sargodha Bypass near Jhal Chakian	2002			
University of Lahore, Sargodha Campus	Private	Lahore Road	2002			
University of Central Punjab, Sargodha Campus	Private	Lahore Road	2002			
Sargodha Medical College	Public	Faisalabad Road	2006			
Army Public College	Army	Mianwali Road	1975			
PAF College	Air force	PAF Base Mushaf	1953			
Cornelius Law College	Private	Fatima Jinnah Road	2015			
Quaid-e-Azam Law College	Private	Lahore Road	1998			
Punjab College of Science	Private	Khayaban-e-Sadiq (Main Campus)	1985			
The Superior College	Private	Satellite Town A-Block	2000			
Dar-e-Arqam College	Private	Satellite Town A-Block	2002	Superior University	Lahore Road	2020
Sargodha Institute of Technology		University Road	1927			
American Lycetuff School	Private	Queens Road	1996			
Root Millennium School	Private	Queens Road	1988			
Beaconhouse School System	Private	University Road	1975			
The City School	Private	Queens Road	1978			
Lahore Grammar School	Private	Mushaf Ali Mir Road	1979			
Army Public School	Army	Mianwali Road	1975			
Fauji Foundation School	Army	Civil Lines	1954			
Allied School	Private	Main Garden Town Road	1985			
KIPS Academy	Private	Satellite Town A-Block	1992			

== Transportation ==
=== Road ===
==== Roads and flyovers ====
The 4 km (2.5 mi) long University Road runs from 47 Pull to Khayyam Chowk. Other main roads include 6 km (3.7 mi) long Fatima Jinnah Road & City Road, Canal Road, Katchery Road, Stadium Road, Club Road, Jail Road, Queens Road, Mushaf Ali Mir Road, Railway Road, Lahore Road, Faisalabad Road, Eid Gah Road, Mianwali Road, Sillanwali Road, Bhalwal Road, and Shaheenabad Road.

There are 3 flyovers located in the city area to regulate the flow of traffic:

- Khayyam Chowk's flyover has a length of 1 km (0.62 mi) that leads to Mianwali Road.
- Fatima Jinnah Road's flyover also has a length of 1 km (0.62 mi).
- A 0.4 km (0.25 mi) long flyover is located on Kachehry Road.

==== Motorways and highways ====
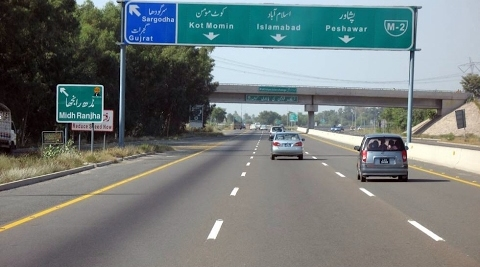
Motorway M2 exit to Sargodha

Sargodha lies about 45 km (28 mi) from the M-2 Motorway, which connects Lahore and Islamabad. The N-60 National Highway runs from Sargodha to Lahore through Pindi Bhattian and Sheikhupura. It is also connected to Faisalabad by a highway.

=== Buses ===
General Bus Stand is located on Fatima Jinnah Road that provides bus service from Sargodha to almost every part of the country. Daewoo Bus Service drives regular routes from Sargodha to the rest of the country. Others include Niazi Express, Faisal Movers, Bilal Travels, Islamabad Express and Skyways etc.

=== Taxi and rickshaws ===
The online cab service inDrive and some locally owned cab services such as Apni-Sawari are available in the city. Many auto rickshaws are also available throughout the city, which are often used by those who cannot afford the cab services.

=== Rail ===
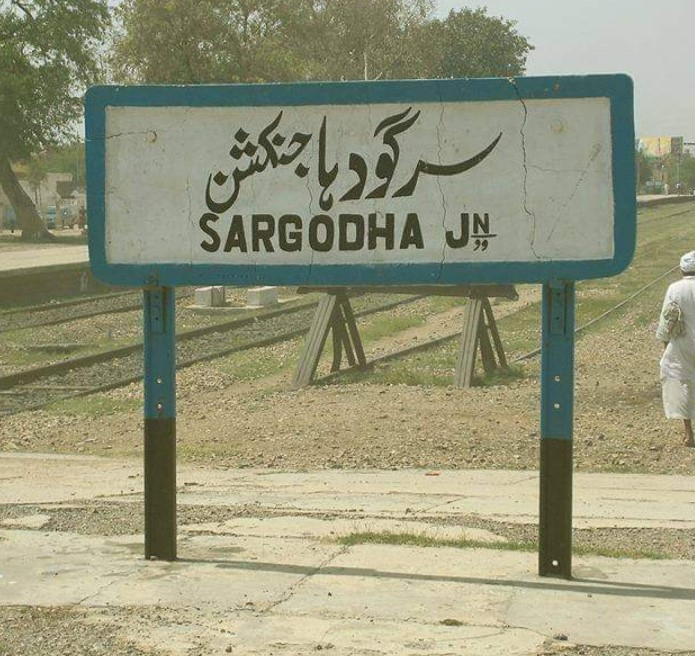
Sargodha Junction railway station

Sargodha is also connected by the rest of the country through the rail. Sargodha Junction railway station is located on Shorkot-Lala Musa branch railway line. Hazara Express, Millat Express, Sandal Express and Sargodha Express provide daily transport to Rawalpindi, Lahore, Faisalabad, Multan, Karachi and other major cities.

== Air base ==
Pakistan's largest airbase, PAF Base Mushaf (formerly PAF Base Sargodha), is situated in Sargodha and hosts the headquarters of the Pakistan Air Force's Central Air Command. The airbase is also home to the Combat Commanders School (CCS), formerly the Fighter Leader's School.

== Recreation ==
=== Points of interest ===
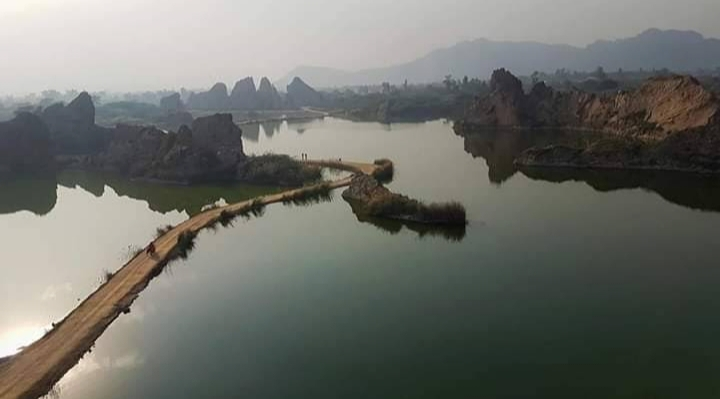
Lake of Kirana Hills

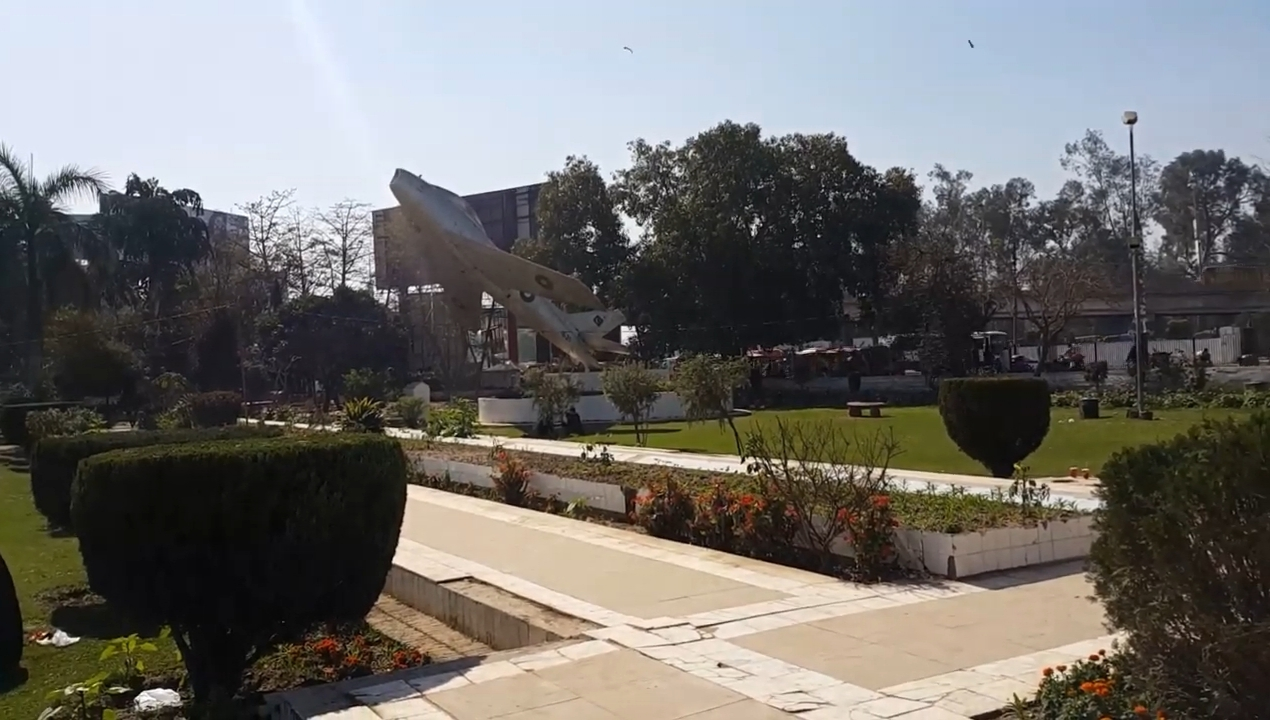
Antique fighter jet mounted at Company Bagh

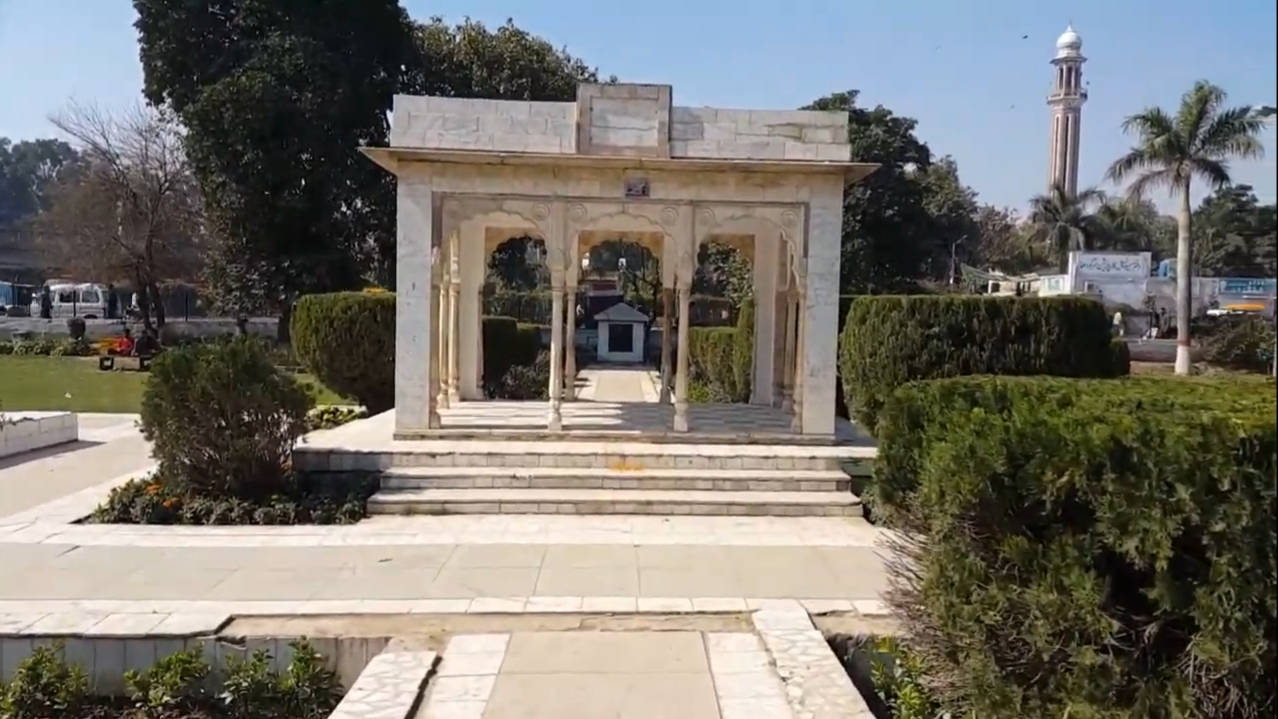
Centre point of famous Company Bagh

==== Kirana Hills ====
The Kirana Hills are a small and extensive rocky mountain range located in Sargodha. They are a commonly-visited tourist attraction in Sargodha City. Locally known as the Black Mountains due to their brownish landscape, their highest peak is about 980 feet (300 m).

==== Jinnah Hall ====
Jinnah Hall is a historical landmark in Sargodha. Jinnah Hall was built in 1949. It was named for Muhammad Ali Jinnah, the founder of Pakistan. Jinnah Hall was originally built as a town hall and library in Company Bagh, Sargodha; now it is currently used as an exhibition hall, event space, and library.

== Sports ==
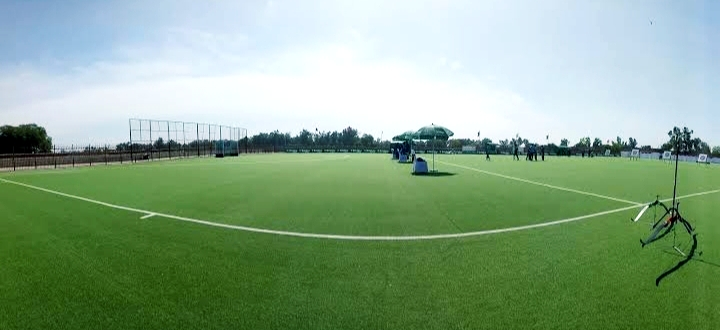
Sargodha Astroturf Hockey Stadium

Sargodha is home to the Sargodha Cricket Stadium. Sargodha's cricket team was a first-class cricket team that represented Sargodha Division. They competed in Pakistan's first-class tournaments in 1961–62 and 2002–03. There's a sports complex adjacent to the stadium that includes gym as well as basketball, badminton and table tennis courts. Moreover, karate classes also take place regularly at the complex.

Mela Mandi Ground is a multi-use historic stadium in Sargodha. It is mostly used for staging cricket and football matches. The Mela Mandi Ground was constructed to provide a vast ground for outdoor sports and activities. During March, every year (the country's spring season), several competitions are held here, attracting considerable spectator numbers.

Sargodha is also home to Sargodha Astroturf Hockey Stadium, located near Mela Mandi Ground. It is home to the Sargodha District Hockey Team, and provides a reliable platform for the city's youth. Galaxy Sports Complex is a renowned Sports Academy of the city.

A flood-lit football ground is under construction in Company Bagh, Sargodha.

== Food and drink ==
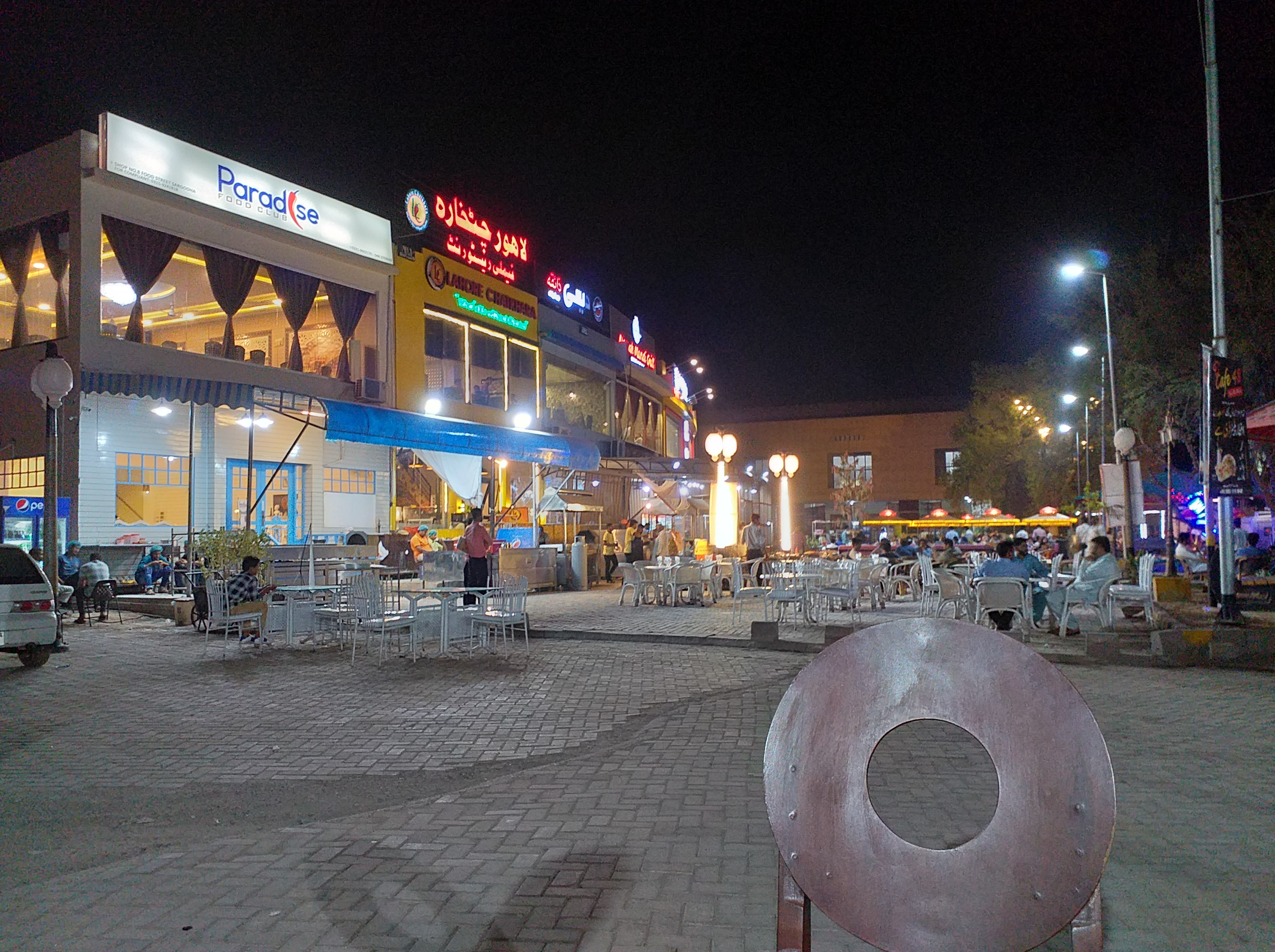
Food Street on Stadium Road, Sargodha

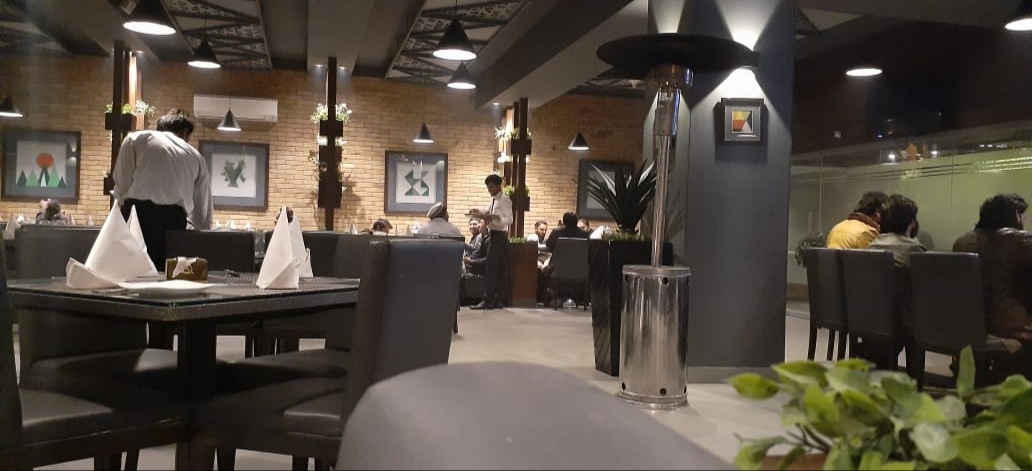
A local restaurant in Sargodha

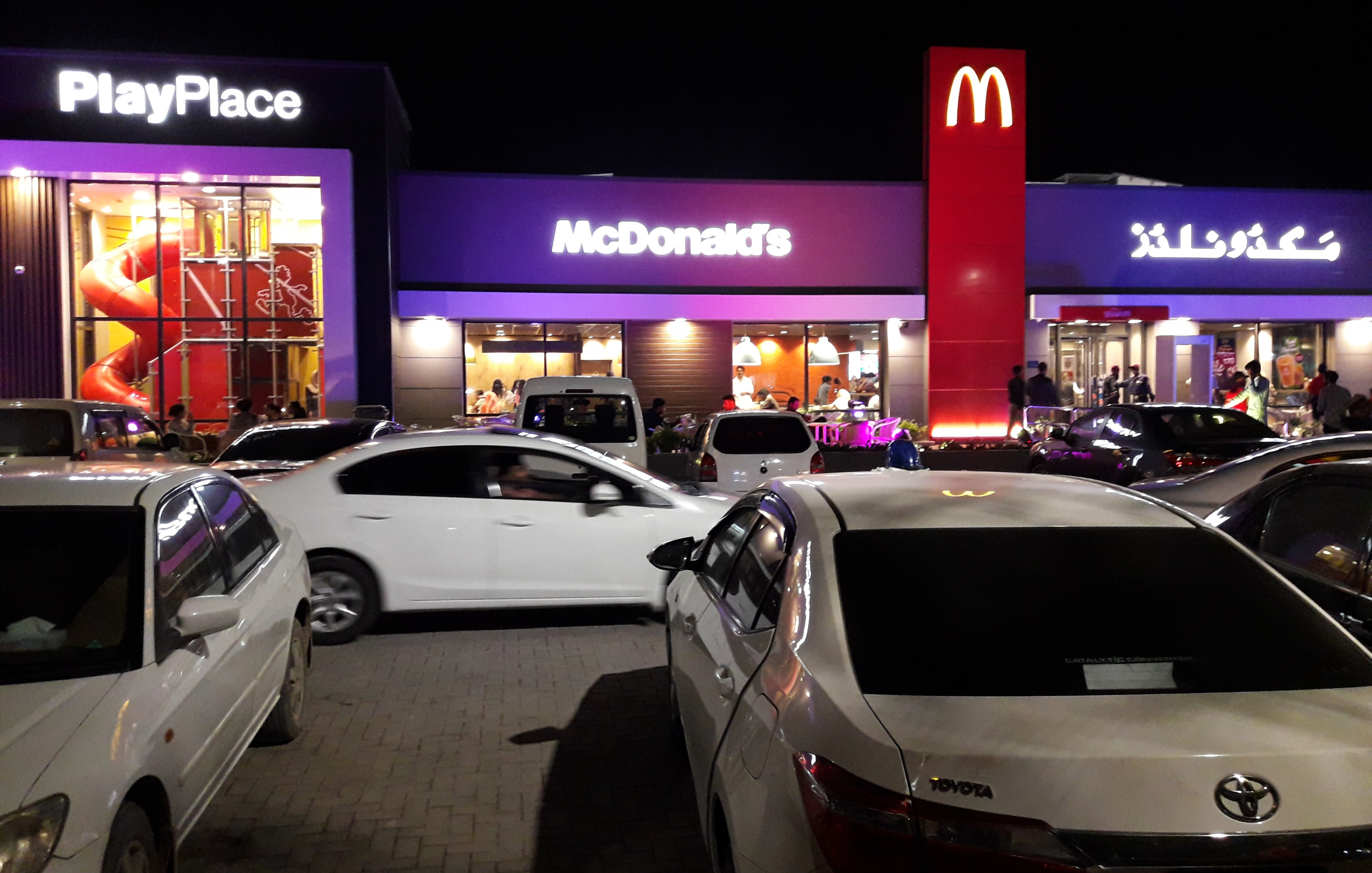
A McDonald's outlet in Sargodha

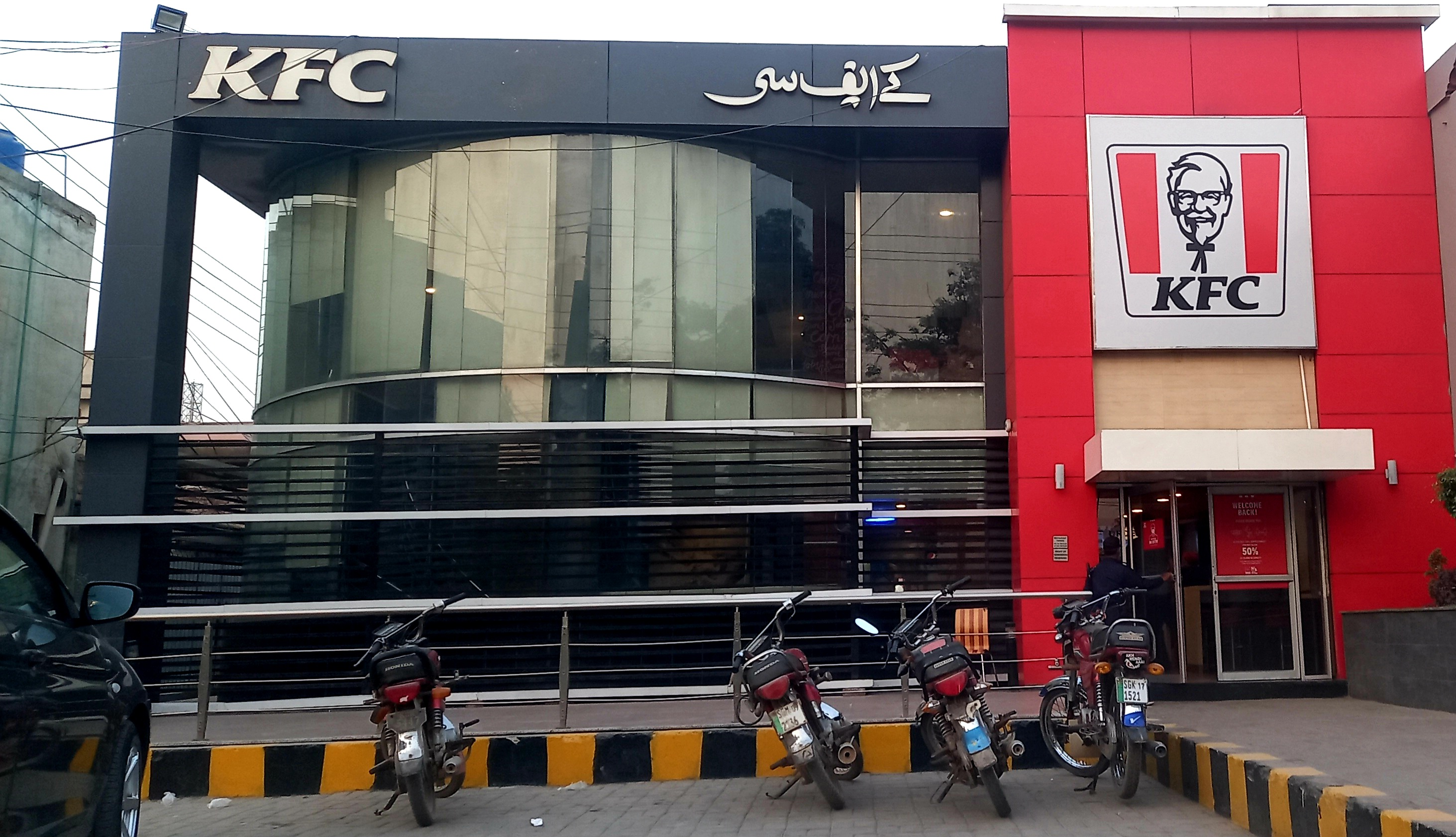
KFC outlet, University Road, Sargodha

=== Traditional food and drink ===
The cuisine of Sargodha is similar to that of other regions of South Asia, with some of it originating from the royal kitchens of 16th-century Mughal emperors. Most of those dishes have their roots in British, Indian, Central Asian and Middle Eastern cuisine. Pakistani cooking uses large quantities of spices, herbs, and seasoning. Garlic, ginger, turmeric, red chili, and garam masala are used in most dishes, and home cooking regularly includes curry. Roti, a thin flatbread made from wheat, is a staple food, usually served with curry, meat, vegetables, and lentils. Rice is also common; it is served plain, fried with spices, and in sweet dishes.

Lassi is a traditional drink in Punjab, including Sargodha. Black tea with milk and sugar is also popular throughout the city and is consumed daily by most of the population.

=== Fast food ===
Fast food is also very popular across the city. Along with local fast food restaurants, there are also several international fast food outlets in the city, including KFC, McDonald's, Subway and Domino's. The world's biggest Gloria Jean's store is also located in Sargodha.

== Awards ==
In 1966, the Government of Pakistan awarded a special flag, the Hilal-e-Istaqlal to Sargodha (also to Lahore and Sialkot) for showing severe resistance to the enemy during the Indo-Pakistani War of 1965 as these cities were targets of the Indian advance. Every year on Defence Day (6 September), this flag is hoisted in these cities in recognition of the will, courage and perseverance of their people.

== Notable people ==
- Air Commodore Sajad Haider, 1965 War hero
- Sarfraz Ali (general), Corps Commander Quetta
- Wazir Agha, Urdu Scholar
- Rafiq Anjum, actor
- Imtiaz Bhatti, former Ambassador / High Commissioner of Pakistan
- Rubina Feroze Bhatti, human rights activist
- Aizaz Cheema, cricketer
- Chaudhry Anwar Ali Cheema, politician, PML-Q
- Hameed Gul, former ISI Chief
- Mohammad Hafeez, cricketer
- Neelo, Film actress
- Farhat Hashmi, Islamic Scholar
- Chaudhary Ghias Ahmed Mela, politician, PML-Q
- Ali Haider Noor Khan Niazi, politician
- Feroz Khan Noon, former Prime Minister Pakistan
- Anwer Ali Noon, former Parliamentarian of Pakistan and army Officer
- Amjad Ali Noon, former Ambassador / High Commissioner of Pakistan
- Bakht Singh (1903–2000), prominent Christian leader and church planter, especially in India and Pakistan—born in nearby Joiya village, raised in Sargodha where his father Jawahar Mall owned a factory
- Khalid Iqbal Yasir, poet
- Tahira Wasti, Film and television actress
- Tariq Masood, Islamic Scholar
- Fatima Zahra, first Pakistani woman to win a Commonwealth Games boxing medal
