= Punjab Institute of Cardiology =

Pakistani hospital

- Government of Punjab
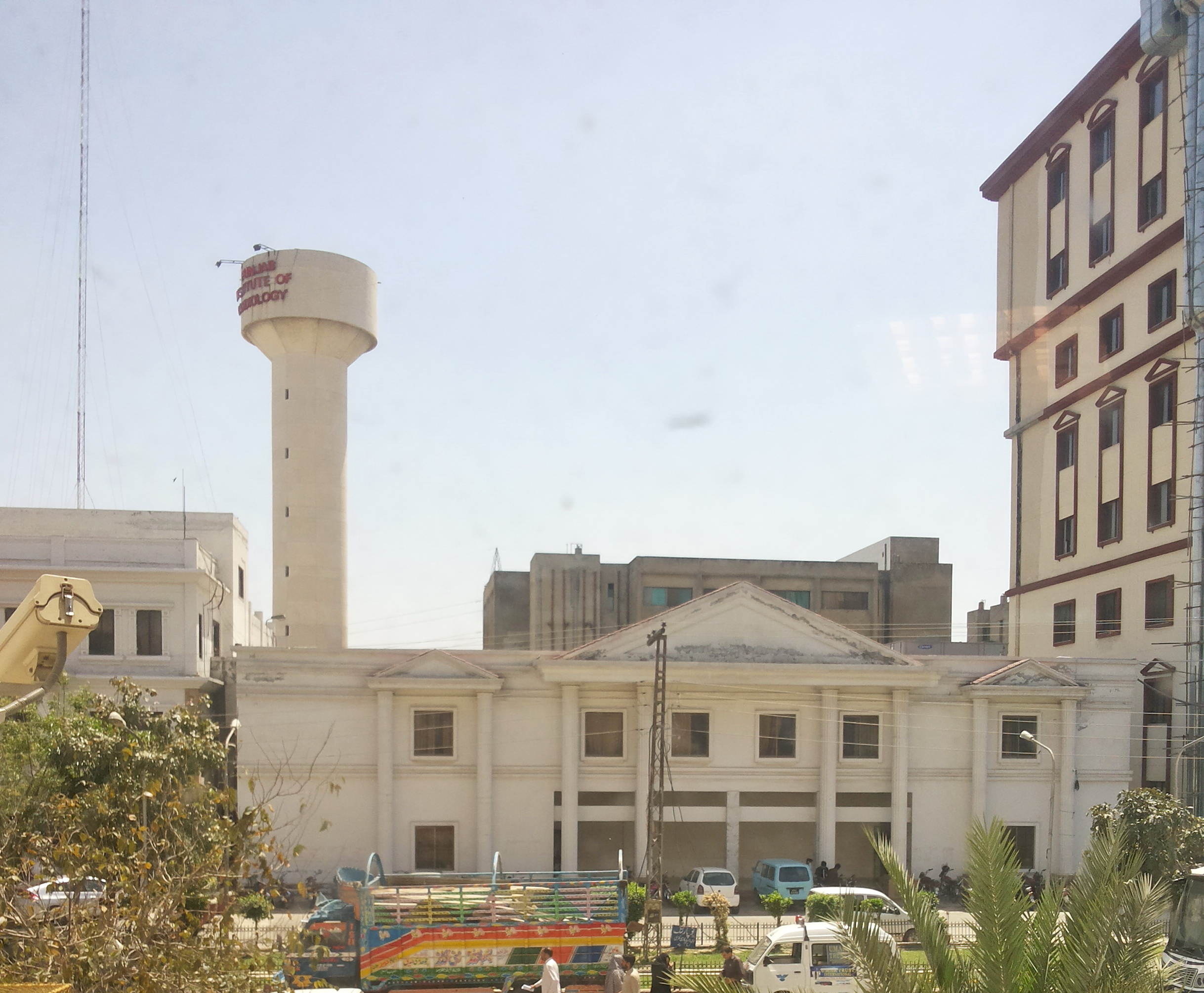
- Tower of the hospital

- Location within Pakistan

Geography
- Location: Lahore, Punjab, Pakistan
- Coordinates: 31.538685°N 74.335889°E

Services
- Emergency department: Yes

Helipads
- Helipad: No

History
- Founded: 1989

Links
- Website: http://www.pic.punjab.gov.pk//
- Lists: Hospitals in Pakistan

The Punjab Institute of Cardiology (PIC), located in Lahore, Pakistan, is a 547-bed tertiary care hospital. Wither over 1500 staff members, the institute provides cardiac care service nationwide, treating more than 300,000 patients annually.

== Services ==
In addition to its cardiac consultation services, the Punjab Institute of Cardiology offers a comprehensive range of medical services, including an Outpatient Department (OPD) and an array of advanced diagnostic services such as Electrocardiograms (ECG), Exercise Tolerance Tests (ETT), Angiography, Angioplasty, Electrophysiology studies, and CT scans. These diagnostic tools play a pivotal role in the accurate assessment and management of cardiovascular diseases. - ECG, ETT, Angiography, Angioplasty, Electrophysiology, CT Scan

The hospital offers outpatient services, advanced diagnostics, interventional and invasive cardiology, as well as cardiac surgery. The hospital also provides fully equipped cardiac ambulatory services 24/7. Each year, more than 160,000 patients are examined in the OPD, with over 17,000 admissions. As the second largest cardiac centre in Pakistan, after NICVD Karachi, PIC performs 31,000 echocardiograms, 4,000 nuclear medicine procedures, 16,000 angiograms, 3,500 angioplasties (including 5,000 stents placements), and 2,500 cardiac surgeries annually.

== Research and training ==
Punjab Institute of Cardiology is also actively involved in research and postgraduate training in cardiology, cardiac surgery and anesthesia. It is the first ISO certified hospital in the government sector.

In 2015, the College of Physicians and Surgeons Pakistan selected the Punjab Institute of Cardiology for training in Electrophysiology and Interventional Cardiology.

90% of patients at the Punjab Institute of Cardiology (PIC) receive free treatment; it is a government-funded hospital.

== Emergency department expansion ==
An expanded emergency department is to open in March 2016 and was near completion in January 2016. This will help the hospital handle heavy workload better at the emergency department.

== Incidents ==
=== 2012 patient deaths crisis ===
An incident that occurred in January 2012 at this institution showed a problem with drug packaging. That month more than 100 heart patients died of overdoses from a particular drug that had inadequate labeling. Hundreds more patients suffered nonfatal adverse reactions from this drug. This problem, while bringing unwanted attention to the Punjab Institute of Cardiology, was not unique to that hospital system.

=== 2019 attack ===
On 11 December 2019, in an unprecedented assault on a hospital led to death of 3 patients and injuries to several others. However, the Young Doctors Association (YDA) of Pakistan reports for death of 12 patients during the attack at hospital. Reportedly a large number of lawyers started marching from Mall Road Lahore and gathered outside the Punjab Institute of Cardiology to protest against a mocking viral video. They closed the hospital's entrance and exit points, within no time their protest turned violent and remained catastrophic for hours.
