= University of Sargodha =

Public university in Sargodha, Punjab, Pakistan

- Former names: Government College Sargodha (1963-2002); De'Montmorency College (1929-1963); O’Brien Islamia High School (1916-1929)
- Type: Public university
- Established: 1916
- Affiliations: Higher Education Commission of Pakistan; Pakistan Engineering Council; Pakistan Bar Council; Pharmacy Council of Pakistan; National Technology Council
- Chancellor: Governor of the Punjab
- Vice-Chancellor: Dr. Qaisar Abbas
- Location: Sargodha, Punjab, Pakistan
- Colors: Yale blue, silver & metallic gold
- Nickname: SU
- Mascot: Kiranians
- Website: su.edu.pk

The University of Sargodha (colloquially known as SU) is a public university located in Sargodha, Punjab, Pakistan.

== Recognized university ==
University of Sargodha is recognized by the Higher Education Commission of Pakistan.

== History ==
In 1916, O’Brien Islamia High School was established at Shahpur Sadar. It was upgraded to De'Montmorency College in 1929. The college was shifted to Sargodha in 1946. Later, it was renamed to Government College Sargodha in 1963. Postgraduate classes were introduced in 1987. In 2002, the college was granted the status of an independent university.

== Faculties ==
- Faculty of Pharmacy
- Faculty of Agriculture
- Faculty of Engineering & Technology
- Faculty of Health Sciences
- Faculty of Science
- Faculty of Social Sciences
- School of Arts & Humanities
- Faculty of Computer Science

== See also ==
- List of universities in Pakistan
