= Pakistan at the 2025 World Aquatics Championships =

- Flag of Pakistan
- World Aquatics code: PAK
- National federation: Pakistan Swimming Federation
- Website: pakswimfed.org.pk

in Singapore
- Competitors: 3 in 1 sport
- Medals: Gold 0 Silver 0 Bronze 0 Total 0

World Aquatics Championships appearances
- 1973; 1975; 1978; 1982; 1986; 1991; 1994; 1998; 2001; 2003; 2005; 2007; 2009; 2011; 2013; 2015; 2017; 2019; 2022; 2023; 2024; 2025

Pakistan is competing at the 2025 World Aquatics Championships in Singapore from 11 July to 3 August 2025.

== Competitors ==
The following is the list of competitors in the Championships.

Sport	Men	Women	Total
Swimming	1	2	3
Total	1	2	3

== Swimming ==
Men

Athlete	Event	Heat		Semifinal		Final	
Athlete	Event	Time	Rank	Time	Rank	Time	Rank
Aryaan Din	50 m freestyle	23.87	68	Did not advance			
Aryaan Din	100 m freestyle	51.65	62	Did not advance			

Women

Athlete	Event	Heat		Semifinal		Final	
Athlete	Event	Time	Rank	Time	Rank	Time	Rank
Hareem Malik	50 m breaststroke	37.11	49	Did not advance			
Hareem Malik	50 m butterfly	33.20	76	Did not advance			
Jehanara Nabi	200 m freestyle	2:09.88	42	Did not advance			
Jehanara Nabi	400 m freestyle	4:35.88	29	—N/a		Did not advance	
