= Pakistan at the 2023 World Aquatics Championships =

- Flag of Pakistan
- World Aquatics code: PAK
- National federation: Pakistan Swimming Federation
- Website: pakswimfed.org.pk

in Fukuoka, Japan
- Competitors: 4 in 1 sport
- Medals: Gold 0 Silver 0 Bronze 0 Total 0

World Aquatics Championships appearances
- 1973; 1975; 1978; 1982; 1986; 1991; 1994; 1998; 2001; 2003; 2005; 2007; 2009; 2011; 2013; 2015; 2017; 2019; 2022; 2023; 2024; 2025

Pakistan competed at the 2023 World Aquatics Championships in Fukuoka, Japan from 14 to 30 July.

== Swimming ==
Pakistan entered 4 swimmers.

Men

Athlete	Event	Heat		Semifinal		Final	
Athlete	Event	Time	Rank	Time	Rank	Time	Rank
Muhammad Amaan Siddiqui	200 metre freestyle	1:58.36 NR	63	Did not advance			
Muhammad Amaan Siddiqui	400 metre freestyle	4:12.29 NR	50	—N/a		Did not advance	
Syed Muhammad Haseeb Tariq	50 metre freestyle	24.76	81	Did not advance			
Syed Muhammad Haseeb Tariq	100 metre freestyle	53.99	89	Did not advance			

Women

Athlete	Event	Heat		Semifinal		Final	
Athlete	Event	Time	Rank	Time	Rank	Time	Rank
Bisma Khan	50 metre freestyle	28.45	71	Did not advance			
Bisma Khan	50 metre butterfly	29.63	49	Did not advance			
Jehanara Nabi	100 metre freestyle	1:01.39	53	Did not advance			
Jehanara Nabi	200 metre freestyle	2:11.09 NR	53	Did not advance			
