= List of Pakistani records in swimming =

The Pakistani records in swimming are the fastest ever performances of swimmers from Pakistan, which are recognised and ratified by the Pakistan Swimming Federation. So far the national federation maintains an official list only in long course events.

All records were set in finals unless noted otherwise.

== Long Course (50 m) ==
=== Men ===
Event	Time		Name	Club	Date	Meet	Location	Ref
50 m freestyle	23.66		Hamza Asif	Wapda Sports Board	10 December 2025	National Games	Karachi, Pakistan	
100 m freestyle	50.97	h	Aryaan Din	Pakistan	25 May 2025	AP Race London International	London, United Kingdom	
200 m freestyle	1:55.68		Muhammad Ahmed Durrani	Speedo Swim Squads	27 April 2024	Malaysia Age Group Championships	Kuala Lumpur, Malaysia	
400 m freestyle	4:12.29	h	Muhammad Amaan Siddiqui	Pakistan	23 July 2023	World Championships	Fukuoka, Japan	
800 m freestyle	8:56.97		Muhammad Amaan Siddiqui	Army	4 March 2023	Pakistani Championships	Lahore, Pakistan	
1500 m freestyle	17:02.54		Kamal Salman Masud	Pakistan	22 December 1991	South Asian Games	Colombo, Sri Lanka	
50 m backstroke	27.12		Syed Tariq	North York Aquatic Club	4 April 2019	Canadian Trials	Toronto, Canada	
100 m backstroke	58.56		Syed Tariq	North York Aquatic Club	3 April 2019	Canadian Trials	Toronto, Canada	
200 m backstroke	2:14.09		Syed Tariq	WAPDA	3 November 2018	Pakistani Championships	Lahore, Pakistan	
50 m breaststroke	29.63	h	Hamza Asif	Pakistan	26 July 2026	Commonwealth Games	Glasgow, United Kingdom	
100 m breaststroke	1:06.85		Rayan Awan	Camden Swiss Cottage Swimming	28 March 2026	Legacy Meet	London, United Kingdom	
200 m breaststroke	2:31.23		Muhammad Mustafa	Army	11 November 2019	National Games	Islamabad, Pakistan	
50 m butterfly	25.41	h	Aryaan Din	Brompton	25 May 2026	AP Race London International	London, United Kingdom	
100 m butterfly	56.58	h	Aryaan Din	Brompton	23 May 2026	AP Race London International	London, United Kingdom	
200 m butterfly	2:10.87		Kamal Salman Masud	Pakistan	1 October 1999	South Asian Games	Kathmandu, Nepal	
200 m individual medley	2:09.79	h	Muhammad Ahmed Durrani	Pakistan	24 July 2026	Commonwealth Games	Glasgow, United Kingdom	
400 m individual medley	4:42.56		Muhammad Ahmed Durrani	Speedo Swim Squads	16 February 2025	Dubai Open Championships	Dubai, United Arab Emirates	
4×100 m freestyle relay	3:44.22		Syed Tariq (53.89); Muhammad Khan (56.34); Ali Safdar (57.63); Shahbaz Khan (56.36)	Pakistan	13 May 2017	Islamic Solidarity Games	Baku, Azerbaijan	
4×100 m freestyle relay	3:42.76	#	Amman Khawar; Muhammad Raza; Agha Wasay; Aryaan Khawar	Punjab	3 November 2024	Pakistani Championships	Lahore, Pakistan	
4×200 m freestyle relay	8:18.47		Maroof Muhammad; Bilal Bux; Sabir Shah; Kamal Salman Masud	Pakistan	20 December 1993	South Asian Games	Dhaka, Bangladesh	
4×100 m medley relay	4:10.92		Syed Tariq (59.05); Muhammad Hamza Malik (1:13.96); Kawas Behram Aga (1:02.25); Muhammad Yahya Khan (55.66)	Pakistan	24 August 2018	Asian Games	Jakarta, Indonesia	
4×100 m medley relay	4:07.61	#	Syed Tariq; Muhammad Mustafa; Azhar Abbas; Shahbaz Khan	Army	13 November 2019	National Games	Islamabad, Pakistan	

Legend: # – Record awaiting ratification by Pakistan Swimming Federation; WR – World record; AS – Asian record; e – equalled existing record;
Records not set in finals: h – heat; sf – semifinal; r – relay 1st leg; rh – relay heat 1st leg; b – B final; † – en route to final mark; so – swim-off; tt – time trial

=== Women ===
Event	Time		Name	Club	Date	Meet	Location	Ref
50 m freestyle	27.78	h	Bisma Khan	Pakistan	30 July 2021	Olympic Games	Tokyo, Japan	
100 m freestyle	59.88	h	Jehanara Nabi	Chelsea&West	26 May 2025	AP Race London International	London, United Kingdom	
200 m freestyle	2:08.57		Jehanara Nabi	Pakistan	10 April 2024	Thailand Age Group Championships	Samut Prakan, Thailand	
400 m freestyle	4:32.71		Jehanara Nabi	Pakistan	7 April 2024	Thailand Age Group Championships	Samut Prakan, Thailand	
800 m freestyle	9:18.33		Jehanara Nabi	Pakistan	6 April 2024	Thailand Age Group Championships	Samut Prakan, Thailand	
1500 m freestyle	18:01.98		Jehanara Nabi	Pakistan	23 May 2024	Malaysia Open Championships	Kuala Lumpur, Malaysia	
50m backstroke	31.43	h	Bisma Khan	Pakistan	9 April 2018	Commonwealth Games	Gold Coast, Australia	
100m backstroke	1:09.61	sf	Bisma Khan	Pakistan	13 May 2017	Islamic Solidarity Games	Baku, Azerbaijan	
200m backstroke	2:33.39	h	Imaal Ahmed	Pakistan	25 August 2017	World Junior Championships	Indianapolis, United States	
50m breaststroke	35.62		Hareem Malik	Sindh	11 October 2024	Pakistan Age Group Championships	Lahore, Pakistan	
100m breaststroke	1:18.58		Lianna Swan	Pakistan	7 February 2016	South Asian Games	Guwahati, India	
200m breaststroke	2:48.85		Lianna Swan	Pakistan	6 February 2016	South Asian Games	Guwahati, India	
50m butterfly	29.12	h	Bisma Khan	Pakistan	2 November 2019	World Cup	Kazan, Russia	
100m butterfly	1:06.38	h	Bisma Khan	Army	3 November 2018	Pakistani Championships	Lahore, Pakistan	
200m butterfly	2:37.26	h	Jehanara Nabi	Pakistan	11 April 2023	Thailand Age Group Championships	Bangkok, Thailand	
200m individual medley	2:27.61		Jehanara Nabi	Pakistan	11 April 2024	Thailand Age Group Championships	Samut Prakan, Thailand	
400m individual medley	5:07.91		Jehanara Nabi	Pakistan	8 April 2024	Thailand Age Group Championships	Samut Prakan, Thailand	
4×100m freestyle relay	4:22.38		Kiran Khan (1:03.92); Bisma Khan (1:05.63); Areeba Shaikh (1:07.47); Lianna Swan (1:05.36)	Pakistan	6 February 2016	South Asian Games	Guwahati, India	
4×200m freestyle relay	9:48.04		Kiran Khan (2:19.41); Bisma Khan (2:31.29); Areeba Shaikh (2:33.68); Lianna Swan (2:23.66)	Pakistan	9 February 2016	South Asian Games	Guwahati, India	
4×100m medley relay	4:48.01		Bisma Khan (1:11.24); Lianna Swan (1:18.20); Kiran Khan (1:10.23); Areeba Shaikh (1:08.34)	Pakistan	10 February 2016	South Asian Games	Guwahati, India	

Legend: # – Record awaiting ratification by Pakistan Swimming Federation; WR – World record; AS – Asian record; e – equalled existing record;
Records not set in finals: h – heat; sf – semifinal; r – relay 1st leg; rh – relay heat 1st leg; b – B final; † – en route to final mark; so – swim-off; tt – time trial

=== Mixed relay ===
Event	Time		Name	Club	Date	Meet	Location	Ref
4×100 m freestyle relay	3:55.82	h	Jehanara Nabi (1:00.97); Mohid Sadiq Lone (56.04); Mishael Aisha Hyat Ayub (1:05.06); Syed Muhammad Daniyal Hatim (53.75)	Pakistan	8 November 2025	Islamic Solidarity Games	Riyadh, Saudi Arabia	
4×100 m medley relay	4:26.73		Ali Muhammed Mitha (1:04.16); Hareem Malik (1:21.94); Mishael Aisha Hyat Ayub (59.49); Jehanara Nabi (1:01.14)	Pakistan	10 November 2025	Islamic Solidarity Games	Riyadh, Saudi Arabia	

Legend: # – Record awaiting ratification by Pakistan Swimming Federation; WR – World record; AS – Asian record; e – equalled existing record;
Records not set in finals: h – heat; sf – semifinal; r – relay 1st leg; rh – relay heat 1st leg; b – B final; † – en route to final mark; so – swim-off; tt – time trial

== Short Course (25 m) ==
=== Men ===
Event	Time		Name	Club	Date	Meet	Location	Ref
50 m freestyle	23.72	h	Syed Tariq	Pakistan	28 October 2022	World Cup	Toronto, Canada	
100 m freestyle	50.47	h	Aryaan Din	Pakistan	11 December 2024	World Championships	Budapest, Hungary	
200 m freestyle	1:49.49	h	Aryaan Din	Pakistan	15 December 2024	World Championships	Budapest, Hungary	
400 m freestyle	4:08.41		Muhammad Ahmed Durrani	Speedo Swim Squads	22 October 2023	Hamilton Aquatics Championships	Dubai, United Arab Emirates	
800 m freestyle	8:55.80		Azlan Sohail	Toronto Swim Club	10 November 2024	NYAC Cup	Toronto, Canada	
1500 m freestyle	18:02.67		Zeeshan Akbar	Pakistan	6 December 2019	South Asian Games	Kathmandu, Nepal	
50m backstroke	25.86	h	Syed Tariq	York Lions	11 February 2017	OUA Championships	Toronto, Canada	
100m backstroke	56.30		Syed Tariq	North York Aquatic Club	7 December 2018	Youth Cup	Toronto, Canada	
200m backstroke	2:08.22		Syed Tariq	North York Aquatic Club	9 December 2018	Youth Cup	Toronto, Canada	
50m breaststroke	29.53		Muhammad Ahmed Durrani	Speedo Swim Squads	23 November 2024	Speedo Invitational Meet	Dubai, United Arab Emirates	
100m breaststroke	1:04.52		Muhammad Ahmed Durrani	Speedo Swim Squads	7 December 2024	Hamilton Aquatics Winter Wonder	Dubai, United Arab Emirates	
200m breaststroke	2:20.27		Muhammad Ahmed Durrani	Speedo Swim Squads	6 December 2024	Hamilton Aquatics Winter Wonder	Dubai, United Arab Emirates	
50m butterfly	25.05	h	Daniyal Hatim	Pakistan	10 December 2024	World Championships	Budapest, Hungary	
100m butterfly	56.69	h	Daniyal Hatim	Pakistan	13 December 2024	World Championships	Budapest, Hungary	
200m butterfly	2:14.42		Azhar Abbas	Pakistan	8 December 2019	South Asian Games	Kathmandu, Nepal	
100m individual medley	58.67		Muhammad Ahmed Durrani	Speedo Swim Squads	21 October 2023	Hamilton Aquatics Championships	Dubai, United Arab Emirates	
200m individual medley	2:06.87		Muhammad Ahmed Durrani	Speedo Swim Squads	24 November 2024	Speedo Invitational Meet	Dubai, United Arab Emirates	
400m individual medley	4:33.13		Muhammad Ahmed Durrani	Speedo Swim Squads	23 November 2024	Speedo Invitational Meet	Dubai, United Arab Emirates	
4×50m freestyle relay	1:47.37	h	Muhammad Khan (24.75); Muhammad Malik (28.40); Farrukh Shahzad (27.40); Waqas Hussain (26.82)	Pakistan	24 September 2017	Asian Indoor and Martial Arts Games	Ashgabat, Turkmenistan	
4×100m freestyle relay	3:38.36		Syed Tariq; Shahbaz Khan; Azlan Khan; Muhammad Khan	Pakistan	5 December 2019	South Asian Games	Kathmandu, Nepal	
4×200m freestyle relay	8:18.46			Pakistan	8 December 2019	South Asian Games	Kathmandu, Nepal	
4×50m medley relay	1:55.92	h	Waqas Hussain (30.06); Muhammad Malik (32.81); Farrukh Shahzad (28.37); Muhammad Khan (24.68)	Pakistan	22 September 2017	Asian Indoor and Martial Arts Games	Ashgabat, Turkmenistan	
4×100m medley relay	4:04.25		Syed Tariq; Meherwan Patel; Azhar Abbas; Muhammad Khan	Pakistan	9 December 2019	South Asian Games	Kathmandu, Nepal	

Legend: # – Record awaiting ratification by Pakistan Swimming Federation; WR – World record; AS – Asian record; e – equalled existing record;
Records not set in finals: h – heat; sf – semifinal; r – relay 1st leg; rh – relay heat 1st leg; b – B final; † – en route to final mark; so – swim-off; tt – time trial

=== Women ===
Event	Time		Name	Club	Date	Meet	Location	Ref
50 m freestyle	27.28		Bisma Khan	Pakistan	7 December 2019	South Asian Games	Kathmandu, Nepal	
100 m freestyle	58.61		Jehanara Nabi	Chelsea and Westminster	7 November 2026	SE London Winter Championships	London, United Kingdom	
200 m freestyle	2:05.70		Jehanara Nabi	Chelsea and Westminster	7 November 2026	SE London Winter Championships	London, United Kingdom	
400 m freestyle	4:25.31		Jehanara Nabi	Pakistan	23 October 2022	Thailand Championships	Samut Prakan, Thailand	
800 m freestyle	9:09.39		Jehanara Nabi	Pakistan	21 October 2022	Thailand Championships	Samut Prakan, Thailand	
1500 m freestyle								
50m backstroke	30.37		Bisma Khan	Pakistan	19 December 2021	World Championships	Abu Dhabi, United Arab Emirates	
100m backstroke	1:08.66	r	Bisma Khan	Pakistan	25 September 2017	Asian Indoor and Martial Arts Games	Ashgabat, Turkmenistan	
200m backstroke	2:45.12	h	Fatima Lotia	Pakistan	6 December 2019	South Asian Games	Kathmandu, Nepal	
50m breaststroke	36.03	h	Lianna Swan	Pakistan	3 December 2014	World Championships	Doha, Qatar	
100m breaststroke	1:18.62	h	Lianna Swan	Pakistan	14 December 2012	World Championships	Istanbul, Turkey	
200m breaststroke	2:53.52	h	Anum Bandey	Pakistan	19 December 2010	World Championships	Dubai, United Arab Emirates	
50m butterfly	29.28		Bisma Khan	Pakistan	9 December 2019	South Asian Games	Kathmandu, Nepal	
100m butterfly	1:04.87	h	Bisma Khan	Pakistan	15 December 2018	World Championships	Hangzhou, China	
200m butterfly	2:49.14		Bisma Khan	Pakistan	8 December 2019	South Asian Games	Kathmandu, Nepal	
100m individual medley	1:07.98	h	Lianna Swan	Pakistan	4 December 2014	World Championships	Doha, Qatar	
200m individual medley	2:25.68		Jehanara Nabi	Pakistan	23 October 2022	Thailand Championships	Samut Prakan, Thailand	
400m individual medley	5:24.51	h	Anum Bandey	Pakistan	12 December 2012	World Championships	Istanbul, Turkey	
4×50m freestyle relay	1:57.17		Mishael Ayub (29.33); Ramsha Imran (30.40); Jehanara Nabi (29.89); Bisma Khan (27.55)	Pakistan	24 September 2017	Asian Indoor and Martial Arts Games	Ashgabat, Turkmenistan	
4×100m freestyle relay	4:12.17		Bisma Khan; Jehanara Nabi; Mishael Ayub; Kiran Khan	Pakistan	5 December 2019	South Asian Games	Kathmandu, Nepal	
4×200m freestyle relay	9:20.98			Pakistan	8 December 2019	South Asian Games	Kathmandu, Nepal	
4×50m medley relay	2:11.78	h	Bisma Khan (32.53); Ramsha Imran (37.90); Mishael Ayub (30.93); Jehanara Nabi (30.42)	Pakistan	22 September 2017	Asian Indoor and Martial Arts Games	Ashgabat, Turkmenistan	
4×100m medley relay	4:44.59		Kiran Khan; Mishael Ayub; Bisma Khan; Jehanara Nabi	Pakistan	9 December 2019	South Asian Games	Kathmandu, Nepal	

Legend: # – Record awaiting ratification by Pakistan Swimming Federation; WR – World record; AS – Asian record; e – equalled existing record;
Records not set in finals: h – heat; sf – semifinal; r – relay 1st leg; rh – relay heat 1st leg; b – B final; † – en route to final mark; so – swim-off; tt – time trial
