= Pakistan women's national swimming team =

National sports team

The Pakistan women's national swimming team represents Pakistan in international swimming competitions. It is administered by the Pakistan Swimming Federation (PSF). Members of the team compete at competitions including the continental and regional games (Asian and South Asian Games) and championships. Members have also participated at the Olympics with Rubab Raza the first ever female Pakistani swimmer to do so when she competed at the 2004 Games in Athens, Greece.

== History ==
Due to a ban by the Government of Pakistan, women were not allowed to compete internationally until the early 2000s. The Secretary of PSF, Veena Salman Masud petitioned the government to allow them to compete as long as they respected cultural and religious norms.

== Events ==
Pakistan has sent a team to the following competitions.

=== Championships ===
1. World Aquatics Championships: 2019

=== Games ===
1. Olympics: 2004 to date (individuals on quota places)
2. Asian Games: 2018
3. South Asian Games: 2004 to date

== Members ==
Current Members
Name	Competitions	Events
Bisma Khan	Asian Games: 2018; South Asian Games: 2019	
Kiran Khan	South Asian Games: 2010, 2016; Summer Olympics:	SAG: 50 M Backstroke (2010), 50 M Butterfly (2010)

Former Members
Name	Competitions	Events
Anum Bandey	Olympics: 2012	
Rubab Raza	Olympics: 2004	50m freestyle
Ghulam Sakina	South Asian Games: 2010	
Hoor Asrar Rauf	South Asian Games: 2010	
Eesha Khan	South Asian Games: 2010	
Lianna Swan	Asian Games: 2010; Olympics: 2016; South Asian Games: 2016	- 50m freestyle -
Rida Mitha	South Asian Games: 2010	
