= Pakistan at the 2024 World Aquatics Championships =

- Flag of Pakistan
- FINA code: PAK
- National federation: Pakistan Swimming Federation
- Website: pakswimfed.org.pk

in Doha, Qatar
- Competitors: 2 in 1 sport
- Medals: Gold 0 Silver 0 Bronze 0 Total 0

World Aquatics Championships appearances
- 1973; 1975; 1978; 1982; 1986; 1991; 1994; 1998; 2001; 2003; 2005; 2007; 2009; 2011; 2013; 2015; 2017; 2019; 2022; 2023; 2024

Pakistan competed at the 2024 World Aquatics Championships in Doha, Qatar from 2 to 18 February.

== Competitors ==
The following is the list of competitors in the Championships.

Sport	Men	Women	Total
Swimming	1	1	2
Total	1	1	2

== Swimming ==
Pakistan entered 2 swimmers.

Men

Athlete	Event	Heat		Semifinal		Final	
Athlete	Event	Time	Rank	Time	Rank	Time	Rank
Syed Muhammad Haseeb Tariq	50 metre freestyle	24.62	74	Did not advance			
Syed Muhammad Haseeb Tariq	100 metre freestyle	54.05	79	Did not advance			

Women

Athlete	Event	Heat		Semifinal		Final	
Athlete	Event	Time	Rank	Time	Rank	Time	Rank
Jehanara Nabi	100 metre freestyle	1:01.76	56	Did not advance			
Jehanara Nabi	200 metre freestyle	2:10.59	42	Did not advance			
