= Pakistan at the 2022 World Aquatics Championships =

- Flag of Pakistan
- FINA code: PAK
- National federation: Pakistan Swimming Federation
- Website: www.pakswim.com

in Budapest, Hungary
- Competitors: 4 in 1 sport
- Medals: Gold 0 Silver 0 Bronze 0 Total 0

World Aquatics Championships appearances
- 1973; 1975; 1978; 1982; 1986; 1991; 1994; 1998; 2001; 2003; 2005; 2007; 2009; 2011; 2013; 2015; 2017; 2019; 2022; 2023; 2024

Pakistan competed at the 2022 World Aquatics Championships in Budapest, Hungary from 17 June to 3 July.

== Swimming ==
Pakistan entered four swimmers.

Men

Athlete	Event	Heat		Semifinal		Final	
Athlete	Event	Time	Rank	Time	Rank	Time	Rank
Faizan Akbar	50 m backstroke	DNS		did not advance			
Faizan Akbar	100 m backstroke	DNS		did not advance			
Muhammad Siddiqui	400 m freestyle	4:18.03	40	—		did not advance	
Muhammad Siddiqui	800 m freestyle	8:57.59	30	—		did not advance	

Women

Athlete	Event	Heat		Semifinal		Final	
Athlete	Event	Time	Rank	Time	Rank	Time	Rank
Bisma Khan	50 m freestyle	28.57	61	did not advance			
Bisma Khan	100 m freestyle	1:03.72	54	did not advance			
Jehanara Nabi	200 m freestyle	2:11.13	32	did not advance			
Jehanara Nabi	400 m freestyle	4:37.93	30	—		did not advance	
