= Pakistan at the 2013 World Aquatics Championships =

- Flag of Pakistan
- FINA code: PAK
- National federation: Pakistan Swimming Federation
- Website: www.pakswim.com

in Barcelona, Spain
- Competitors: 4 in 1 sports
- Medals: Gold 0 Silver 0 Bronze 0 Total 0

World Aquatics Championships appearances
- 1973; 1975; 1978; 1982; 1986; 1991; 1994; 1998; 2001; 2003; 2005; 2007; 2009; 2011; 2013; 2015; 2017; 2019; 2022; 2023; 2024

Pakistan competed at the 2013 World Aquatics Championships in Barcelona, Spain between 19 July and 4 August 2013.

== Swimming ==
Pakistani swimmers achieved qualifying standards in the following events (up to a maximum of 2 swimmers in each event at the A-standard entry time, and 1 at the B-standard):

Men

Athlete	Event	Heat		Semifinal		Final	
Athlete	Event	Time	Rank	Time	Rank	Time	Rank
Haris Bandey	200 m freestyle	2:09.85	66	did not advance			
Haris Bandey	100 m butterfly	1:06.03	57	did not advance			
Syed Naqvi	100 m freestyle	58.40	76	did not advance			
Syed Naqvi	50 m butterfly	27.11	68	did not advance			

Women

Athlete	Event	Heat		Semifinal		Final	
Athlete	Event	Time	Rank	Time	Rank	Time	Rank
Anum Bandey	50 m breaststroke	38.50	69	did not advance			
Anum Bandey	200 m breaststroke	2:55.65	36	did not advance			
Lianna Swan	100 m breaststroke	1:19.61	54	did not advance			
Lianna Swan	200 m individual medley	2:32.61	44	did not advance			
