= Pakistan at the 2015 World Aquatics Championships =

- Flag of Pakistan
- FINA code: PAK
- National federation: Pakistan Swimming Federation
- Website: www.pakswim.com

in Kazan, Russia
- Competitors: 4 in 1 sport
- Medals: Gold 0 Silver 0 Bronze 0 Total 0

World Aquatics Championships appearances
- 1973; 1975; 1978; 1982; 1986; 1991; 1994; 1998; 2001; 2003; 2005; 2007; 2009; 2011; 2013; 2015; 2017; 2019; 2022; 2023; 2024

Pakistan competed at the 2015 World Aquatics Championships in Kazan, Russia from 24 July to 9 August 2015.

== Swimming ==
Pakistani swimmers have achieved qualifying standards in the following events (up to a maximum of 2 swimmers in each event at the A-standard entry time, and 1 at the B-standard):

Men

Athlete	Event	Heat		Semifinal		Final	
Athlete	Event	Time	Rank	Time	Rank	Time	Rank
Haris Bandey	400 m freestyle	4:31.90	67	—		did not advance	
Haris Bandey	200 m individual medley	2:22.31	47	did not advance			
Muhammad Saad	50 m freestyle	26.19	84	did not advance			
Muhammad Saad	50 m butterfly	23.75	17	did not advance			

Women

Athlete	Event	Heat		Semifinal		Final	
Athlete	Event	Time	Rank	Time	Rank	Time	Rank
Anum Bandey	100 m breaststroke	1:20.81	62	did not advance			
Anum Bandey	200 m breaststroke	2:58.10	48	did not advance			
Lianna Swan	50 m freestyle	28.66	81	did not advance			
Lianna Swan	50 m breaststroke	37.66	60	did not advance			
