= Ayub Sports Complex =

Multi-sport complex in Quetta, Pakistan

- ایوب اسپورٹس کمپلیکس
- Location: Quetta, Balochistan, Pakistan
- Owner: Government of Balochistan
- Operator: Directorate General of Sports and Youth Affairs, Balochistan

The Ayub Sports Complex is a multi-sport complex in Quetta, Balochistan, Pakistan. It is operated by the provincial Directorate General of Sports and Youth Affairs. The complex is a walled precinct containing outdoor stadiums, indoor halls and training facilities.

The principal outdoor venues are the Ayub National Stadium, which has been used for football and athletics, and the Bugti Stadium used for cricket. The wider complex also accommodates facilities for field hockey, handball, boxing, badminton, squash, tennis, table tennis, volleyball, futsal and martial arts.

== Facilities ==
=== Ayub National Stadium ===
Ayub National Stadium is the complex's main outdoor arena. Its playing field is principally used for association football, while an athletics track surrounds the field. The stadium has also staged tug of war. Historically, cricket records also identified the venue as the Baluchistan Cricket Association Ground. It hosted two One Day International matches between Pakistan and India in 1978 and 1984.

=== Bugti Stadium ===
The Bugti Stadium is part of the wider Ayub Sports Complex, and home of Quetta Gladiators.

=== Pakistan Sports Board Coaching Centre ===
The Pakistan Sports Board operates its Quetta Coaching Centre at Ayub Stadium on five acres of land leased from the Government of Balochistan in 1983. Its hostel building was completed in 1990 and its main gymnasium in 1996. The centre contains a 2,500-seat gymnasium, a smaller practice hall, squash courts, a sportsmen's hostel and an outdoor training area. The gymnasium has staged basketball, boxing and volleyball competitions.

=== Other facilities ===
Other named venues in the complex include the Saifullah Magsi Badminton Court, the Table Tennis Hall and Ibrar Hall. During the 2023 National Games, these respectively staged badminton, table tennis and wushu, while other areas of the complex hosted handball, kabaddi, squash, tennis, futsal and throwball. The complex also has two field-hockey turfs and facilities for volleyball.

A purpose-built martial-arts gymnasium was completed in 2025.

== History ==
The construction of the stadium began in March 1961 at the Race Course Ground of Quetta, and named as Ayub Stadium after president Muhammad Ayub Khan. The stadium was financed largely through public contributions. Its construction was estimated to cost between Rs300,000 and Rs500,000. The venue was designed to accommodate about 10,000 spectators. The foundation stone was laid on 3 June 1961 by Malik Amir Mohammad Khan, the governor of West Pakistan. The stadium was formally opened on 14 August 1961 by General Muhammad Musa Khan, the commander-in-chief of the Pakistan Army, as part of that year's Quetta festival. Its opening coincided with the commencement of the All-Pakistan General Mohammad Musa Hockey Tournament.

The complex developed progressively through the addition of further grounds, halls and training facilities. In 1983, the Government of Balochistan leased five acres at Ayub Stadium to the Pakistan Sports Board for the establishment of its Quetta coaching centre. A residential hostel was completed and inaugurated in April 1990, while a multipurpose gymnasium was completed and inaugurated in 1996.

The complex has served several times as a principal venue of the National Games of Pakistan. The opening ceremony of the 2004 National Games was held at the complex on 30 September, followed by competitions including the Games' athletics programme.

Preparations for another edition prompted a redevelopment programme in 2018. After several postponements, Quetta hosted the 2023 National Games in May 2023. Ayub Sports Complex was one of the event's main venue clusters. The facilities there staged athletics, badminton, basketball, boxing, football, handball, kabaddi, squash, table tennis, tennis, volleyball, wushu and tug of war, as well as the exhibition sports of futsal and throwball.

The complex also regularly hosts provincial and national competitions. The complex has also been used for public and political gatherings.

== See also ==
- Ayub National Stadium
- Bugti Stadium
- List of stadiums in Pakistan
