= Swimming at the 1993 South Asian Games =

Swimming at the 1999 South Asian Games

The swimming competition at the 1993 South Asian Federation Games in Dhaka, Bangladesh.

== Result ==
=== Men's events ===
Event	Gold		Silver		Bronze
50 m freestyle					
100 m freestyle					(Pakistan) Mohammad Maroof
200 m freestyle			(Pakistan) Mohammad Maroof	1:59.58	(Pakistan) Bilal Bukhsh
400 m freestyle	(Pakistan) Kamal Salman Masud				(Pakistan) Bilal Bukhsh
1500 m freestyle	(India) J Abhijit	16:53.85	(Pakistan) Kamal Salman Masud	17:02.54	
100 m backstroke			(Pakistan) Arshad Mehmood		(Pakistan) Liaquat Ali
200 m backstroke					(Pakistan) Arshad Mehmood
100 m breaststroke					
200 m breaststroke					
100 m butterfly					
200 m butterfly					
200 m individual medley					
400 m individual medley			(Pakistan) Kamal Salman Masud		
4×100 m freestyle relay					Pakistan
4×200 m freestyle relay	Pakistan	8:18.47			
4×100 m medley relay					
