= Swimming at the 1995 South Asian Games =

Swimming at the 1999 South Asian Games

The swimming competition at the 1995 South Asian Federation Games in Madras, India.

== Result ==
=== Men's events ===
Event	Gold		Silver		Bronze
50 m freestyle	(India) Sebastian Xavier	23.89			
100 m freestyle	(India) Sebastian Xavier	53.95			(Pakistan) Muhammad Maroof
200 m freestyle	(India) J. Abhijit	1:59.44	(Pakistan) Kamal Salman Masud		
400 m freestyle			(Pakistan) Kamal Salman Masud	4:16.00	
1500 m freestyle					(Pakistan) Akhtar Zeb
100 m backstroke					
200 m backstroke			(Pakistan) Muhammad Taz		
100 m breaststroke					
200 m breaststroke	(Bangladesh) Mohammad Mizanur Rahman	2:32.05			
100 m butterfly	(India) K. Suresh Kumar	2:07.68	(Pakistan) Kamal Salman Masud		
200 m butterfly					(Pakistan) Kamal Salman Masud
200 m individual medley	(India) J. Abhijit	2:11.27			
400 m individual medley	(India) J. Abhijit	4:42.57			
4×100 m freestyle relay			Pakistan		
4×200 m freestyle relay	India	8:10.91	Pakistan		
4×100 m medley relay					
