= Indian cricket team in Pakistan in 1984–85 =

International cricket tour

Indians in Pakistan in 1984-85
	India	Pakistan
- Dates: 14 October 1984 – 10 November 1984
Captains	Sunil Gavaskar	Imran Khan

Test series
- Result: 3-match series drawn 0–0
Most runs	Ravi Shastri (210)	Qasim Umar (256)
Most wickets	Ravi Shastri (4)	Azeem Hafeez (11)

The India national cricket team toured the Pakistan during the 1984–85 cricket season. They played three Test matches against the Pakistan cricket team; the series was drawn 0–0. The Third Test was cancelled because of the assassination of Indira Gandhi on 31 October 1984.

== Test matches ==
=== 1st Test ===
17–22 October 1984
Scorecard

Pakistan	v	India
428/9d (158 overs); Zaheer Abbas 168 (341); Ravi Shastri 3/90 (46 overs)		156 (72.5 overs); Sunil Gavaskar 48; Azeem Hafeez 6/46 (23 overs)
		371/6 (f/o) (156 overs); Mohinder Amarnath 101*; Jalaluddin 2/61 (24 overs)

Match drawn
Gaddafi Stadium, Lahore
Umpires: Khizer Hayat (Pak) and Shakoor Rana (Pak)
Player of the match: Azeem Hafeez (Pak)

- Pakistan won the toss and decided to bat.
- Chetan Sharma (Ind) made his debut in Tests.
- 20 October was a rest day.

=== 2nd Test ===
24–29 October 1984
Scorecard

India	v	Pakistan
500 (163 overs); Ravi Shastri 139 (270); Abdul Qadir 4/104 (38 overs)		674/6 (224.5 overs); Qasim Umar 210 (442); Anshuman Gaekwad 1/75 (27 overs)

Match drawn
Iqbal Stadium, Faisalabad
Umpires: Amanullah Khan, Mahboob Shah
Player of the match: Qasim Umar (Pak)

- India won the toss and decided to bat.
- Manzoor Elahi (Pak) made his debut in Tests.
- 27 October was a rest day.

=== 3rd Test ===
4–9 November 1984
scorecard

India	v	Pakistan

Match cancelled
National Stadium, Karachi

- No Toss
- Test was cancelled because of assassination of Indira Gandhi on 31 October 1984.

== One Day Internationals (ODIs) ==
Pakistan won the first match. The second match was abandoned following the assassination of Indira Gandhi and the third cancelled when the tour was called off.

=== 1st ODI ===
12 October 1984
Scorecard

Pakistan; 199/7 (40 overs)	v	India; 153 (37.1 overs)
Zaheer Abbas 55 (56); Kapil Dev 3/36 (8 overs)		SC Khanna 31 (37); Manzoor Elahi 2/18 (4 overs)

Pakistan won by 46 runs
Ayub National Stadium, Quetta
Umpires: Javed Akhtar and Khizer Hayat
Player of the match: Manzoor Elahi (PAK)

- India won the toss and elected to field.
- Manzoor Elahi (PAK) made his ODI debut.

=== 2nd ODI ===
31 October 1984
Scorecard

India; 210/3 (40 overs)	v	Pakistan
DB Vengsarkar 94* (102); Mudassar Nazar 2/27 (8 overs)

No result
Jinnah Stadium, Sialkot
Umpires: Mian Mohammad Aslam and Shakoor Rana

- Pakistan won the toss and elected to field.
- Sajid Ali (PAK) made his ODI debut.

=== 3rd ODI ===
2 November 1984
Scorecard

Pakistan	v	India

Match cancelled
Shahi Bagh Stadium, Peshawar
