= 2014 FINA World Swimming Championships (25 m) – Women's 100 metre individual medley =

Women's 100 metre individual medley at the 2014 FINA World Swimming Championships (25 m)
- Dates: 4 December (heats and semifinals); 5 December (final)
- Competitors: 62 from 46 nations
- Winning time: 56.70

Medalists
gold medal	Katinka Hosszú	Hungary
silver medal	Siobhan-Marie O'Connor	Great Britain
bronze medal	Emily Seebohm	Australia

The Women's 100 metre individual medley competition of the 2014 FINA World Swimming Championships (25 m) was held on 4 December with the heats and the semifinals and 5 December with the final.

== Records ==
Prior to the competition, the existing world and championship records were as follows.

	Name	Nation	Time	Location	Date
World record	Katinka Hosszú	Hungary	56.86	Dubai	1 September 2014
Championship record	Katinka Hosszú	Hungary	58.49	Istanbul	14 December 2012

The following records were established during the competition:

Date	Event	Name	Nation	Time	Record
4 December	Heats	Katinka Hosszú	Hungary	56.99	CR
5 December	Final	Katinka Hosszú	Hungary	56.70	WR

== Results ==
=== Heats ===
The heats were held at 11:33.

Rank	Heat	Lane	Name	Nationality	Time	Notes
1	7	4	Katinka Hosszú	Hungary	56.99	Q, CR
2	7	5	Siobhan-Marie O'Connor	Great Britain	57.98	Q
3	5	5	Amit Ivry	Israel	58.77	Q
4	7	6	Melanie Margalis	United States	58.77	Q
5	6	5	Emily Seebohm	Australia	58.78	Q
6	5	4	Alia Atkinson	Jamaica	59.16	Q
7	6	4	Rūta Meilutytė	Lithuania	59.27	Q
8	5	2	Hanna-Maria Seppälä	Finland	59.66	Q
9	5	8	Chen Xinyi	China	59.79	Q
10	7	3	Evelyn Verrasztó	Hungary	59.86	Q
11	6	3	Caitlin Leverenz	United States	59.94	Q
12	5	3	Lisa Zaiser	Austria	1:00.12	Q
13	5	6	Ganna Dzerkal	Ukraine	1:00.35	Q
13	7	7	Ellen Fullerton	Australia	1:00.35	Q
15	5	7	Lena Kreundl	Austria	1:00.41	Q
16	6	6	Vitalina Simonova	Russia	1:00.64	Q
17	6	2	Alicja Tchórz	Poland	1:00.93	
18	6	7	Louise Hansson	Sweden	1:00.98	
19	6	1	Sayaka Akase	Japan	1:01.26	
20	6	0	Sakiko Shimizu	Japan	1:01.42	
21	7	1	Viktoriia Maliutina	Russia	1:01.46	
22	5	0	Barbora Závadová	Czech Republic	1:01.54	
23	6	8	Eygló Ósk Gústafsdóttir	Iceland	1:01.55	
24	7	0	Emilia Pikkarainen	Finland	1:01.61	
25	5	1	Zhang Jiaqi	China	1:01.67	
26	1	5	Sviatlana Khakhlova	Belarus	1:01.73	
27	6	9	Mireia Belmonte	Spain	1:01.94	
28	7	9	Sanja Jovanović	Croatia	1:02.08	
29	1	3	Emily Overholt	Canada	1:02.46	
30	5	9	Mathilde Cini	France	1:02.49	
31	7	8	Alessia Polieri	Italy	1:02.51	
32	4	2	Theodora Giareni	Greece	1:02.74	
33	4	4	Chan Kin Lok	Hong Kong	1:03.37	
34	4	0	Julie Meynen	Luxembourg	1:03.76	
35	4	6	Rene Warnes	South Africa	1:04.65	
36	3	4	Sonja Adelaar	Namibia	1:04.73	
37	3	3	Antonia Roth	Namibia	1:04.79	
38	4	1	Hannah Dato	Philippines	1:04.82	
39	3	2	Karen Torrez	Bolivia	1:04.88	
40	3	6	Sezin Eligül	Turkey	1:04.98	
41	3	1	Machiko Raheem	Sri Lanka	1:06.01	
42	2	5	Lauren Hew	Cayman Islands	1:06.29	
42	3	0	Nida Üstündağ	Turkey	1:06.29	
44	4	9	Hamida Nefsi	Algeria	1:06.74	
45	3	8	Matelita Buadromo	Fiji	1:06.75	
46	3	7	Deandre Small	Barbados	1:07.71	
47	2	4	Lianna Swan	Pakistan	1:07.98	
48	3	9	Savannah Tkatchenko	Papua New Guinea	1:08.61	
49	2	2	San Su Moe Theint	Myanmar	1:09.01	
50	3	5	Amboaratiana Domoinanavalona	Madagascar	1:09.18	
51	4	5	Malavika Vishwanath	India	1:10.79	
52	4	8	Chiara Gualtieri	San Marino	1:11.36	
53	2	3	Yara Lima	Angola	1:12.09	
54	1	6	Samantha Roberts	Antigua and Barbuda	1:12.11	
55	4	3	Thalasha Prabhu	India	1:12.36	
56	2	1	Shanice Paraka	Papua New Guinea	1:13.01	
57	2	8	Catherine Mason	Tanzania	1:15.27	
58	2	7	Annie Hepler	Marshall Islands	1:15.96	
59	2	6	Diana Basho	Albania	1:17.82	
59	2	9	Seabe Ebineng	Botswana	1:17.82	
61	2	0	Angela Kendrick	Marshall Islands	1:20.89	
62	1	4	Mayra-Linda Paul	Federated States of Micronesia	1:21.07	
—	4	7	Ana Radić	Croatia		DNS
—	7	2	Katarína Listopadová	Slovakia		DNS

=== Semifinals ===
The semifinals were held at 19:16.

==== Semifinal 1 ====
Rank	Lane	Name	Nationality	Time	Notes
1	4	Siobhan-Marie O'Connor	Great Britain	57.66	Q
2	3	Alia Atkinson	Jamaica	58.66	Q
3	5	Melanie Margalis	United States	58.87	Q
4	2	Evelyn Verrasztó	Hungary	59.11	Q
5	7	Lisa Zaiser	Austria	59.76	
6	6	Hanna-Maria Seppälä	Finland	1:00.23	
7	8	Vitalina Simonova	Russia	1:00.66	
8	1	Ellen Fullerton	Australia	1:01.29	

==== Semifinal 2 ====
Rank	Lane	Name	Nationality	Time	Notes
1	4	Katinka Hosszú	Hungary	57.89	Q
2	3	Emily Seebohm	Australia	58.31	Q
3	6	Rūta Meilutytė	Lithuania	58.84	Q
4	5	Amit Ivry	Israel	58.88	Q
5	2	Chen Xinyi	China	59.49	
6	8	Lena Kreundl	Austria	1:00.05	
7	7	Caitlin Leverenz	United States	1:00.19	
8	1	Ganna Dzerkal	Ukraine	1:00.58	

=== Final ===
The final was held at 19:24.

Rank	Lane	Name	Nationality	Time	Notes
1st place, gold medalist(s)	5	Katinka Hosszú	Hungary	56.70	WR
2nd place, silver medalist(s)	4	Siobhan-Marie O'Connor	Great Britain	57.83	
3rd place, bronze medalist(s)	3	Emily Seebohm	Australia	58.19	
4	6	Alia Atkinson	Jamaica	58.58	
5	2	Rūta Meilutytė	Lithuania	58.73	
6	7	Melanie Margalis	United States	58.86	
7	1	Amit Ivry	Israel	59.17	
8	8	Evelyn Verrasztó	Hungary	59.31	
