= Ayub National Stadium =

Multi-purpose stadium in Quetta, Pakistan

- ایوب نیشنل اسٹیڈیم د ایوب ملي لوبغالی استادیوم ملی ایوب
- Interactive map of Ayub National Stadium
- Address: Pakistan
- Location: Quetta, Balochistan, Pakistan
- Coordinates: 30°12′14″N 66°59′53″E
- Capacity: 20,000

Construction
- Built: 1961
- Opened: 1961
- Renovated: 2023

Ayub National Stadium is a multi-purpose stadium in Quetta, Pakistan. It is used mostly for hosting football and athletics. Named after Ayub Khan, it was constructed in 1961 at the Race Course Ground of Quetta. The stadium has a capacity of 20,000 people.

The ground is part of the Ayub Sports Complex, which contains a football pitch, a tartan track, two halls for indoor games, a handball court, and two field hockey turfs. It is located next to the Bugti Stadium, which used for hosting cricket matches.

== History ==
The construction of the stadium began in March 1961 at the Race Course Ground of Quetta, and named as Ayub Stadium after president Muhammad Ayub Khan. The stadium was financed largely through public contributions. Its construction was estimated to cost between Rs300,000 and Rs500,000. The venue was designed to accommodate about 10,000 spectators.

The foundation stone was laid on 3 June 1961 by Malik Amir Mohammad Khan, the governor of West Pakistan. The stadium was formally opened on 14 August 1961 by General Muhammad Musa Khan, the commander-in-chief of the Pakistan Army, as part of that year's Quetta festival. Its opening coincided with the commencement of the All-Pakistan General Mohammad Musa Hockey Tournament.

The stadium has reportedly hosted two One Day International (ODI) cricket matches, one in 1978, and the other in 1984. In both of these matches, Pakistan faced India.

On 12 June 2005, it hosted the first of three friendly games in a football series between Pakistan and India, which ended in a 1–1 draw, with goals scored by Sunil Chhetri and Muhammad Essa.

The stadium subsequently hosted the 2016 and 2017 editions of the Balochistan Football Cup.

Over time, neglect and mismanagement led to the stadium falling into disrepair, mainly being used for political gatherings. The football ground lacked basic facilities, including pavilion, and it was denuded of grass. The stadium's renovation started in March 2018, for the 2019 National Games of Pakistan and generally to revive sports activities at the stadium.

In November 2021, the stadium hosted the Ufone 4G Balochistan Football Cup 2021 organised by Ufone, including the final between Muslim FC and Baloch Quetta.

It underwent another round of renovation between 2021 and 2023, for the 2023 National Games of Pakistan. It was the main venue in the event, where the Sports Complex was used for badminton, basketball, martial arts, handball, squash, tennis, volleyball, and other indoor games, and the stadium hosted athletics, football, and tug of war.

At the end of 2023, political rallies held by JUI-F, Pakistan Peoples Party and PKMAP caused millions of rupees worth of damage to the running track in the stadium and left it in urgent need of repairs.

== Cricket stats ==
Some cricket databases treat the former Baluchistan Cricket Association Ground and Ayub National Stadium as the same venue, including a match from 1952 before the foundation of the stadium. However, it is unclear whether they were the same ground.

Highest Partnership For Each Wicket in ODIs
Wicket Number	Team A	Team B	Players	Partnership	Match Date
1st. Wicket	Pakistan	India	RJ Shastri & SC Khanna	33 Runs	1984-85
2nd. Wicket	Pakistan	India	Majid Khan & Zaheer Abbas	60 Runs	1978/79
3rd. Wicket	Pakistan	India	Zaheer Abbas & Javed Miandad	74 Runs	1984-85
4th. Wicket	Pakistan	India	GR Viswanath & DB Vengsarkar	12 Runs	1978/79
5th. Wicket	Pakistan	India	DB Vengsarkar & M Amarnath	76 Runs	1978/79
6th. Wicket	Pakistan	India	Hasan Jamil & Mohsin Khan	19 Runs	1978/79
7th. Wicket	Pakistan	India	Manzoor Elahi & Mudassar Nazar	25 Runs	1984-85
8th. Wicket	Pakistan	India	Madan Lal & C Sharma	9 Runs	1984-85
9th. Wicket	Pakistan	India	Wasim Bari & Sarfraz Nawaz	27* Runs	1978/79
10th. Wicket	Pakistan	India	C Sharma & Maninder Singh	17 Runs	1984-85

First-Class Records and Statistics
Matches	Team A	Team B	Match Date	Season
1	Quetta	Pakistan Customs	20 October 1974	1974-75
2	Baluchistan Governor's XI	West Indies	12 October 1986	1986-87
3	Baluchistan Governor's XI	Australia	9 September 1988	1988-89
4	Baluchistan Governor's XI	Sri Lanka A	24 March 1989	1988-89

== See also ==
- List of stadiums in Pakistan
- List of football stadiums in Pakistan
- List of cricket grounds in Pakistan
- List of sports venues in Karachi
- List of sports venues in Lahore
- List of sports venues in Faisalabad
