= Sebastian Xavier =

Indian swimmer

Personal information
- Born: 10 February 1970 (age 56) Alappuzha, Kerala, India

Sport
- Sport: Swimming
- Strokes: Freestyle
Medal record
Men's swimming
Representing India
South Asian Games
Gold medal – first place	1991 Colombo	100 m freestyle
Gold medal – first place	1995 Madras	50 m freestyle
Gold medal – first place	1995 Madras	100 m freestyle
Gold medal – first place	1999 Kathmandu	50 m freestyle

Sebastian Xavier (born 10 February 1970) is a former Indian swimmer from Kerala.

== Career ==
He was the fastest swimmer of India for more than a decade. He held the national record of 22.89 seconds in 50 meters freestyle swimming for 11 years from 1998 to 2009 in addition to several other national records during his career. He represented India in the 1996 Olympic Games at Atlanta, in two Asian Games and in several South Asian Games (SAF) games. Sebastian won 36 gold medals at the SAF Games, SAF Championships and Asia Pacific meets and 66 gold medals in the national meets. He received the Arjuna Award in 2001.

== Personal life ==
Sebastian is married to former Indian athlete Molly Chacko and the couple works with Southern Railways.
