= Elvis Ali Hazarika =

Assamese swimmer from India

Personal information
- Full name: Elvis Ali Hazarika
- National team: India
- Born: 21 December 1981 (age 44) Assam, India

Sport
- Sport: Swimming
- Strokes: Freestyle, butterfly, individual medley
Medal record
Men's swimming
Representing India
South Asian Games
Silver medal – second place	1999 Kathmandu	50 m freestyle
Silver medal – second place	1999 Kathmandu	100 m freestyle
Bronze medal – third place	1999 Kathmandu	100 m butterfly
Bronze medal – third place	1999 Kathmandu	200 m individual medley

Elvis Ali Hazarika (born 21 December 1981) is an Indian swimmer from Assam.

Hazarika started swimming at the age of one and a half and swam across Dighalipukhuri in Guwahati at the age of four. He participated in the Asia Pacific Championship at the age of nine and represented India in the SAF Games.

In June 2018, Hazarika crossed 29 km of the English Channel in an attempt to swim across it. He is the only Assamese person to swim this distance on the channel so far.

In 2019, he announced that he was attempting to cross the Catalina Channel in the United States, connecting Santa Catalina Island and Southern California. The event was dedicated to two Assamese youths, Abhijit and Nilotpal, who were killed by miscreants in Karbi Anglong district. On 15 August of that year, he became the first person in Northeast India to swim across the channel, taking 10 hours 59 minutes along with team-mate Rimo Saha of West Bengal.
