= Hakimuddin Habibulla =

Indian swimmer

Personal information
- Full name: Hakimuddin Shabbir Habibulla
- National team: India
- Born: 25 September 1979 (age 46) Bangalore, India
- Height: 1.77 m (5 ft 10 in)
- Weight: 72 kg (159 lb)

Sport
- Sport: Swimming
- Strokes: Freestyle
Medal record
Men's swimming
Representing India
South Asian Games
Gold medal – first place	1999 Kathmandu	200 m freestyle

Hakimuddin Shabbir Habibulla (born 25 September 1979) is an Indian former swimmer, who specialized in middle-distance freestyle events. He represented India at the 2000 Summer Olympics.

== Career ==
Habibulla competed only in the men's 200 m freestyle at the 2000 Summer Olympics in Sydney. He received a Universality place from FINA in an entry time of 1:56.11. He challenged four other swimmers in heat one, including Uzbekistan's two-time Olympian Oleg Tsvetkovskiy. Coming from third at the first turn, Habibulla finished the race to a fourth seed in a time of 1:58.35, finishing behind the leader Tsvetskovskiy by 3.42 seconds. Habibulla failed to advance into the semifinals, as he placed 50th overall in the prelims.

Habibulla was co-founder of GoSports India Pvt. Ltd., a sports management company based in Bangalore, which works towards development of young talent in Olympic sports. He was also the Founder Trustee of the GoSports Foundation.

Habibulla is currently the founder and principal consultant for sports performance at Winning Matters Consulting Pvt. Ltd., a sports consulting firm.
