= 2023 National Games of Pakistan =

Multi-sport event in Pakistan

34th National Games of Pakistan
- Host city: Quetta
- Organizers: Balochistan Sports Department, Pakistan Olympic Association
- Edition: 34th
- Teams: 14
- Athletes: 6,000+ (expected)
- Events: 32 (competitive); 4 (exhibition)
- Opening: 22 May 2023
- Closing: 30 May 2023
- Opened by: Abdul Quddus Bizenjo
- Main venue: Ayub Sports Complex
- Website: https://nationalgames2023.pk/

The 2023 National Games of Pakistan was the 34th edition of the National Games of Pakistan. The event was held in Quetta, with some disciplines taking place in Islamabad, Jhelum, Karachi, and Lahore. Quetta hosted the Games for the first time since 2004, when the city hosted the 29th edition. The Balochistan Sports Department hosted the event in collaboration with the Pakistan Olympic Association.

The Games was officially opened on 22 May 2023 by Abdul Quddus Bizenjo, the Chief Minister of Balochistan. The President of Pakistan, Arif Alvi, was the chief guest of the closing ceremony on 30 May 2023.

== Schedule ==
Quetta was originally scheduled to hold the event in 2012, but could not do so due to various reasons. As a result, Peshawar was selected to host the 33rd edition of the Games in 2019. In January 2023, the Pakistan Olympic Association announced that the event was scheduled to be held in Quetta from 15 to 23 May 2023. But it was postponed for a week due to the 2023 Punjab provincial election.

== Participating teams ==
Like in the 2019 edition, 14 teams participated in the event. Seven of them represent the administrative units, while the other seven belong to various departments of Pakistan.

- Azad Kashmir
- Balochistan
- Gilgit-BaltistanGilgit-Baltistan
- Higher Education Commission
- Islamabad
- Khyber Pakhtunkhwa
- Pakistan Air Force
- Pakistan Army
- Pakistan Navy
- Pakistan Police
- Pakistan Railways
- Punjab
- Sindh
- WAPDA

== Venues ==
On 14 April 2023, the Pakistan Olympic Association announced the event schedule and venues through its website.

=== Quetta ===
- Ayub Sports Complex – Badminton, basketball, boxing, futsal, handball, kabaddi, squash, table tennis, taekwondo, tennis, throwball, volleyball, wushu
- Ayub Stadium – Athletics, football, tug of war
- Balochistan University of Information Technology, Engineering & Management Sciences – Baseball, fencing, gymnastics, judo, rugby sevens, softball
- Bolan Cricket Stadium – Women's cricket
- Boys Scout Hall – Tennis
- Brown Gymkhana Tennis Court – Tennis
- Bugti Stadium – Women's cricket
- Noori Naseer Khan Cultural Complex – Bodybuilding, weightlifting
- Qayyum Papa Stadium – Football
- Quetta Golf Club – Golf
- SBK Hall – Karate
- Shaheed Nawab Ghous Bakhsh Raisani Hockey Stadium – Field hockey
- Tameer-i-Nau College – Archery

=== Other cities ===
- Rawal lake, Islamabad – Canoeing and kayaking, rowing
- Karachi – Sailing
- Jhelum – Shooting
- Lahore – Cycling, swimming

== Sports ==
More than 6,000 athletes are expected to compete in 32 sports encompassing 57 events:

34th National Games of Pakistan Sports Programme

- Archery (2)
- Athletics (2)
- Badminton (2)
- Baseball (1)
- Basketball (2)
- Bodybuilding (1)
- Boxing (2)
- Cycling (2)
- Fencing (2)
- Field hockey (2)
- Football (2)
- Golf (2)
- Gymnastics (1)
- Handball (2)
- Judo (2)
- Kabaddi (1)
- Karate (2)
- Rowing (2)
- Rugby sevens (2)
- Sailing (2)
- Shooting (2)
- Softball (1)
- Squash (2)
- Swimming (2)
- Taekwondo (2)
- Table tennis (2)
- Tennis (2)
- Tug of war (1)
- Volleyball (2)
- Weightlifting (2)
- Wrestling (1)
- Wushu (2)

=== Exhibition sports ===
Four sports were announced as exhibition sports:

- Futsal ()
- Canoeing and kayaking ()
- Throwball ()
- Cricket ()

== Medal table ==
As of 30 May 2023

Rank	Team	Gold	Silver	Bronze	Total
1	Pakistan Army	199	133	66	398
2	WAPDA	109	101	80	290
3	Pakistan Navy	28	32	49	109
4	Pakistan Air Force	8	24	42	74
5	Higher Education Commission	8	17	93	118
6	Sindh	4	16	23	43
7	Khyber Pakhtunkhwa	4	6	39	49
8	Punjab	3	11	53	67
9	Pakistan Railways	3	8	25	36
10	Balochistan*	2	18	30	50
11	Pakistan Police	1	2	12	15
12	Islamabad	0	0	7	7
13	Azad Kashmir	0	0	0	0
13	Gilgit-Baltistan	0	0	0	0
Totals (14 entries)		369	368	519	1,256
