= Swimming at the 1999 South Asian Games =

The swimming competition at the 1999 South Asian Games in Kathmandu, Nepal.

== Result ==
=== Men's events ===
Event	Gold		Silver		Bronze	
50 m freestyle	(India) Sebastian Xavier	24.53	(India) Elvis Ali Hazarika	24.96	(Bangladesh) Kazi Monirul Islam	25.24
100 m freestyle	(India) Thankappannair Ambikadevi Sujith	54.60	(India) Elvis Ali Hazarika	55.02	(Sri Lanka) R.K.M. Jayamal Wijeratne	55.49
200 m freestyle	(India) S. Hakimuddin	1:59.08				
400 m freestyle	(India) Kailash Nath	4:20.29	(Sri Lanka) Sean Lee	4:35.27	(Sri Lanka) Eranga Jinesh Fernando	4:36.54
1500 m freestyle	(India) Kailash Nath	17:06.57	(Sri Lanka) Marlon Delano	18:09.69	(Pakistan) Luqman Munawar	
100 m backstroke	(India) T. K. Senthil Kumar	1:02.40	(India) Sachin Kakkar	1:04.67		
200 m backstroke	(India) T. K. Senthil Kumar	2:19.55	(Sri Lanka) Asaka Nradeen	2:25.13	(Pakistan) Mohammed Taz	2:25.30
100 m breaststroke	(India) Deepak Singh	1:09.03				
200 m breaststroke						
100 m butterfly	(Pakistan) Kamal Salman Masud	59.02	(Sri Lanka) Conrad Anthony Francis	59.28	(India) Elvis Ali Hazarika	59.46
200 m butterfly	(Pakistan) Kamal Salman Masud	2:10.87	(India) T. Suresh Reddy	2:14.92	(Sri Lanka) Ghefari Dulapandian	2:17.32
200 m individual medley	(India) Thankappannair Ambikadevi Sujith	2:18.40	(Pakistan) Zulfikar Ali	2:20.06	(India) Elvis Ali Hazarika	2:20.87
400 m individual medley						
4×100 m freestyle relay	India	3:39.73				
4×200 m freestyle relay	Pakistan	8:30.52	Sri Lanka	8:46.66	Nepal	10:08.38
4×100 m medley relay	India	4:04.47	Sri Lanka	4:12.55	Bangladesh	4:15.42

=== Women's events ===
Event	Gold		Silver		Bronze	
50 m freestyle	(India) Nisha Millet	28.71				
100 m freestyle	(India) Nisha Millet	1:00.40				
200 m freestyle	(India) Nisha Millet	2:12.37	(India) Shikha Tandon	2:14.87	(Sri Lanka) Radeesha Daluwatte	2:25.61
400 m freestyle	(India) Nisha Millet	4:38.29	(India) Shikha Tandon	4:38.30	(Sri Lanka) Theekshana Ratnasekera	5:12.72
800 m freestyle						
100 m backstroke	(India) Nisha Millet	1:12.12	(India) Reshma Millet	1:13.03	(Sri Lanka) Radeesha Daluwatte	1:16.61
200 m backstroke	(India) Nisha Millet	2:31.96	(Sri Lanka) Radeesha Daluwatte	2:51.06	(Bangladesh) Lamola Akhter	2:57.41
100 m breaststroke	(India) Zeba Wedia	1:19.09	(India) Shikha Tandon	1:21.23	(Bangladesh) Doli Akhter	1:26.58
200 m breaststroke	(India) Zeba Wedia	2:50.95				
100 m butterfly	(India) Richa Mishra	1:07.66	(India) Chitra Khrisna	1:09.94	(Sri Lanka) Harshini Natasha Kodituwakku	1:19.53
200 m butterfly	(India) Richa Mishra	2:34.94	(Sri Lanka) Harshini Natasha Kodituwakku	3:03.09	(Bangladesh) Sobura Khatun	3:17.57
200 m individual medley	(India) Richa Mishra	2:34.39				
400 m individual medley						
4×100 m freestyle relay	India	4:16:36	Sri Lanka		Bangladesh	
4×100 m freestyle relay	India	9:21.36				
4×100 m medley relay						
