= Pakistan at the 2019 World Aquatics Championships =

- Flag of Pakistan
- FINA code: PAK
- National federation: Pakistan Swimming Federation
- Website: www.pakswim.com

in Gwangju, South Korea
- Competitors: 3 in 1 sport
- Medals: Gold 0 Silver 0 Bronze 0 Total 0

World Aquatics Championships appearances
- 1973; 1975; 1978; 1982; 1986; 1991; 1994; 1998; 2001; 2003; 2005; 2007; 2009; 2011; 2013; 2015; 2017; 2019; 2022; 2023; 2024

Pakistan competed at the 2019 World Aquatics Championships in Gwangju, South Korea from 12 to 28 July.

== Swimming ==
Pakistan entered three swimmers.

Men

Athlete	Event	Heat		Semifinal		Final	
Athlete	Event	Time	Rank	Time	Rank	Time	Rank
Syed Tariq	100 m freestyle	53.34	86	did not advance			
Syed Tariq	100 m backstroke	59.71	55	did not advance			

Women

Athlete	Event	Heat		Semifinal		Final	
Athlete	Event	Time	Rank	Time	Rank	Time	Rank
Mishael Ayub	100 m freestyle	1:05.58	80	did not advance			
Mishael Ayub	100 m breaststroke	1:22.76	52	did not advance			
Bisma Khan	50 m freestyle	28.05	62	did not advance			
Bisma Khan	100 m butterfly	1:07.19	44	did not advance			
