= Pakistan at the 2017 World Aquatics Championships =

- Flag of Pakistan
- FINA code: PAK
- National federation: Pakistan Swimming Federation
- Website: www.pakswim.com

in Budapest, Hungary
- Competitors: 2 in 1 sport
- Medals: Gold 0 Silver 0 Bronze 0 Total 0

World Aquatics Championships appearances
- 1973; 1975; 1978; 1982; 1986; 1991; 1994; 1998; 2001; 2003; 2005; 2007; 2009; 2011; 2013; 2015; 2017; 2019; 2022; 2023; 2024

Pakistan competed at the 2017 World Aquatics Championships in Budapest, Hungary from 14 July to 30 July.

== Swimming ==
Pakistan has received a Universality invitation from FINA to send two swimmers (one man and one woman) to the World Championships.

Athlete	Event	Heat		Semifinal		Final	
Athlete	Event	Time	Rank	Time	Rank	Time	Rank
Muhammad Khan	Men's 100 m freestyle	57.53	100	did not advance			
Muhammad Khan	Men's 50 m backstroke	28.97	47	did not advance			
Mishael Ayub	Women's 50 m butterfly	30.77	48	did not advance			
Mishael Ayub	Women's 100 m butterfly	1:08.33	42	did not advance			
