= Bisma Khan =

Pakistani swimmer (born 2002)

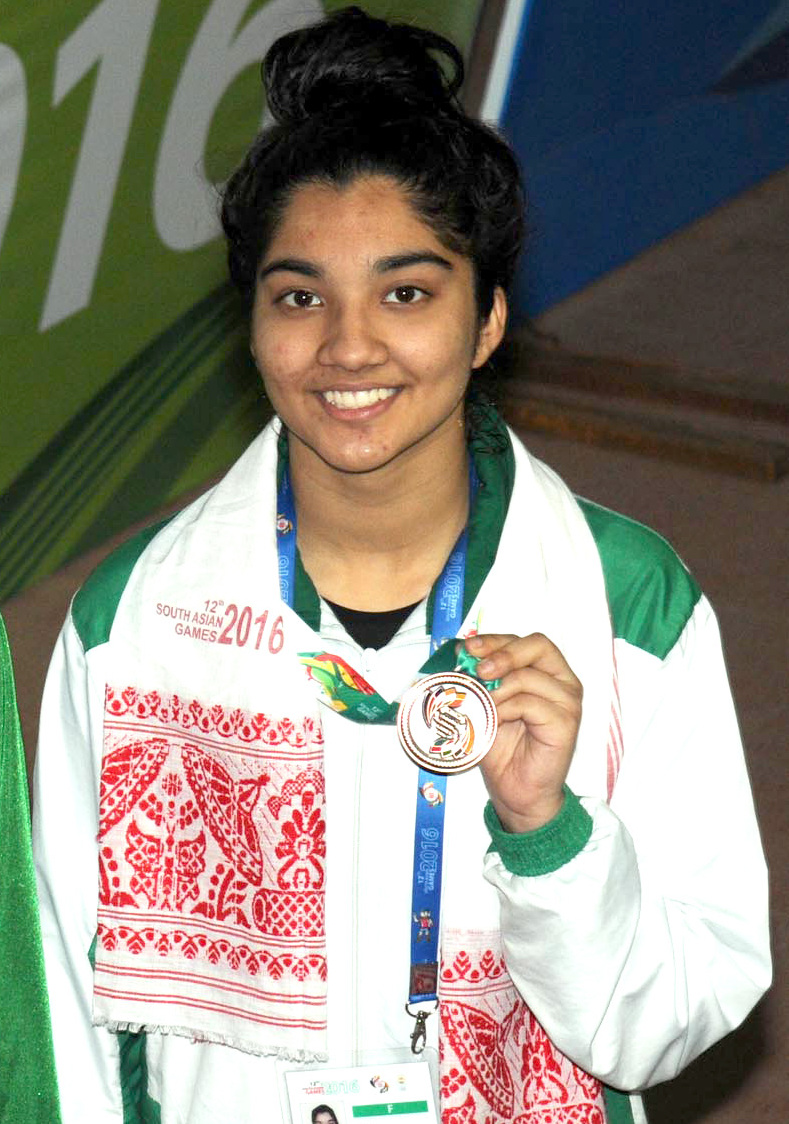

Personal information
- Born: 21 April 2002 (age 24) Lahore, Pakistan

Sport
- Sport: Swimming
Medal record
Women's swimming
Representing Pakistan
Islamic Solidarity Games
Bronze medal – third place	2017 Baku	4 × 200 m freestyle relay
South Asian Games
Silver medal – second place	2016 Guwahati	4×100 m medley
Silver medal – second place	2019 Kathmandu	200 m medley
Bronze medal – third place	2016 Guwahati	50 m backstroke
Bronze medal – third place	2016 Guwahati	4×100 m freestyle
Bronze medal – third place	2016 Guwahati	4×200 m freestyle

Bisma Khan (born 21 April 2002) is a Pakistani swimmer.

She represented Pakistan at the 2018 Asian Games held in Jakarta, Indonesia competing in six events.

In 2019, she represented Pakistan at the World Aquatics Championships held in Gwangju, South Korea competing in two events. In the same year, she won the silver medal in the women's 200 metre individual medley event at the 2019 South Asian Games held in Nepal.

In 2021, she competed in the women's 50 metre freestyle event at the 2020 Summer Olympics held in Tokyo, Japan. In 2022, she represented Pakistan at the World Aquatics Championships held in Budapest, Hungary. She competed in the women's 50 metre freestyle and women's 100 metre freestyle events.

She represented Pakistan at the 2022 Commonwealth Games in Birmingham, England.

At the 2023 National Games of Pakistan, Khan won five gold medals in individual categories and an additional three gold medals in relay events.
