= Bugti Stadium =

Cricket stadium in Quetta, Pakistan

Bugti Stadium, Quetta
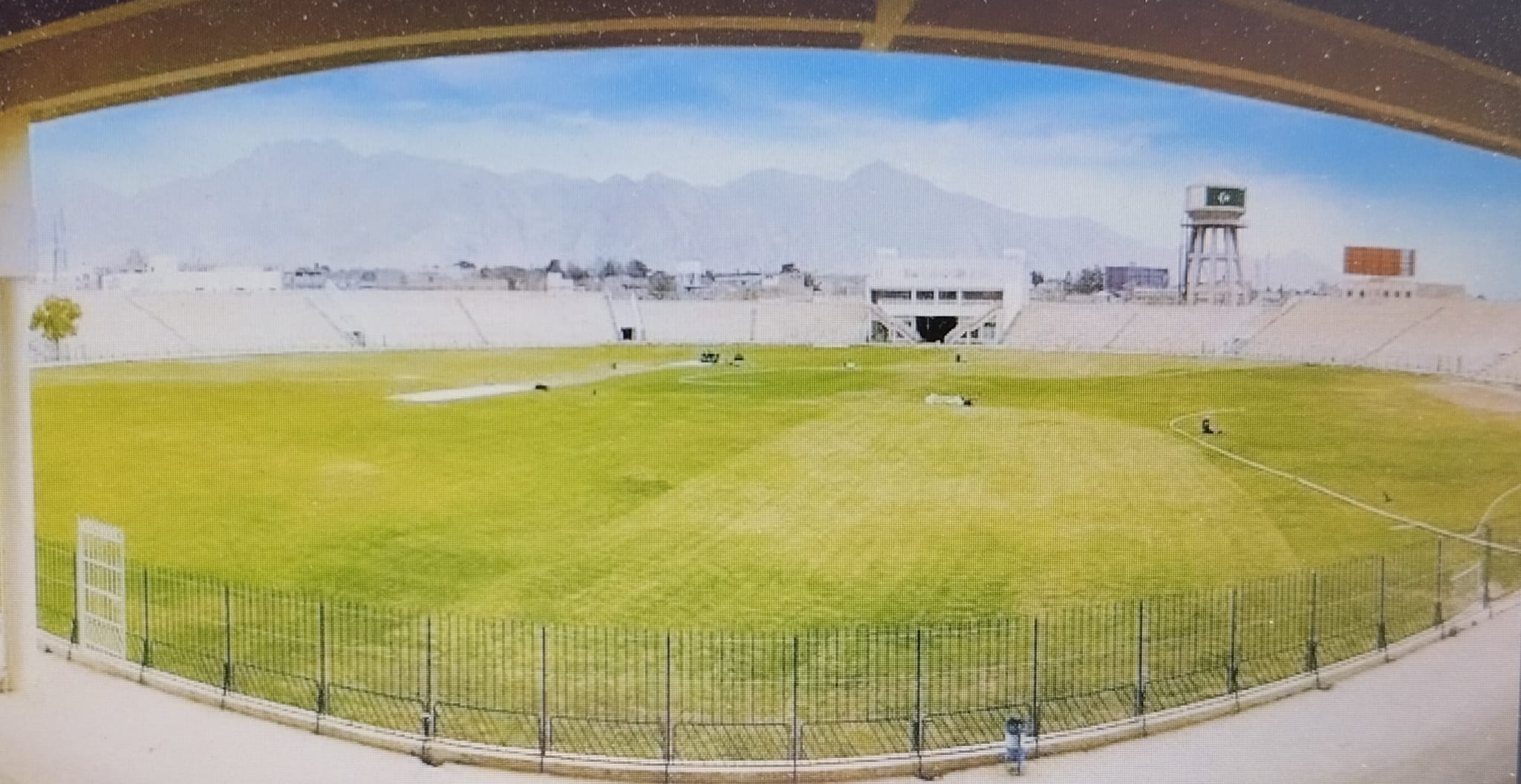
- Bugti Stadium drone view
- Interactive map of Bugti Stadium, Quetta

Ground information
- Location: Quetta, Balochistan, Pakistan
- Country: Pakistan
- Coordinates: 30°12′6″N 66°59′53″E
- Establishment: 1954; 72 years ago
- Capacity: 17,000
- Owner: Pakistan Cricket Board
- Tenants: Balochistan cricket team Quetta cricket team Pakistan national cricket team Quetta Gladiators

International information
- Only men's ODI: 30 October 1996: Pakistan v Zimbabwe

Team information
Quetta Gladiators	(2023-present)
Pakistan national cricket team	(planned)
- As of 1 January 2017; Source: Cricinfo

Bugti Stadium, formerly known as the Racecourse Ground, is a cricket ground in Quetta, Balochistan, Pakistan, owned by the Pakistan Cricket Board. It is located next to the Ayub National Stadium.

== History ==
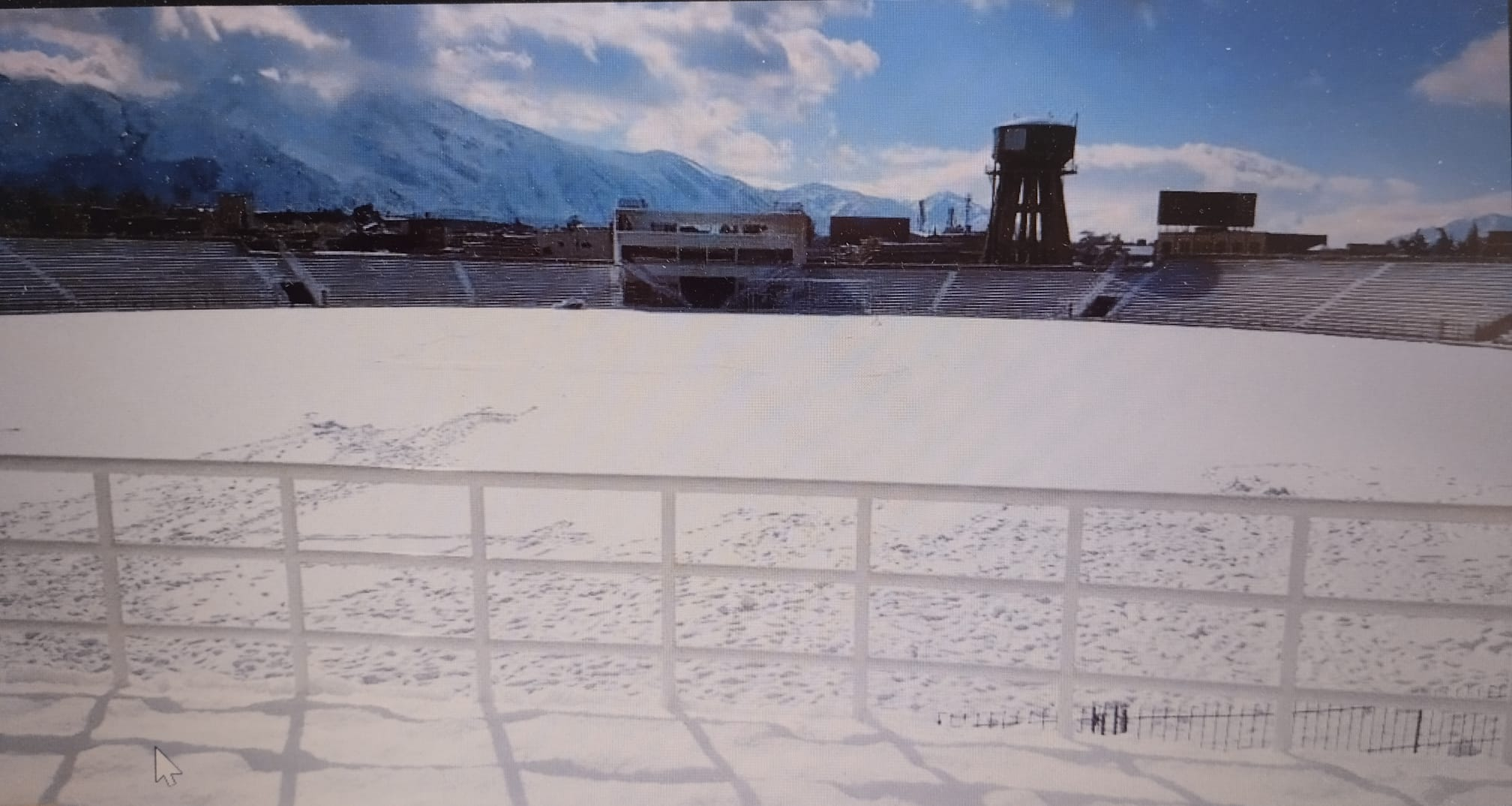
View of the stadium after snowfall.

The first recorded match on the ground was played on 29 October 1954. Until 1989, Bugti Stadium was known as the Racecourse Ground. It was used as a venue for a One Day International match between Pakistan and Zimbabwe in October 1996. Between 1954 and 2008, the ground hosted 22 first-class matches.

In September 2019, the Pakistan Cricket Board named it as one of the venues to host matches in the 2019–20 Quaid-e-Azam Trophy.

== See also ==
- List of cricket grounds in Pakistan
