= Kamal Masud =

Pakistani swimmer (born 1979)

Personal information
- Full name: Kamal Salman Masud
- National team: Pakistan
- Born: 18 May 1979 (age 47) London, England, UK
- Height: 185 cm (6 ft 1 in)
- Weight: 75 kg (165 lb)

Sport
- Sport: Swimming
Medal record
Men's Swimming
Representing Pakistan
South Asian Games
Silver medal – second place	1995 Madras	200m Freestyle
Silver medal – second place	1995 Madras	400m Freestyle
Silver medal – second place	1995 Madras	100m Butterfly
Bronze medal – third place	1995 Madras	200m Butterfly
Gold medal – first place	1999 Kathmandu	200m Butterfly
Gold medal – first place	1999 Kathmandu	100m Butterfly

Kamal Salman Masud (born 18 May 1979 in London, UK) is a former Olympic swimmer who represented Pakistan at the 1996 Atlanta Olympics and 2000 Sydney Olympics.

== Family life ==
Masud was born in London to a Pakistani father, Salman and a Trinidadian mother, Veena. At an early age, his parents decided to relocated to Pakistan. His mother is the Honorary Secretary of Pakistan Women's Swimming Association.

== Career ==
=== College ===
Masud swam collegiately for Johns Hopkins University. He graduated from Johns Hopkins University in 2001.

=== South Asian Games ===
Masud took part in the 7th edition in Madras (now Chennai), India where he won 4 individual medals in freestyle (2) and butterfly (2).

He also took part in the 8th edition where he won two gold medals for butterfly.
