= Jehanara Nabi =

Pakistani swimmer (born 2004)

Jehanara Nabi OLY
Personal information
- Nationality: Pakistani
- Born: 14 July 2004 (age 22) Lahore, Pakistan
- Education: United World College Thailand, Phuket
- Height: 173 cm (5 ft 8 in)
- Website: @jehanaranabi

Sport
- Country: Pakistan
- Sport: Swimming
- Club: UWC Thailand
- Coached by: Alexander Tikhonov
Medal record
Women's Swimming
Representing Pakistan
Islamic Solidarity Games
Bronze medal – third place	2017 Baku	4 × 200 m freestyle relay

Jehanara Nabi (Urdu: جہاں آراء نبی; born 14 July 2004) is a Pakistani swimmer who has set multiple national records. She stands as one of Pakistan’s most accomplished aquatic athletes, having represented the nation at the World Aquatics Championships in both long-course and short-course formats, Olympic Games, Commonwealth Games, Asian Games, South Asian Games and Islamic Solidarity Games. She qualified for 2024 Paris Olympics on a wild card (universality places). Nabi was the flag bearer for Pakistan alongside Arshad Nadeem at the Olympic Games Opening Ceremony.

== Achievements ==
=== Personal Bests ===
Competition	Location	Year	Event	Pool Length	Time	Medal
Thailand National Championships	Thailand	2022	Women 50 Freestyle	25m	28.35	-
Thailand National Championships	Thailand	2022	Women 100 Freestyle	25m	59.10	Bronze
16th FINA World Swimming Championships	Australia	2022	Women 200 Freestyle	25m	02:06.32	-
Thailand National Championships	Thailand	2022	Women 400 Freestyle	25m	04:25.31	Gold
Thailand National Championships	Thailand	2022	Women 800 Freestyle	25m	09:09.39	Gold
Thailand National Championships	Thailand	2022	Women 50 Butterfly	25m	32.18	-
Thailand National Championships	Thailand	2022	Women 200 Medley	25m	02:25.68	Silver
Thailand Age Group Swimming Championships	Thailand	2022	Women 50 Freestyle	50m	29.10	-
THA Age Group	Thailand	2024	Women 100 Freestyle	50m	01:00.94	-
THA Age Group	Thailand	2024	Women 200 Freestyle	50m	02:08.57	-
THA Age Group	Thailand	2024	Women 400 Freestyle	50m	04:32.71	Bronze
THA Age Group	Thailand	2024	Women 800 Freestyle	50m	09:18.33	Silver
66th MILO/MAS	Malaysia	2024	Women 1500 Freestyle	50m	18:01.98	Silver
66th MILO/MAS	Malaysia	2024	Women 50 Breaststroke	50m	37.08	-
THA Age Group	Thailand	2023	Women 200 Butterfly	50m	02:37.26	-
THA Age Group	Thailand	2024	Women 50 Butterfly	50m	31.66	-
THA Age Group	Thailand	2024	Women 200 Medley	50m	02:27.61	-
THA Age Group	Thailand	2024	Women 100 Butterfly	50m	01:08.88	-
THA Age Group	Thailand	2024	Women 400 Medley	50m	05:07.91	Gold
5th Islamic Solidarity Games	Turkey	2022	Women 4x100 Freestyle Relay	50m	04:29.95	-
5th Islamic Solidarity Games	Turkey	2022	Women 4x200 Freestyle Relay	50m	10:07.58	-
5th Islamic Solidarity Games	Turkey	2022	Women 4x100 Medley Relay	50m	04:55.09	-
16th National Women's OPEN Swimming Championships	Pakistan	2018	Mixed 4x100 Medley Relay	50m	04:30.77 NR	-

=== International Competitions ===
Competition	Event	Location	Year	Result	Rank
2017 Asian Indoor and Martial Arts Games	Women's 100m Backstroke	Ashgabat, Turkmenistan	2017	1:18.58	16
2017 Asian Indoor and Martial Arts Games	Women's 100m Individual Medley	Ashgabat, Turkmenistan	2017	1:19.39	16
2017 Asian Indoor and Martial Arts Games	Women's 50m Backstroke	Ashgabat, Turkmenistan	2017	35.18	21
2017 Asian Indoor and Martial Arts Games	Women's 4×50m Freestyle Relay	Ashgabat, Turkmenistan	2017	1:57.17	7
2017 Asian Indoor and Martial Arts Games	Women's 4×100m Freestyle Relay	Ashgabat, Turkmenistan	2017	4:21.06	7
2017 Asian Indoor and Martial Arts Games	Women's 4×100m Medley Relay	Ashgabat, Turkmenistan	2017	4:50.30	7
2017 Asian Indoor and Martial Arts Games	Women's 4×50m Medley Relay	Ashgabat, Turkmenistan	2017	2:11.78	9
2019 South Asian Games	Women's 200m Freestyle	Kathmandu, Nepal	2019	2:17.79	6
2019 South Asian Games	Women's 400m Freestyle	Kathmandu, Nepal	2019	4:45.83	4
2019 South Asian Games	Women's 800m Freestyle	Kathmandu, Nepal	2019	9:47.27	4
2019 South Asian Games	Women's 4×100m Freestyle Relay	Kathmandu, Nepal	2019	4:12.17	—
2019 South Asian Games	Women's 4×100m Medley Relay	Kathmandu, Nepal	2019	4:44.59	—
2021 FINA World Swimming Championships (25 m)	Women's 200m Freestyle	Abu Dhabi, United Arab Emirates	2021	2:08.51	42
5th Islamic Solidarity Games	Women's 100m Freestyle	Konya, Turkey	2022	1:02.06	6
5th Islamic Solidarity Games	Women's 200m Freestyle	Konya, Turkey	2022	2:14.05	8
5th Islamic Solidarity Games	Women's 400m Freestyle	Konya, Turkey	2022	4:47.61	7
5th Islamic Solidarity Games	Women's 800m Freestyle	Konya, Turkey	2022	9:39.65	5
5th Islamic Solidarity Games	Women's 4×100m Freestyle Relay	Konya, Turkey	2022	4:29.45	5
5th Islamic Solidarity Games	Women's 4×200m Freestyle Relay	Konya, Turkey	2022	10:07.58	5
5th Islamic Solidarity Games	Women's 4×100m Medley Relay	Konya, Turkey	2022	4:55.09	6
2022 Commonwealth Games	Women's 100m Freestyle	Birmingham, England	2022	1:01.51	40
2022 Commonwealth Games	Women's 200m Freestyle	Birmingham, England	2022	2:13.38	22
2022 Commonwealth Games	Women's 400m Freestyle	Birmingham, England	2022	4:36.87	17
2022 Asian Games	Women's 200m Freestyle	Hangzhou, China	2023	2:11.15	17
2022 Asian Games	Women's 200m Individual Medley	Hangzhou, China	2023	2:34.18	18
2022 Asian Games	Women's 4×100m Freestyle Relay	Hangzhou, China	2023	4:25.41	14
2022 World Aquatics Championships	Women's 400m Freestyle	Budapest, Hungary	2022	4:37.93	30
2022 World Aquatics Championships	Women's 200m Freestyle	Budapest, Hungary	2022	2:11.13	32
2022 FINA World Swimming Championships (25 m)	Women's 200m Freestyle	Melbourne, Australia	2022	2:06.32	30
2022 FINA World Swimming Championships (25 m)	Women's 400m Freestyle	Melbourne, Australia	2022	4:25.36	25
2023 World Aquatics Championships	Women's 100m Freestyle	Fukuoka, Japan	2023	1:01.39	53
2023 World Aquatics Championships	Women's 200m Freestyle	Fukuoka, Japan	2023	2:11.09	53
2024 World Aquatics Championships	Women's 200m Freestyle	Doha, Qatar	2024	2:10.59	42
2024 World Aquatics Championships	Women's 100m Freestyle	Doha, Qatar	2024	1:01.76	56
2024 World Aquatics Swimming Championships (25 m)	Women's 200m Freestyle	Budapest, Hungary	2024	2:06.27	34
2024 World Aquatics Swimming Championships (25 m)	Women's 400m Freestyle	Budapest, Hungary	2024	4:26.85	36
2024 Summer Olympics	Women's 200m Freestyle	Paris, France	2024	2:10.69	26
2025 World Aquatics Championships	Women's 200m Freestyle	Singapore	2025	2:09.88	42
2025 World Aquatics Championships	Women's 400m Freestyle	Singapore	2025	4:35.88	29
