= Syed Muhammad Haseeb Tariq =

Pakistani swimmer (born 1996)

Muhammad Haseeb Tariq
Personal information
- Full name: Syed Muhammad Haseeb Tariq
- Nickname: Haseeb
- Nationality: Pakistani
- Born: 6 April 1996 (age 30) Karachi, Pakistan

Sport
- Sport: Swimming
- Strokes: Freestyle
- Club: North York Aquatic Club
- College team: York University
Medal record
Men's swimming
Representing Pakistan
South Asian Games
Bronze medal – third place	2016 Guwahati	100 m backstroke
Bronze medal – third place	2019 Kathmandu	4 × 100 m relay medley

Syed Muhammad Haseeb Tariq (born 6 April 1996) is a Pakistani swimmer. He participated in the 2018 Commonwealth Games in the Gold Coast and the 2020 Summer Olympics in Tokyo, where he finished 62nd in the men's 100m freestyle event.
