= Pakistan Swimming Federation =

Pakistani sports governing body

- پاکستان سوئمنگ فیڈریشن
- Sport: Swimming
- Jurisdiction: National
- Membership: 17
- Abbreviation: PSF
- Founded: 1948
- Affiliation: World Aquatics
- Affiliation date: 1948
- Regional affiliation: Asia Aquatics
- Affiliation date: 1978
- Headquarters: Lahore
- Location: 246 E, Lane 8, Askari X, Lahore Cantt, Pakistan
- President: Zoraiz Lashari
- Chairman: Majid Waseem
- Secretary: Lt-Col Ahmed Ali Khan

Official website
- pakswimfed.org.pk
- (Pakistan)

The Pakistan Swimming Federation is the governing body of swimming in Pakistan. The Federation was formed in 1948 with its headquarters in Lahore. It has been a member of World Aquatics since 1948, and was one of the founding members of the Asia Aquatics in 1978.

Zoraiz Lashari currently serves as the President, with Majid Waseem as the Chairman. They were elected in December 2020 on a four-year term.

== Affiliations ==
The federation is affiliated with:

- World Aquatics
- Asia Aquatics
- Pakistan Sports Board
- Pakistan Olympic Association

== Affiliated bodies ==
The following bodies are affiliated with the federation:

1. Punjab Swimming Association
2. Sindh Swimming Association
3. Khyber Pakhtunkhwa Swimming Association
4. Balochistan Swimming Association
5. Islamabad (Federal Area) Swimming Association
6. FATA Swimming Association
7. Gilgit Baltistan Swimming Association
8. Pakistan Army
9. Pakistan Navy
10. Pakistan Air Force
11. WAPDA Sports Boards
12. Higher Education Commission
13. Pakistan Railway
14. Pakistan Women Swimming Association
15. Pakistan Aquatics Coaches Association
16. Athletes Commission
17. Individual members

== National Championship ==
The first National Swimming Championship was held in Lahore in 1951. Since then, National Championships are held annually. The swimming competitions are also a regular part of the National Games.

== See also ==
- Pakistani swimming records
