= Lianna Swan =

British-Pakistani swimmer

Personal information
- Full name: Lianna Catherine Swan
- Nationality: United Kingdom; Pakistan
- Born: 25 March 1997 (age 29) Awali, Bahrain

Sport
- Sport: Swimming
- Strokes: Breaststroke
Medal record
Women's swimming
Representing Pakistan
South Asian Games
Gold medal – first place	2016 Guwahati	200 m breaststroke
Silver medal – second place	2016 Guwahati	100 m breaststroke
Silver medal – second place	2016 Guwahati	4×100 m medley
Bronze medal – third place	2016 Guwahati	4×100 m freestyle
Bronze medal – third place	2016 Guwahati	4×200 m freestyle

Lianna Catherine Swan, OLY (born 25 March 1997 in Awali, Bahrain) is a British-Pakistani swimmer who holds seven Pakistani national records. She specialises in breaststroke. In July/August 2014, she represented Pakistan at the 2014 Commonwealth Games in Glasgow, UK. Lianna also represented Pakistan in 2016 South Asian Games in Guwahati, India. Lianna represented Pakistan at the Rio Olympics 2016 in Women's 50m freestyle.

== Background ==
Swan was born in Bahrain to a Pakistani mother, Nadia and a British father. She is a dual national of both the UK and Pakistan. She took up swimming 6 years ago when she moved to Dubai, UAE. She completed her A-Levels in Dubai at Jumeirah College.

== Career ==
=== National ===
Swan won 9 gold and 3 silver medals during the National Championships held in June 2014. This qualified her for the 2014 Commonwealth Games.

=== International ===
Swan has competed in the 2010 Asian Games; the 2011 FINA World Cup in Dubai, UAE and 2013 FINA World Aquatics Championships in Barcelona, Spain.

Swan will participate in 5 events: breaststroke - 50m & 100m; freestyle - 50m & 100m and individual medley - 200m, at the Glasgow Games in 2014. In her first event: 50m breaststroke, she broke her own national record of 00.37.11 by swimming her heat in 00.35.72 and placing third. In the 100m freestyle event on 27 July 2014, she broke her own national record of 01:03:52 by swimming her heat in 01:03:32 and placing 6th.

In February 2016, Lianna won gold medal in the women's 200m breaststroke in 2016 South Asian Games.

== National records ==
=== Freestyle ===
100m: 01:03:32 - Glasgow Commonwealth Games - 2014

=== Breaststroke ===
50m: 00:35:72 - Commonwealth Games, Glasgow, UK - 2014
100m: 01:19:61 - 15th FINA World Championships, Barcelona, Spain - July 13
200m: 02:48:86 - 12 South Asian Games - 6 Feb 2016

=== Individual Medley ===
200m: 02:32:61 - 15th FINA World Championships, Barcelona, Spain - July 13
