= Pakistan at the 2011 World Aquatics Championships =

Sporting event delegation

Flag of Pakistan

Pakistan competed at the 2011 World Aquatics Championships in Shanghai, China between July 16 and 31, 2011.

== Swimming ==
Pakistan qualified 3 swimmers.

Men

Athlete	Event	Heats		Semifinals		Final	
Athlete	Event	Time	Rank	Time	Rank	Time	Rank
Israr Hussain	Men's 50m Freestyle	27.03	80	did not advance			
Israr Hussain	Men's 100m Freestyle	57.69	83	did not advance			

Women

Athlete	Event	Heats		Semifinals		Final	
Athlete	Event	Time	Rank	Time	Rank	Time	Rank
Kiran Khan	Women's 50m Backstroke	33.18	51	did not advance			
Kiran Khan	Women's 50m Butterfly	30.50	38	did not advance			
Anum Bandey	Women's 200m Breaststroke	2:58.85	38	did not advance			
Anum Bandey	Women's 400m IM	5:37.11	36			did not advance	
