= List of hospitals in Sindh =

Hospitals located in Sindh

== Hospitals ==
=== Karachi ===
- Abbasi Shaheed Hospital
- Jinnah Postgraduate Medical Centre
- Karachi Institute of Radiotherapy and Nuclear Medicine (KIRAN)
- Lady Dufferin Hospital, Karachi
- National Institute of Cardiovascular Diseases
- PNS Shifa
- Sindh Institute of Skin Diseases
- Sindh Institute of Urology and Transplantation (SIUT)
- Dr. Ziauddin Hospitals
- Aga Khan Hospital for Women
- Nasir Hussain Shaheed Hospital
- Liaquat National Hospital
- Burhani Hospital
- Chiniot General Hospital
- Baqai Hospital
- Holy Family Hospital
- Indus Hospital
- Marie Adelaide Leprosy Centre (MALC)
- Saifee Hospital (Karachi)
- South City Hospital
- Aga Khan University Hospital
- Koohi Goath Hospital
- PNS Rahat Hospital
- Dr. Ruth K. M. Pfau Civil Hospital Karachi

=== Hyderabad ===
- The Aga Khan Maternal and Child Care Centre, Hyderabad
- Liaquat University Hospital, Hyderabad/Jamshoro
- NIMRA Cancer Hospital
- National Institute of Cardiovascular Diseases (NICVD)
- Sir Cowasjee Jehangir Institute of Psychiatry
- St. Elizabeth's Hospital
- Sindh Institute of Ophthalmology & Visual Sciences (SIOVS), Hyderabad
- Government Skin Hospital
- Isra University Hospital
- Wapda Hospital
- Boulevard Hospital
- G.G Jaghrani Hospital, Hirabad, Hyderabad
- Lady Diferal American hospital
- Maa Jee Hospital
- Jeejal Maa Hospital
- Sindh Government Hospital
- Bone Care Center
- Afzal Junejo Hospital

=== Sukkur ===
- Ghulam Muhammad Mahar Medical College teaching Hospital
- National Institute of Cardiovascular Diseases (NICVD), Sukkur chapter
- SIUT Sukkur- Chablani Medical Center
- Child Healthcare Institute Sukkur
- Wapda Hospital
- Al-Shifa Trust Eye Hospital
- Sindh Rangers Hospital Sukkur
- Red Crescent Hospital
- Sindh Government Anwar Paracha Teaching Hospital Sukkur
- Railway Hospital

=== Larkana ===
- Civil Hospital, Larkana
- Chandka Medical College Hospital
- Chandka Children Hospital
- Chandka Eye Hospital
- NICVD Larkana Satellite center
- Larkana Institute of Nuclear Medicine & Radiotherapy (Linar)
- SIUT Larkana Center
- Sheikh Zaid Women Hospital

=== Benazirabad ===
- People's Medical University Hospital, Nawabshah
- Nuclear Medicine Oncology & Radiotherapy Institute Nawabshah (NORIN) Shaheed Benazirabad
- Maternity And Child Health Care Institute Benazirabad Nawabshah
- Benazir Institute Urology and Transplantation Hospital (BUIT) Shaheed Benazirabad
- National Institute of Cardiovascular Diseases (NICVD), Nawabshah
- ERWO Eyes Hospital Nawabshah
- Sakrand Taluka Hospital, Shaheed Benazirabad
- Taluka Hospital Kazi Ahmed
- Taluka Hospital Daur
- Railway Hospital Nawabshah
- Mastoi Bone & Joint Hospital Nawabshah
- City Care Hospital Nawabshah

=== Khairpur ===
- Khairpur Medical College Hospital
- Pir Abdul Qadir Shah Jeelani Institute of Medical Sciences Gambat
- Gambat Liver Transplant Center

=== Jamshoro ===
- Nuclear Institute of Medical Radiotherapy (NIMRA)

=== Kotri ===
- Bilawal Medical College Hospital, Kotri

=== Jacobabad ===
- Jacobabad Institute of Medical Sciences (JIMS), Jacobabad
- Civil hospital Jacobabad

=== Other cities ===
- Civil Hospital Dadu
- Civil Hospital Lumhs Jamshoro
- Civil Hospital (DHQ) Kashmore
- Civil Hospital Ghotki
- Mother And Child Health Care Hospital Kandhkot, Kashmore
- Civil Hospital Mirpurkhas
- Sant NenuRam Chairitable Hospital Islamkot Tharparkar
- Civil Hospital (DHQ) Mithi, Tharparkar
- Civil Hospital Chachro, Tharparkar
- Civil Hospital Umerkot
- Civil Hospital (DHQ) Sanghar
- MS RBUT Hospital Shikarpur
- Mother and Child Health Care Mini Hospital Chundiko, Nara
- Gambat Institute of Medical Sciences (GIMS) Hospital, Gambat
  - Gambat Liver Transplant Unit
