= List of hospitals in Pakistan =

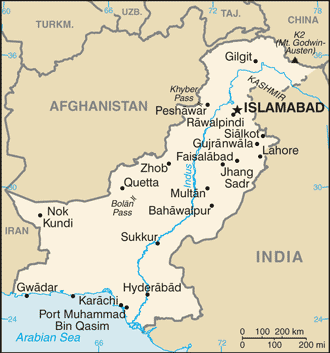

List of hospitals in Pakistan shows the hospitals in Pakistan by administrative region and city with links to articles in Wikipedia on notable hospitals.

According to 2016 statistics, Pakistan has more than 1200 public hospitals and 700 private hospitals. Besides these hospitals, there are also small Medical Clinics plus Maternity & Child Health Centers in different areas of Pakistan. The fees of public hospitals are marginal and affordable for all. However, private hospitals are expensive. All the doctors who are providing their services are certified and they all have a legal licence from Pakistan Medical & Dental Council (PMDC) to practice this profession.

During the COVID-19 pandemic, hospitals in Pakistan take all the necessary measures and tackle the pandemic very effectively. The sections below show list of some of the hospitals by administrative region of Pakistan with links to notable hospitals that have articles in Wikipedia.

== Punjab ==
Punjab is the most populated and industrialised province of Pakistan. It has almost 58 cities. Some of the most notable public and private hospitals in a few cities of Punjab are mentioned below.

=== Lahore ===
The following are some of the hospitals in Lahore:

==== Public ====
- Mayo Hospital, Lahore
- Pakistan Kidney and Liver Institute
- Services Hospital Lahore
- Lahore General Hospital
- Jinnah Hospital
- Institute of Nuclear Medicine & Oncology Lahore (INMOL)
- Cancer Care Hospital & Research Center
- Centre for Nuclear Medicine (CENUM), Lahore
- Sir Ganga Ram Hospital
- United Christian Hospital, Lahore
- Lady Willingdon Hospital
- Lady Aitchison Hospital
- Children Hospital, Lahore
- Combined Military Hospital Lahore
- Punjab Institute of Cardiology
- Punjab Social Security Hospital
- Punjab Institute of Mental Health

==== Semi-private ====
- Shaikh Zayed Hospital
- Gulab Devi Chest Hospital
- Data Darbar Hospital

==== Private ====
- Shaukat Khanum Memorial Cancer Hospital and Research Centre
- Doctors Hospital
- Ittefaq Hospital (Trust)
- Shalamar Hospital
- Surgimed Hospital
- Farooq Hospital
- Fatima Memorial Hospital
- Indus Hospital, Lahore
- Iqraa Medical Complex, Lahore
- Lahore Care Hospital
- Model Town Hospital
- Hameed Latif Hospital
- Social Security Hospital KLP, Lahore
- Masood Hospital, Garden Town Lahore
- Horizon Hospital Lahore
- National Hospital & Medical Centre, Lahore
- Medix Hospital, Lahore
- Family Health Hospital, Johar Town Lahore
- Aadil Hospital
- Saira Memorial Hospital
- Alam Hospital
- Ihsan Mumtaz Hospital
- Shadman General Hospital
- Ammar Medical Complex
- Wazir Hospital
- Health City Hospital
- Orthopaedic Hospital & Medical Complex
- Noble Hospital
- Nawaz Sharif Social Security Hospital
- Mumtaz Baktawar Hospital
- Lahore Health Care
- Bahria International Hospital
- Health Care Hospital
- Khawaja Hospital
- Naeem Hospital (South Campus) Defence Road Mohlanwal
- Roshaan Hospital
- Zahid Welfare Hospital
- City Hospital, Lahore
- Society Hospital, Nabipura Lahore
- Zarar Shaheed Trust Hospital
- City Hospital, Institute of Mother & Child Health Lahore
- Pak Hospital, Ichhra Lahore
- Noor Hospital
- Zafar Hospital, Lahore

=== Rawalpindi ===
The following are some of the hospitals in Rawalpindi, Pakistan:

- Rawalpindi International Hospital
- Armed Forces Institute of Cardiology
- Armed Forces Institute of Pathology (Pakistan)
- Benazir Bhutto Hospital
- Combined Military Hospital Rawalpindi
- Military Hospital Rawalpindi
- Rawalpindi Institute of Cardiology
- St Joseph's Hospice, Rawalpindi
- Holy Family Hospital, Rawalpindi
- Al-Shifa Trust Eye Hospital
- Fauji Foundation Hospital, Rawalpindi
- Railway General Hospital Rawalpindi

=== Multan ===
The following are some of the hospitals in Multan, Pakistan:

- Children Hospital Multan
- Multan Institute of Cardiology
- Nishtar Hospital
- Railway Hospital Multan
- Women's Christian Hospital, Multan

=== Dera Ghazi Khan ===
The following are some of the hospitals in D.G.Khan, Pakistan:

- Children Hospital, D.G.Khan
- Sardar Fateh Muhammad Khan Buzdar Institute of Cardiology, Dera Ghazi Khan
- DHQ Hospital, Dera Ghazi Khan
- Women's Hospital, D.G.Khan

=== Faisalabad ===
The following are some of the public and private hospitals in Faisalabad, Pakistan:

- St. Raphael's Hospital
- Allied Hospital, Faisalabad
- DHQ Hospital Faisalabad
- Faisalabad Institute of Cardiology
- Institute of Dentistry, Faisalabad
- Govt. General Hospital G.M.Abad
- Govt. General Hospital Samanabad
- Govt. General Hospital 224 R.B.
- Shifa International Hospital Faisalabad
- Children Hospital Faisalabad
- Aziz Fatima Hospital, Faisalabad
- Wapda Hospital, Faisalabad
- The National Hospital Faisalabad
- Saahil Hospital Faisalabad
- Faisalabad International Hospital, Canal Road.
- Madina Teaching Hospital, Sargodha Road, Faisalabad.
- Abwa Hospital Faisalabad.

=== Other hospitals ===
- Bahawal Victoria Hospital, Bahawalpur
- Jubilee women Hospital, Bahawalpur
- Rehmat General Hospital, Rahim Yar Khan
- Central Hospital, Gujranwala
- Cival Hospital, Gujranwala
- Civil Hospital, Bahawalpur
- Bethania Hospital Sialkot
- Fazl-e-Omar Hospital
- Recep Tayyip Erdoğan Hospital, Muzaffargarh
- Sialkot Mission Hospital
- Wali Hospital Kasur

== Sindh ==
Sindh is the second-most populous province of Pakistan. Karachi is the main city of this province. It has many public and private hospitals that are providing medical services to the people of Sindh.

=== Karachi ===
The following are some of the public and private hospitals in Karachi, Pakistan:

- Abbassi Shaheed Hospital
- Aga Khan Hospital for Women
- Aga Khan University Hospital
- Burhani Hospital
- Dr. Ruth K. M. Pfau Civil Hospital Karachi
- Dr. Ziauddin Hospital
- Health Oriented Preventive Education
- Holy Family Hospital, Karachi
- Lady Dufferin Hospital
- Liaquat National Hospital
- Marie Adelaide Leprosy Centre, Karachi
- P.N.S. Rahat
- P.N.S. Shifa
- Jinnah Postgraduate Medical Centre (JPMC)
- National Institute of Cardiovascular Diseases (NICVD)
- Sindh Institute of Urology and Transplantation (SIUT)
- Karachi Institute of Radiotherapy and Nuclear Medicine
- Sindh Institute of Skin Diseases
- Indus Hospital, Karachi
- Saifee Hospital, Karachi, Karachi
- Patel Hospital, Karachi
- South City Hospital, Clifton, Karachi
- Hasan Suleman Memorial Hospital, Karachi
- Pakistan Steel Hospital, Karachi
- Combined Military Hospital, Karachi
- Dow University Hospital
- Tabba Heart Institute
- The Modern Hospital, Karachi

=== Hyderabad ===
The following are some of the public and private hospitals in Hyderabad, Pakistan:

- Liaquat University Hospital
- The Aga Khan Maternal and Child Care Centre
- St. Elizabeth’s Hospital, Hyderabad

=== Kotri ===
- Bilawal Medical College Hospital, Kotri

=== Sukkur ===
- Civil Hospital Sukkur
- Pir Abdul Qadir Ali Shah Jillani Institute of Medical Sciences, Gambat (GIMS)

=== Larkana ===
- Civil Hospital, Larkana
- Larkana Institute of Nuclear Medicine and Radiotherapy (LINAR)
- Chandka Medical College Hospital, Larkana

=== Benazirabad (former name Nawabshah city) ===
- Civil Hospital Nawabshah
- Benazir Institute Urology and Transplantation, Benazirabad
- Nuclear Medicine Oncology & Radiotherapy Institute Nawabshah
- Maternity And Child Health Care Institute Benazirabad, Benazirabad

=== Other Hospitals ===
- Gambat Liver Transplant Center

== Khyber Pakhtunkhwa ==
Khyber Pakhtunkhwa also known as KPK has well-developed hospitals, including the following.

=== Peshawar ===
Peshawar has the following notable hospitals.

- Hayatabad Medical Complex
- Khyber Teaching Hospital, Peshawar
- Lady Reading Hospital, Peshawar
- Shaukat Khanum Memorial Cancer Hospital & Research Centre
- Institute of Radiotherapy and Nuclear Medicine (IRNUM), Peshawar
- Peshawar Institute of Cardiology
- Rehman Medical Institute, Peshawar
- North West General Hospital & Research Centre
- Peshawar General Hospital
- Peshawar Institute of Medical Sciences

=== Abbottabad ===
- Ayub Teaching Hospital
- Institute of Nuclear Medicine, Oncology and Radiotherapy (INOR)
- Abbottabad Medical Complex

=== Swat ===
- Miangul Abdul Haq Jahanzeb Kidney Hospital
- Saidu Teaching Hospital, Swat
- Swat Institute of Nuclear Medicine Oncology & Radiotherapy (SINOR)
- Luqman International Hospital

=== Bannu ===
- Khalifa Gul Nawaz Teaching Hospital
- Bannu Institute of Nuclear Medicine Oncology and Radiotherapy (BINOR)
- DHQ Hospital Bannu
- Women and Children Hospital

=== Dera Ismail Khan ===
- DHQ Hospital Dera Ismail Khan
- D.I Khan Institute of Nuclear Medicine and Radiotherapy (DINAR)
- Mufti Mehmood Memorial Teaching Hospital

=== Other hospitals ===
- Bacha Khan Medical Complex Swabi
- Mardan Medical Complex
- DHQ Hospital Charsadda
- DHQ Hospital Khar, Bajaur
- DHQ Hospital Kohat
- DHQ Hospital Nowshera
- DHQ Hospital Swabi
- King Abdullah Teaching Hospital, Mansehra
- Qazi Hussain Ahmed Medical Complex, Nowshera

== Balochistan ==
Balochistan is the fourth most populous province of Pakistan. Hospitals in Balochistan include those listed below by city:

=== Quetta ===
Following are some of the hospitals located in Quetta:

- Civil Hospital, Quetta
- Sheikh Zayad Hospital Quetta
- Bolan Medical College Hospital Quetta
- Yaseen Hospital

=== Gwadar ===
- Pak–China Friendship Hospital, Gwadar
- GDA Hospital Gwadar
- Civil Hospital Gwadar

=== Hub ===
- Baluchistan Social Security Hospital Hub
- Jam Ghulam Qadir Civil Hospital Hub

=== Other ===
- DHQ Hospital Awaran
- DHQ Hospital Kharan
- DHQ Hospital Khuzdar
- DHQ Hospital Lasbela
- DHQ Hospital Panjgur
- DHQ Hospital Washuk
- Kech Hospital Turbat

== Gilgit-Baltistan ==
The following hospital is located in Gilgit-Baltistan:

- DHQ Hospital Gilgit

== Islamabad Capital Territory ==
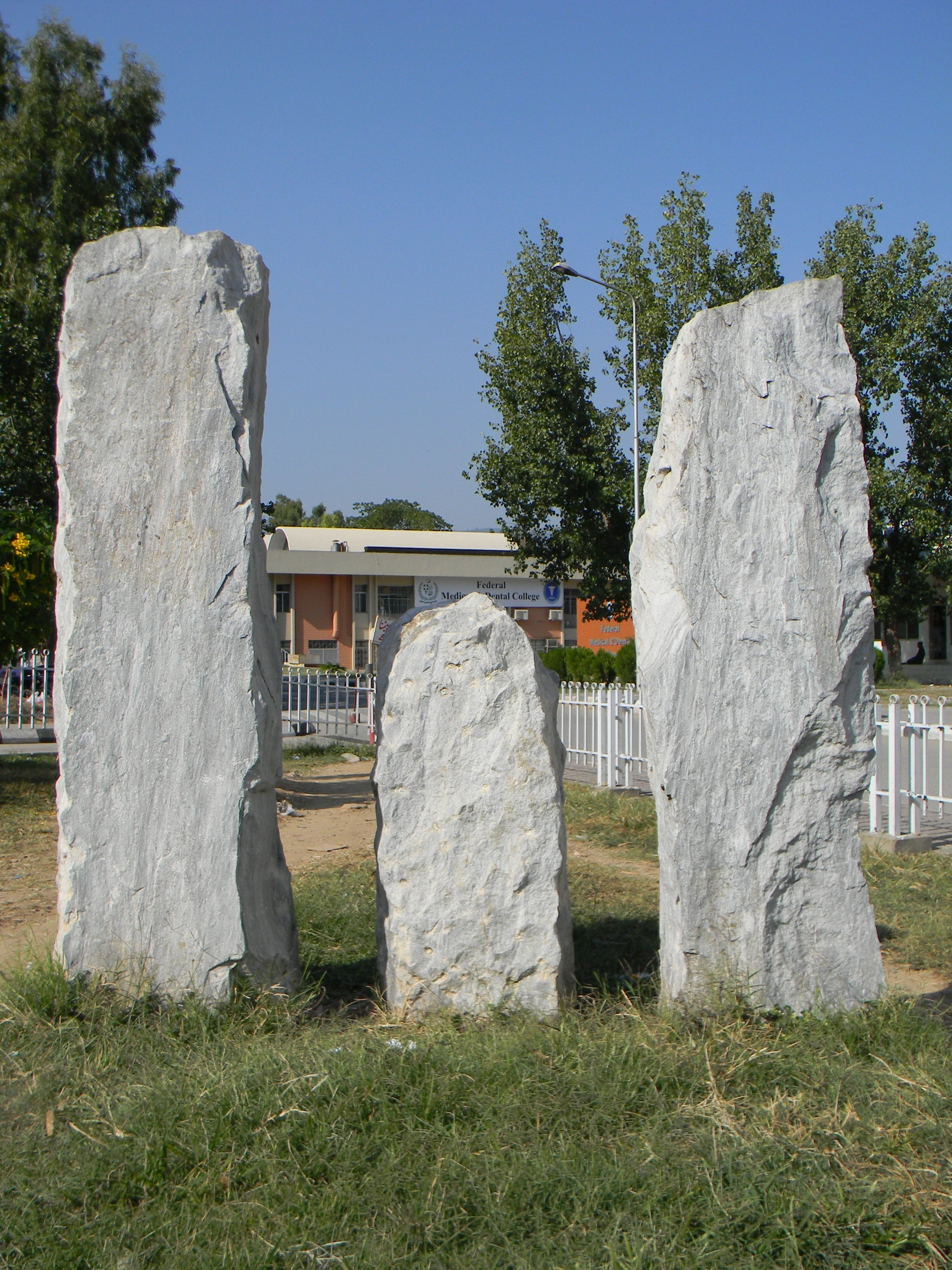
"Tabber" monument at the Pakistan Institute of Medical Sciences in Islamabad.

The following hospitals are located in the Islamabad Capital Territory:

- National Institute of Health (Pakistan)
- Nuclear Oncology and Radiotherapy Institute (NORI)
- Pakistan Institute of Medical Sciences (PIMS) Hospital, Islamabad
- Shifa International Hospitals (SIHL)
- Quaid-e-Azam International Hospital
- Advanced International Hospital
- Kulsum International Hospital
- Maroof International Hospital
- Ali Medical Centre
- Medicsi
- Amanat Eye Hospital
- Capital Development Authority International Hospital, Islamabad
- KRL Hospital
- The Diabetes Centre
- PAF Hospital
- Maxhealth Hospital
- National Police Hospital (Pakistan)
- Pakistan Atomic Energy Commission General Hospital, Islamabad
- Federal Government Services Hospital (Polyclinic), Islamabad
- PNS Hafeez
- NESCOM Hospital
- Islamabad International Hospital and Research Centre
- IHS Children & Family Hospital

== Azad Jammu and Kashmir (AJK) ==
The following hospitals are in Azad Jammu and Kashmir:

- CMH Muzaffarabad
- Abbas Institute of Medical Sciences

== See also ==
- List of cancer hospitals in Pakistan
