= ChildLife Foundation =

Non-governmental organization in Pakistan

ChildLife Foundation is a Pakistani non-governmental organization that operates pediatric emergency rooms and a telemedicine network in public hospitals across Pakistan. It is headquartered in Karachi.

== History ==
ChildLife Foundation was founded in Karachi in 2010. Its formation followed the 2010 Pakistan floods and a growing concern about deteriorating conditions in the pediatric ward at Civil Hospital Karachi. ChildLife began its work with the Government of Sindh and opened its first modernized 22-bed pediatric emergency room at Civil Hospital Karachi in 2010.

In 2012, ChildLife formed a joint initiative with the SINA Health, Education and Welfare Trust to operate primary care clinics in low-income areas of Karachi. In 2013, ChildLife began managing the pediatric emergency room at the National Institute of Child Health in Karachi.

Between 2018 and 2020, ChildLife expanded across Sindh and into Balochistan, opening emergency rooms at Peoples Medical College Hospital in Nawabshah, Chandka Medical College Hospital in Larkana, Ghulam Muhammad Mahar Medical College Hospital in Sukkur, Liaquat University of Medical and Health Sciences in Hyderabad, and Sandeman Provincial Hospital in Quetta.

In 2022, ChildLife expanded into Punjab with a pediatric emergency room at Mayo Hospital in Lahore and later began operating an emergency room at the Pakistan Institute of Medical Sciences in Islamabad.

In 2023, ChildLife opened a 100-bed pediatric emergency room at the Children Hospital Multan. It later added an emergency room at Sindh Government Hospital in New Karachi.

ChildLife was named a finalist in the health category at COP28 in Dubai in 2023. During fiscal year 2024–25, more than one million children in Sindh received treatment through its facilities operated with the provincial governments.

In 2026, the Skoll Foundation named ChildLife one of three recipients of the Skoll Award for Social Innovation. The award included an unrestricted grant of US$2 million and was presented at the 23rd Skoll World Forum in Oxford.

In 2026, ChildLife launched a second 15-bed pediatric emergency room in Balochistan, located at the Teaching Hospital, Loralai.

== Operations ==
ChildLife operates pediatric emergency rooms in government-owned hospitals through public–private partnerships. Under this model, ChildLife manages staffing, equipment, and emergency-room operations, while the hospitals remain under public ownership. Its telemedicine network connects hospitals in remote areas with pediatricians at central hubs.

As of 2026, ChildLife manages 15 modernized pediatric emergency rooms and more than 340 Telemedicine Satellite Centers in secondary care hospitals across Sindh, Balochistan, Punjab, and Northern Pakistan. Its network treats approximately two million children annually.
