= Sindh Institute of Cardiovascular Diseases, Sukkur Chapter =

Pakistani health organisation

Sindh Institute of Cardiovascular Diseases سنده انسٹيٹيوٹ آف كارڈيو ويسكيولر ڈيزيزز
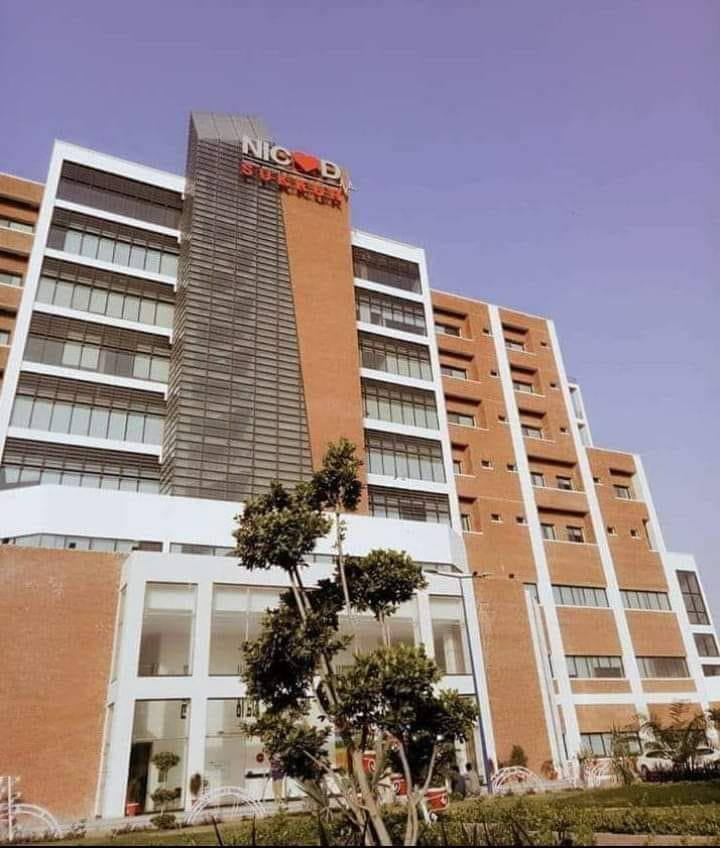
- NICVD Sukkur Satellite Center
- Type: Public
- Established: 2018
- Location: Sindh, Pakistan
- Website: nicvd.org

Sindh Institute of Cardio Vascular Diseases (SICVD) was first established as NICVD Satellite Center Sukkur on 24 February 2018. This 300 bed state-of-the-art cardiac facility in Sukkur has full facilities as are available in the National Institute of Cardiovascular Diseases, Karachi. In SICVD all the cardiac care services are provided free-of-charge. It is a cardiac hospital of international standard, providing free cardiac services, including interventional cardiology, for the residents of the province. It is the second largest cardiac centre in Sindh, after the NICVD in Karachi.

== Facilities ==
This hospital is another milestone to serve the population of northern Sindh and adjoining areas of south Punjab and Balochistan with modern and well-equipped Emergency, Cath Lab, CCU and Consulting Clinics will provide quality treatment, advanced diagnosis, 24×7 cardiac emergency facilities, adult and paediatric cardiology, echocardiography services, coronary artery angioplasty and angiographies 100% free of cost, by internationally and local trained cardiologists, paramedical staff and technicians.

=== Adult heart Surgery ===
The Sukkur satellite center of National Institute of Cardiovascular Diseases (NICVD), performed its first open heart surgery under the supervision of Prof. Fazle Rabbi on 18 March 2018. The surgery involved atrial septal defect (ASD) closure on a female patient, and was followed by two more open heart surgeries.

=== Paediatric heart surgery ===
A two-member team of the Paeds cardiac surgery department at the National Institute of Cardiovascular Diseases (NICVD), Sukkur, on Thursday 19 March 2020 successfully performed the open-heart surgery procedure on a five-year-old child.successfully performed the open-heart surgery procedure on a five-year-old child.

Almost one year later, for the first time an atrial septal defect (hole in heart) surgery has been performed through device instead of open heart surgery successfully by Paediatric Cardiology team at NICVD Sukkur.

=== Modern labs ===
On the first anniversary of NICVD Sukkur an electrophysiology lab and the second Cath Lab (catheterization lab) was inaugurated on Thursday 4 February 2019. The lab would serve a larger number of patients requiring pacemaker and other implants and angioplasties from northern Sindh, southern Punjab and Balochistan. The NICVD Sukkur, he said has now become one of the best cardiac-care hospitals in the region where patients get quality treatment free of cost.

== Recognition ==
- Accredited by the College of Physicians and Surgeons of Pakistan.
