= Jinnah Sindh Medical University =

Medical university in Karachi, Pakistan

Jinnah Sindh Medical University جامع طبی جناح سنڌ
- Motto: Knowledge, Service, Character
- Type: public university
- Established: Sindh Medical College established on 7 April 1973. Gained university status in June 2012
- Affiliations: Higher Education Commission (Pakistan); University Grants Commission (Pakistan)
- Chancellor: Kamran Tessori (Governor of Sindh)
- Vice-Chancellor: Amjad Siraj Memon
- Location: Karachi, Sindh, Pakistan; 24°51′03″N 67°02′44″E
- Website: Jinnah Sindh Medical University's Official Website

Jinnah Sindh Medical University, formerly known as Sindh Medical College, is a medical university in Karachi, Sindh, Pakistan. It gained university status in June 2012. It currently has 11 constituent institutes and 35 Affiliated institutes.

== History ==
Jinnah Sindh Medical University, formerly known as Sindh Medical College, started on April 7, 1973 after approval of a committee constituted by the Government of Sindh. Approximately 200 students were admitted to their first year of a MBBS in 1973. Khawaja Moin Ahmed was appointed as the first principal of the college. The college initially began working in the pediatrics ward of the Jinnah Postgraduate Medical Centre, which had been the army barracks since 1865 and was given to the Jinnah Postgraduate Medical Centre in 1959.

== Affiliations ==
The university is fully accredited by the Higher Education Commission and the University Grants Commission (Pakistan).

The university is also associated with other medical institutions such as the Jinnah Postgraduate Medical Centre, the National Institute of Child Health and the National Institute of Cardiovascular Diseases.

== Mergers ==
In 2003, Sindh Medical College became a part of the Dow University of Health Sciences. It also shares the curriculum, faculty, and other certain resources with the other affiliated institutions of DUHS, such as DMC (Dow Medical College) and Dow International Medical College. Later in 2010, it merged with Jinnah Postgraduate Medical Centre

== Granted university status ==
The Sindh Medical College achieved university status on June 2, 2012, and thus became third medical university in Karachi, with the ordinance signed by the Governor Sindh, Ishrat-ul-Ebad Khan, and witnessed by President Asif Ali Zardari at Bilawal House.

The current Vice Chancellor is Amjad Siraj Memon.

== Notable alumni ==
The list of notable graduates of the Sindh Medical College (and later university) includes:

- Shahid Masood
- Khalid Maqbool Siddiqui
- Arbab Ghulam Rahim (Former Chief Minister Sindh)
- Imran Farooq (Pakistani politician)
- Farooq Sattar (Pakistani politician)
- Shaista Wahidi (TV personality in Pakistan)
- Asim Shahmalak (British hair transplant surgeon and broadcaster)
- Ashok Kumar, Politician

== See also ==
- Dow University of Health Sciences
- List of medical schools in Pakistan
