= Quaid-e-Azam International Hospital =

- Global Health Services Pvt. Ltd.

Geography
- Location: Golra Morr, Islamabad, Pakistan
- Coordinates: 33.624°N 72.973°E

Organisation
- Care system: Private
- Type: Healthcare

Services
- Beds: 225

History
- Founded: 25 December 2011; 14 years ago

Links
- Website: qih.com.pk
- Lists: Hospitals in Pakistan

The Quaid-e-Azam International Hospital (QIH) is a private hospital in Islamabad, Pakistan. It was founded in 2004 by Shaukat Ali Bangash Diplomate American Board of Internal Medicine, Diplomate American Board of Infectious Diseases; Dr. Akram Bhatti, a Cardiac surgeon with Hospital in Las Vegas, NV, USA; and Dr. Khalid Saleem Aslam, Orthopedic surgeon. The hospital provides a broad range of secondary and tertiary care, including diagnosis of disease and team management of patient care.

== History ==
Quaid-e-Azam International Hospital (QIH) is a project of Global Health Services, which is a public limited company registered with SECP. The project is named after the Quaid-e-Azam Muhammad Ali Jinnah, and was inaugurated on 25 December 2011, celebrating the birthday of Jinnah.
