= Koohi Goth Hospital =

Hospital in Karachi, Pakistan

Koohi Goth Hospital کوہی گوٹھ ہسپتال
- Zafar and Atia Foundation Charitable Trust

Geography
- Location: Bin Qasim Town, Karachi, Pakistan
- Coordinates: 24°51′56″N 67°14′04″E

Organisation
- Care system: Private Hospital

History
- Opened: 2006

Links
- Website: koohigothhospital.org.pk
- Lists: Hospitals in Pakistan

Koohi Goth Women Hospital (Urdu: کوہی گوٹھ ہسپتال) is a hospital located in Bin Qasim Town, Karachi, Pakistan. It is a project of the Zafar and Atia Foundation Charitable Trust. This hospital treats 1 out of 6 cases reported in Pakistan.

This is the only charity fistula treatment center in South Asia.

== History ==
It started its services in 2006 by treating women suffering from complications like obstetric fistula and other gynecological disorders. It provides laparoscopic surgery and fistula management training.

The hospital runs under the supervision of Sher Shah Syed. He runs PNFWH and Koohi Goth Hospital in Landhi.

== Schools ==
It also has a chain of training institutions.

- Atia School of Paramedics
- Atia School of Midwifery
- Atia School of Nursing
