= Azad Jammu and Kashmir Medical College =

Azad Jammu Kashmir Medical College آزاد جموں و کشمیر طبی کالج
- آزاد جۆم تہٕ کٔشیٖر طِبی ژاٹہٕ ہال
- Other names: Mirwaiz Maulvi Mohammad Farooq Medical College
- Motto: Serving humanity is serving the Almighty
- Type: Public
- Established: 2012
- Affiliations: Pakistan Medical and Dental Council; University of Health Sciences, Lahore; Combined Military Hospital Muzaffarabad; International Medical Education Directory (IMED); College of Physicians and Surgeons Pakistan; University of Azad Jammu and Kashmir
- Chancellor: President of Azad Kashmir
- Principal: Prof Adnan Meraj
- Students: 500
- Location: Muzaffarabad, Azad Jammu & Kashmir, Pakistan; 34°12′36″N 73°16′48″E
- Campus: Urban
- Language: Urdu, English
- Colors: Maroon and White
- Website: ajkmc.edu.pk

Azad Jammu Kashmir Medical College (Urdu: آزاد جموں و کشمیر طبی کالج, Koshur; آزاد جۆم تہٕ کٔشیٖر طِبی ژاٹہٕ ہال )or (AJKMC) is a public medical institute located in Muzaffarabad, Azad Jammu & Kashmir, Pakistan. AJKMC is home to 500 students in the MBBS program, with clinical rotations occurring at Combined Military Hospital Muzaffarabad and Abbas Institute of Medical Sciences. AJKMC was established in 2011. It is recognized by the Pakistan Medical and Dental Council.

== History ==
AJKMC was inaugurated by Prime Minister Syed Yousaf Raza Gillani on 8 October 2011. Establishing a medical college was deemed necessary following the 2005 Kashmir Earthquake, which exposed a shortage of medical professionals at medical facilities in Azad Jammu and Kashmir.

== Affiliations and recognitions ==
The college is affiliated and recognized by following Organizations and Institutes:

- Abbas Institute of Medical Sciences (AIMS Hospital)
- College of Physicians and Surgeons Pakistan
- Combined Military Hospital Muzaffarabad
- International Medical Education Directory (IMED)
- Pakistan Medical and Dental Council
- University of Azad Jammu and Kashmir
- University of Health Sciences, Lahore

== Publications ==
The official scientific journals of the college is Kashmir Journal of Medical Sciences (KJMS). It contains original articles, case reports, review articles, short communication, letters to editor, and view points.

== See also ==
- List of institutions of higher education in Azad Kashmir
- List of medical schools in Pakistan
- Medical Education in Pakistan
