= Lahore Knowledge Park =

Lahore Knowledge Park (LKP) is an under-construction science park located on a 852 acres located on Bedian Road in Lahore District, Pakistan.

Owned and managed by the Lahore Knowledge Park Company with an initial investment of $1 billion, of which $200 million is invested by Government of Punjab. The project is designed by Frost & Sullivan. The park includes universities, science and innovation hubs, a retail and central business district, a residential district, an entertainment zone and green areas.

Pakistan Kidney and Liver Institute and Research Center is under construction in the park.

== Masterplan ==
The park's masterplan divides it into five categories:

- life sciences and bio-technology,
- design and creative industry,
- information technology,
- computer sciences
- and science and engineering

As of 2016, the COMSATS Institute of Information Technology and Lancaster University will jointly set up a graduate school in the park. Information Technology University will also move its campus to the park.
