= United Christian Hospital, Lahore =

Hospital in Lahore, Pakistan

United Christian Hospital

Geography
- Location: Lahore, Punjab, Pakistan, Pakistan
- Coordinates: 31°30′32″N 74°20′26″E

Organisation
- Care system: Public
- Religious affiliation: Presbyterian Church; Methodist Church; Anglican Church

History
- Constructed: 1948

Links
- Website: unitedchristianhospitallahore.org
- Lists: Hospitals in Pakistan

United Christian Hospital (UCH) (Urdu: یونائیٹڈ کرسچن ہسپتال) is a 250-bed non-profit Christian hospital located in Lahore, Pakistan. It is affiliated with the Church of Pakistan.

== History ==
United Christian Hospital was established following a meeting of Protestant Missions in Pakistan on January 1, 1948, to convert a refugee center into a permanent healthcare facility. The project, led by Professor Speers, initially planned for a 115-bed hospital. The Presbyterian Church acquired the land, while the Methodist Church and Anglican Church funded the construction.

During its first decade, UCH developed several departments, including surgery, obstetrics and gynecology, pediatrics, ophthalmology, and orthopedics. The hospital's first Medical Director was Dr. Vroon, succeeded by Dr. Ralph Blocksama, a surgeon who contributed to the development of the surgery department.

In 1964, Pakistan's first open-heart surgery was performed in the hospital.

== Facilities ==
The hospital provides services in obstetrics and gynecology, orthopedic surgery, general medicine, general surgery, pediatrics, ophthalmology, and outreach care.
