= Chiniot General Hospital =

Hospital in Karachi, Pakistan

Geography
- Location: 3 Street 1, Sector 41 B Korangi Township, Karachi City, Sindh, Pakistan, Pakistan
- Coordinates: 24.984695°N 67.238928°E

Organisation
- Care system: General healthcare
- Type: Private sector
- Affiliated university: College of Physicians and Surgeons of Pakistan

Links
- Lists: Hospitals in Pakistan

Chiniot General Hospital (CGH) located in Korangi Town, Karachi, Pakistan is a project of Chiniot Anjuman Islamia.

== Recognized hospital ==
Chiniot General Hospital, Karachi is recognized by the College of Physicians and Surgeons of Pakistan.

== Overview ==
Chiniot Anjuman Islamia is a registered general welfare organization founded in 1983, it is managed by some industrialists and businessmen belonging to the Shaikh baradari of Chiniot. Most notably, Qaiser Ahmed Sheikh is one of the founders.
