= Burhani Hospital =

Hospital in Karachi, Pakistan

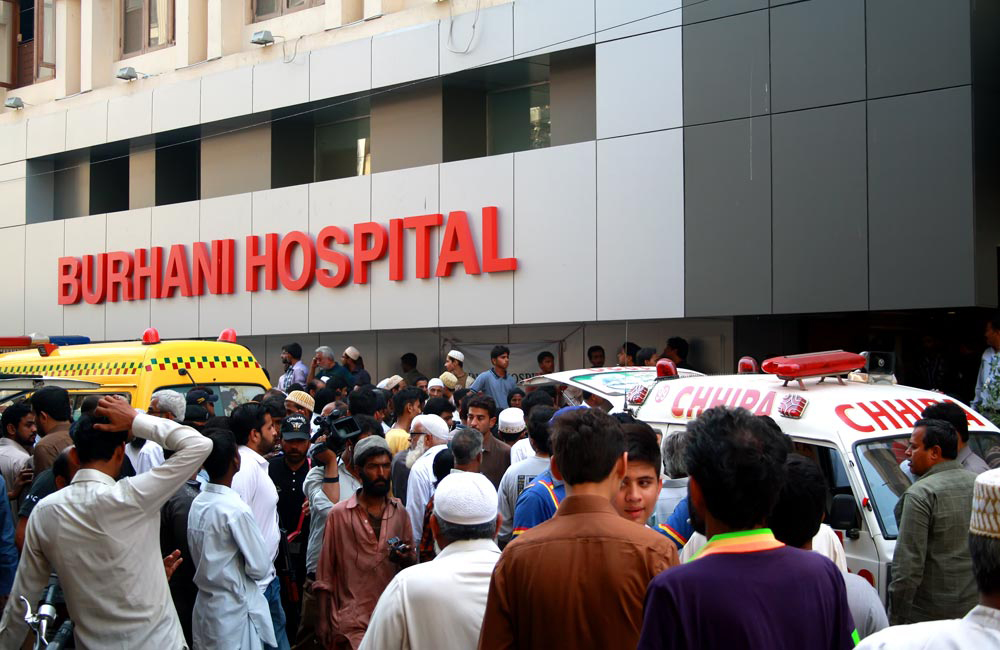

Geography
- Location: Pakistan Chowk, Saddar Town, Karachi, Sindh, Pakistan
- Coordinates: 24°51′11″N 67°00′37″E

History
- Former name: Abdulhusain Marvi Maternity Home
- Opened: May 27, 1978

Links
- Website: burhanihospital.org.pk
- Lists: Hospitals in Pakistan

The Burhani Hospital is a not-for-profit hospital located on Tayebjee Road, Garikhata, Saddar Town, Karachi, Sindh, Pakistan.

== History ==
It was founded as a dispensary in 1913 for the treatment of influenza.

Later, it was converted into a maternity home and was renamed as Abdulhusain Marvi Maternity Home. Abdulhusain Karimji Marvi donated a piece of land, to start the Abdulhusain Marvi Maternity Home for the members of the Dawoodi Bohra community.

On June 1, 1945, the management of the maternity home was handed over to the Burhani Board which continued to oversee the functions of the clinic until January 2004. The board at that time was also managing another hospital, now called the Saifee Hospital.

On May 27, 1978, the board upgraded and converted the facility into a full-fledged general hospital. Thus the Burhani Hospital Trust was established and re-registered on January 13, 2004.
