= DHQ Hospital Gilgit =

DHQ Hospital, Gilgit مرکزی صوبائی ہسپتال گلگت
- Health & Population Welfare Department, Government of Gilgit-Baltistan

Geography
- Location: Gilgit, Gilgit-Baltistan, Pakistan
- Coordinates: 35.9188°N 74.3033°E

Organisation
- Type: District Headquarters (DHQ)

Services
- Emergency department: Yes
- Beds: 200

Links
- Lists: Hospitals in Pakistan

DHQ Hospital Gilgit (Urdu: مرکزی ضلع ہسپتال گلگت is the largest hospital in Gilgit Baltistan, Pakistan providing tertiary care facilities. The hospital is being run by Health and Population Welfare Department, Government of Gilgit-Baltistan. The hospital currently has 200 beds which is being upgraded to 400 bed facility.

== See also ==
- List of hospitals in Pakistan
