= Mardan Medical Complex =

- Public-private partnership

Geography
- Location: Mardan, Khyber Pakhtunkhwa, Pakistan

Organisation
- Type: Tertiary

Services
- Emergency department: Yes
- Beds: 500

History
- Founded: 2008

Links
- Website: https://www.mmc.mmckp.gov.pk/

Mardan Medical Complex (MMC) is a major healthcare facility located in Mardan, Khyber Pakhtunkhwa, Pakistan. It serves as the teaching hospital of Bacha Khan Medical College. The complex operates as a public-private partnership between the government of Khyber Pakhtunkhwa and Mardan Medical Complex Private Limited.

Established in 2008, the complex comprises a 500-bed tertiary care hospital, a medical college, and a nursing school. The medical college provides undergraduate and postgraduate programs in medicine, nursing, and various other healthcare disciplines.

== See also ==
- Bacha Khan Medical Complex Swabi
