= Fauji Foundation Hospitals =

Hospitals in Pakistan

Geography
- Location: Pakistan

Links
- Website: www.fauji.org.pk/health_hosp.php
- Lists: Hospitals in Pakistan

Fauji Foundation Hospitals are a group of hospitals started by Fauji Foundation in multiple cities of Pakistan, including Lahore and Rawalpindi.

== History ==
The first hospital called TB hospital, as part of Fauji Foundation Healthcare System, was established in 1954.

== Hospitals ==
- Fauji Foundation Hospital, Rawalpindi
- Fauji Foundation Hospital, Lahore
- Shaukat Omar Memorial Hospital, Karachi
- Fauji Foundation Hospital, Peshawar
- Fauji Foundation Hospital, Kallar Kahar
- Fauji Foundation Hospital, Jhelum
- Fauji Foundation Hospital, Mansehra
- Al Hilal Fauji Foundation Hospital, Faisalabad
- Fauji Foundation Hospital, Sargodha
- Fauji Foundation Hospital, Multan

== Departments ==
They provides facilities of:

- Emergency and Trauma centre
- Outpatient Department
- Internal Medicine
- Surgery
- Paediatrics
- Orthopaedics
- Gynaecology and Obstetrics
- ENT & Eye
- Paeds ICU
- Neonatal ICU
- Medical ICU
- Urology
- Post Operative Care Unit
- Operation Theatres, Laboratory, Radiology (Digital x-ray, Ultrasound and CT scan) are well established. Visiting consultants of all specialties and subspecialties are available. This hospital is providing services free of cost to families of ex-army persons and at very affordable rates to patients from the common public.
