= Civil Hospital, Larkana =

Coordinates: 27.554325°N 68.208738°E

Civil Hospital Larkana
- Civil Hospital Health Service
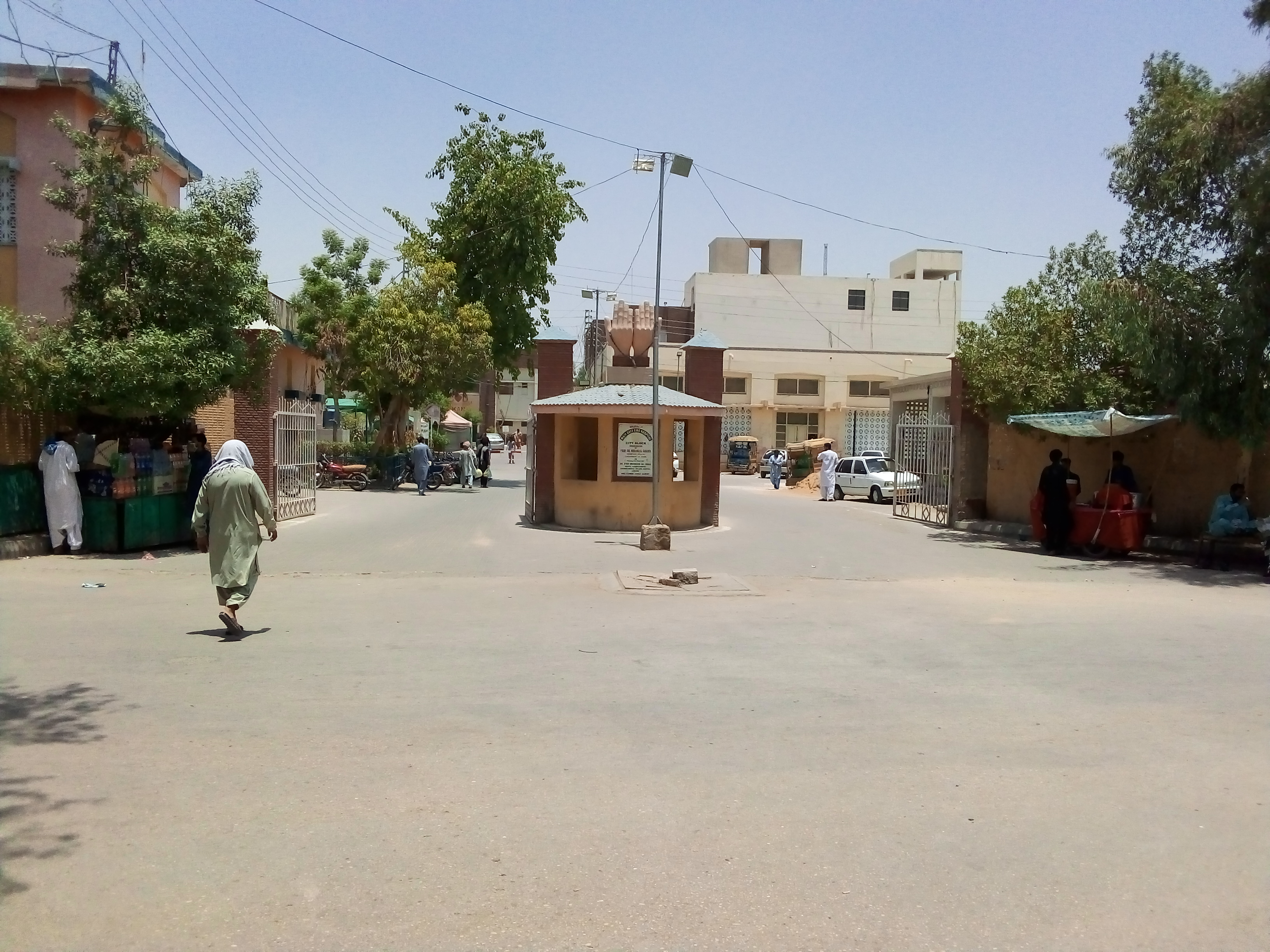
- Main gate

Geography
- Location: Larkana, Sindh, Pakistan

Organisation
- Care system: Public
- Affiliated university: Shaheed Mohtarma Benazir Bhutto Medical University Larkana

Services
- Emergency department: Yes

History
- Founded: 1 February 1951

Links
- Lists: Hospitals in Pakistan

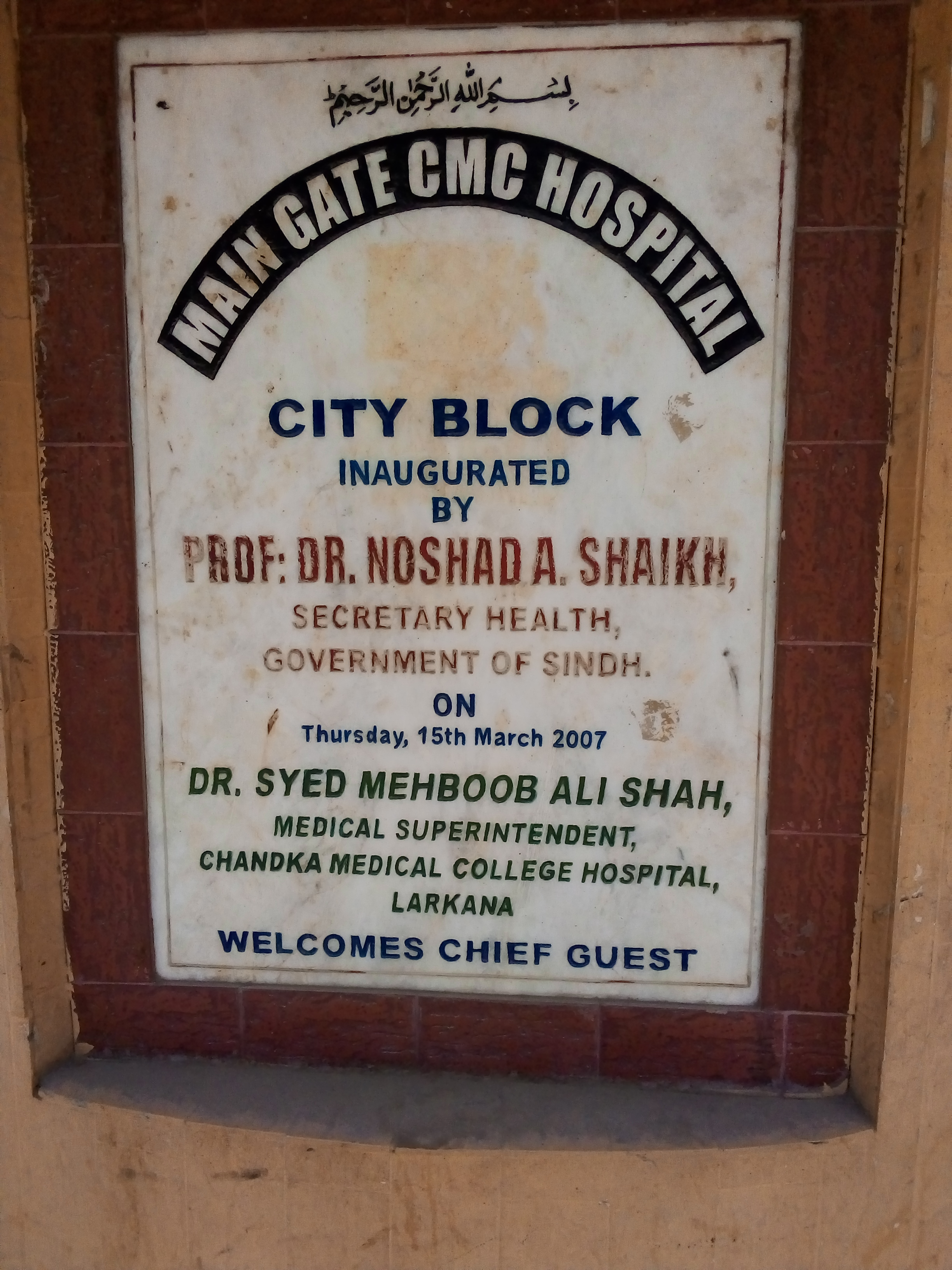
Memorial tablet

Civil Hospital, Larkana is a public hospital located in Larkana, Sindh.

== History ==
The cornerstone of this 100-bed hospital was laid by Khawaja Nizamuddin, Governor-General of Pakistan on February 1, 1951. The hospital was completed three years later, in 1954. Nawab Amir Ali Lahori provided land for the hospital. It was the first custom-built civil hospital in Larkana. Prior to the establishment of the hospital, the girls' school building on Baker Road was relocated in 1909 from Shikarpour (Sind) and was used as Larkana Civil Hospital.

== Departments ==
Hospital departments include MRI & CT Scan, Outdoor & Indoor Pharmacy, Digital X-ray & Ultrasound Doppler Ultrasound, the Ophthalmology, and Pediatric Ophthalmology.

=== Other departments ===
- National Institute of Cardiovascular Diseases, Larkana
- Psychology
- Psychiatry
- Chest Asthma
- Ear Nose & Throat
- Emergency Department
- Orthopedics
- Tuberculosis
- AIDS
- Hepatitis
- Pathology
- Urology
- Nephrology
- Hematology
- General Physician
- Pulmonary Department

== Service area ==
The territory of the Larkana Civil Hospital covers the Larkana district, Northern Sindh, and Balochistan. The hospital has a mobile service department.

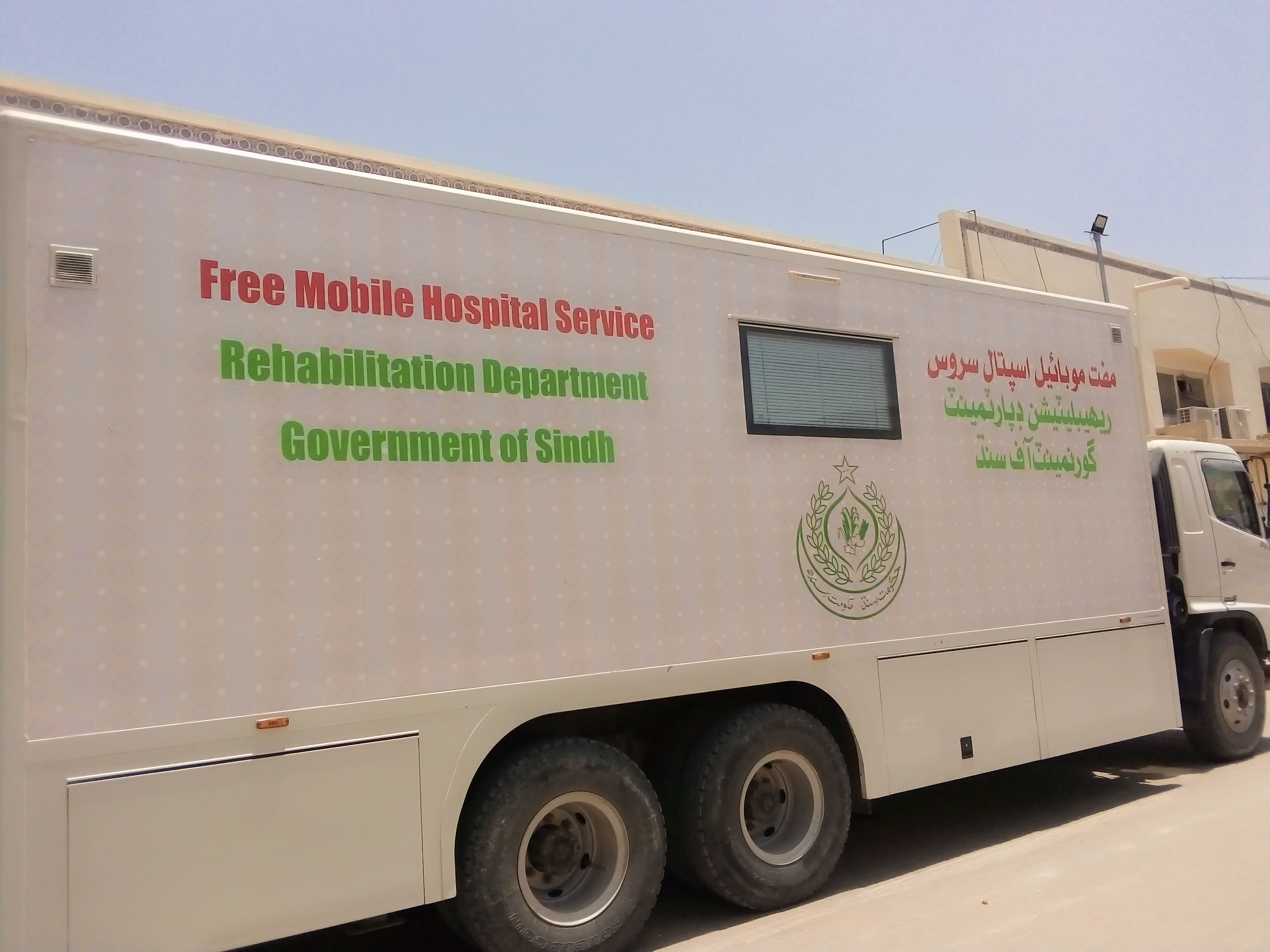
Patrolling Emergency Medical service

== Gallery ==
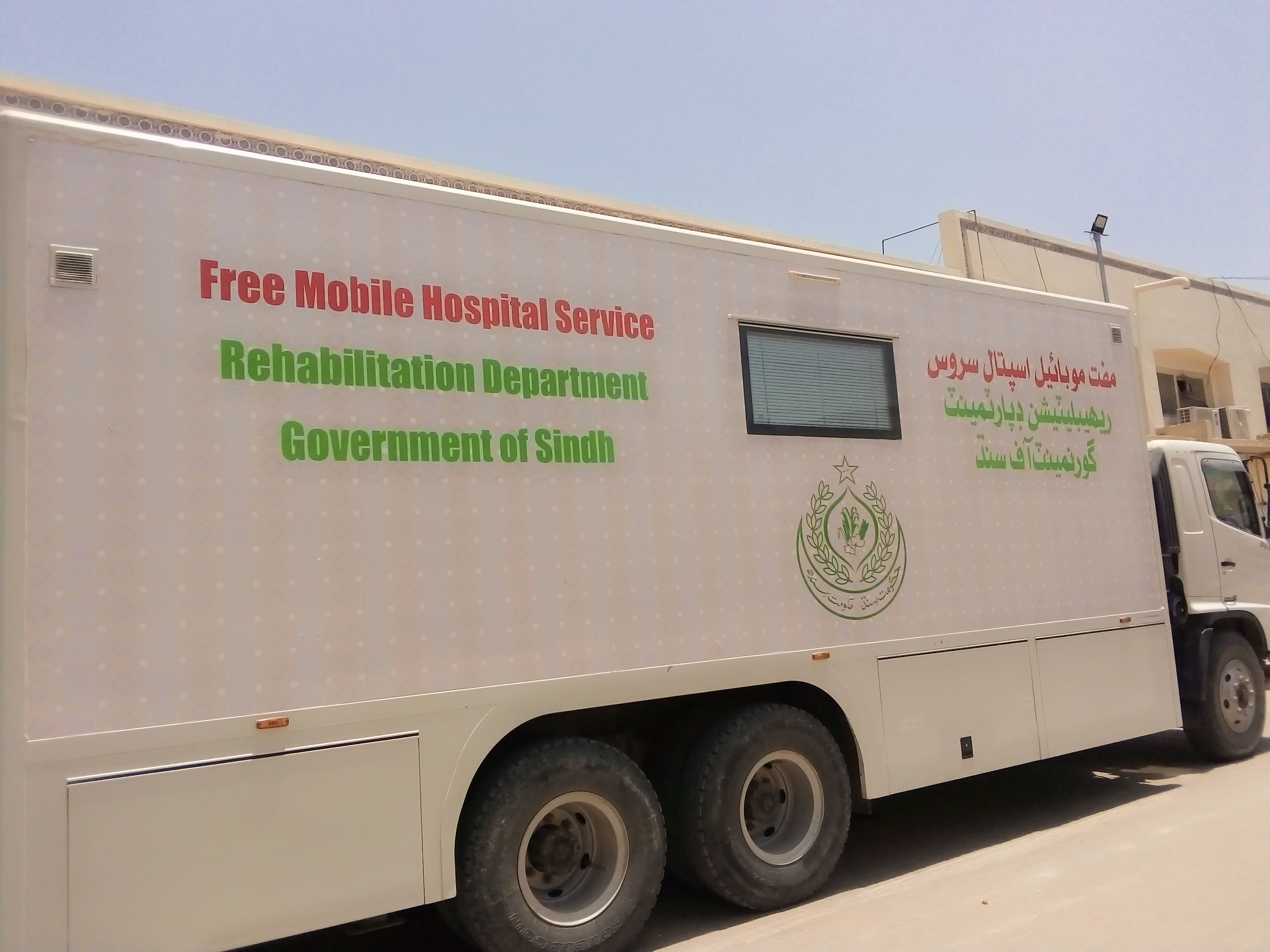
Patrolling Emergency Medical service

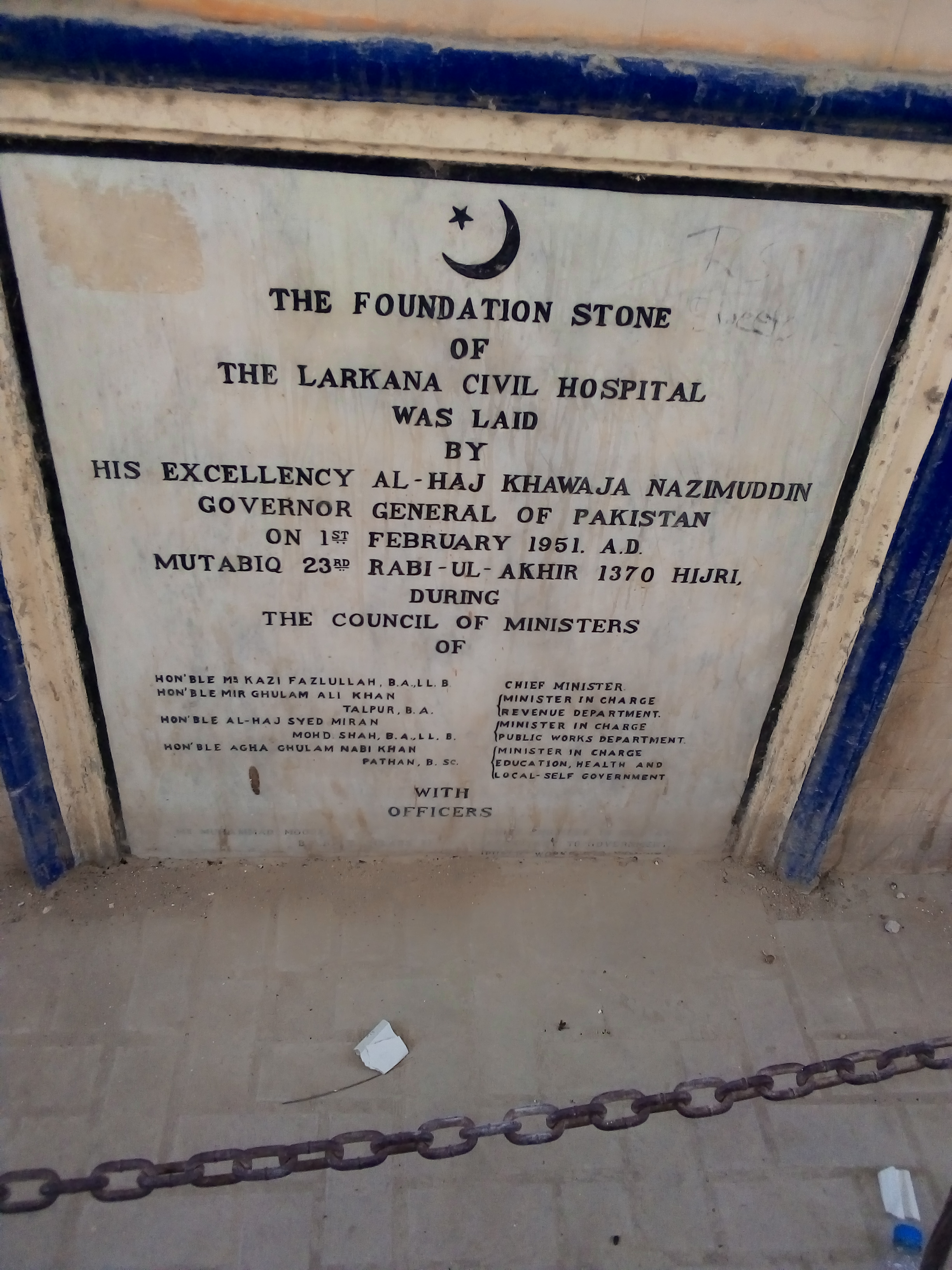
Founding Plaque

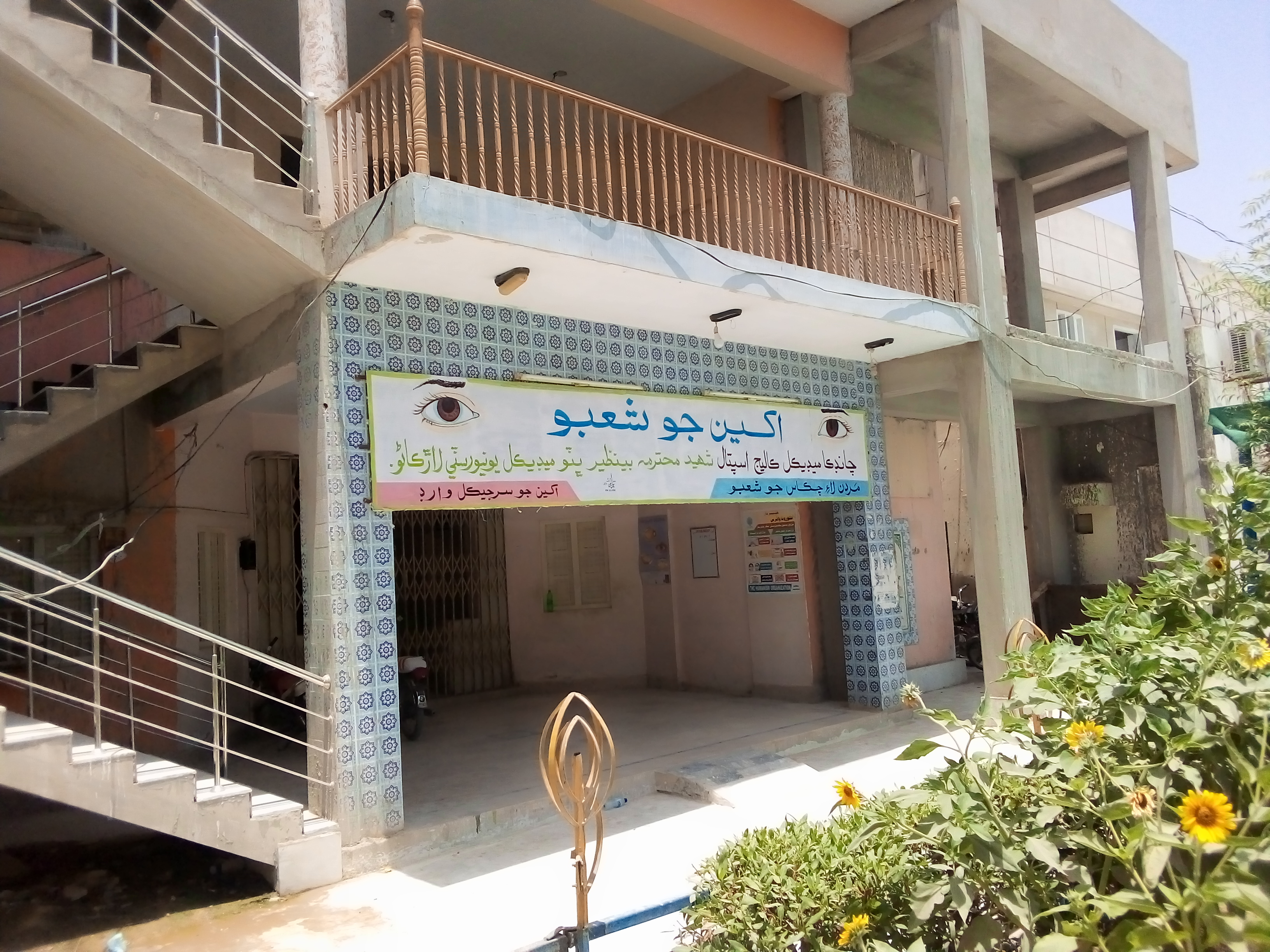
Building of Department of Ophthalmology

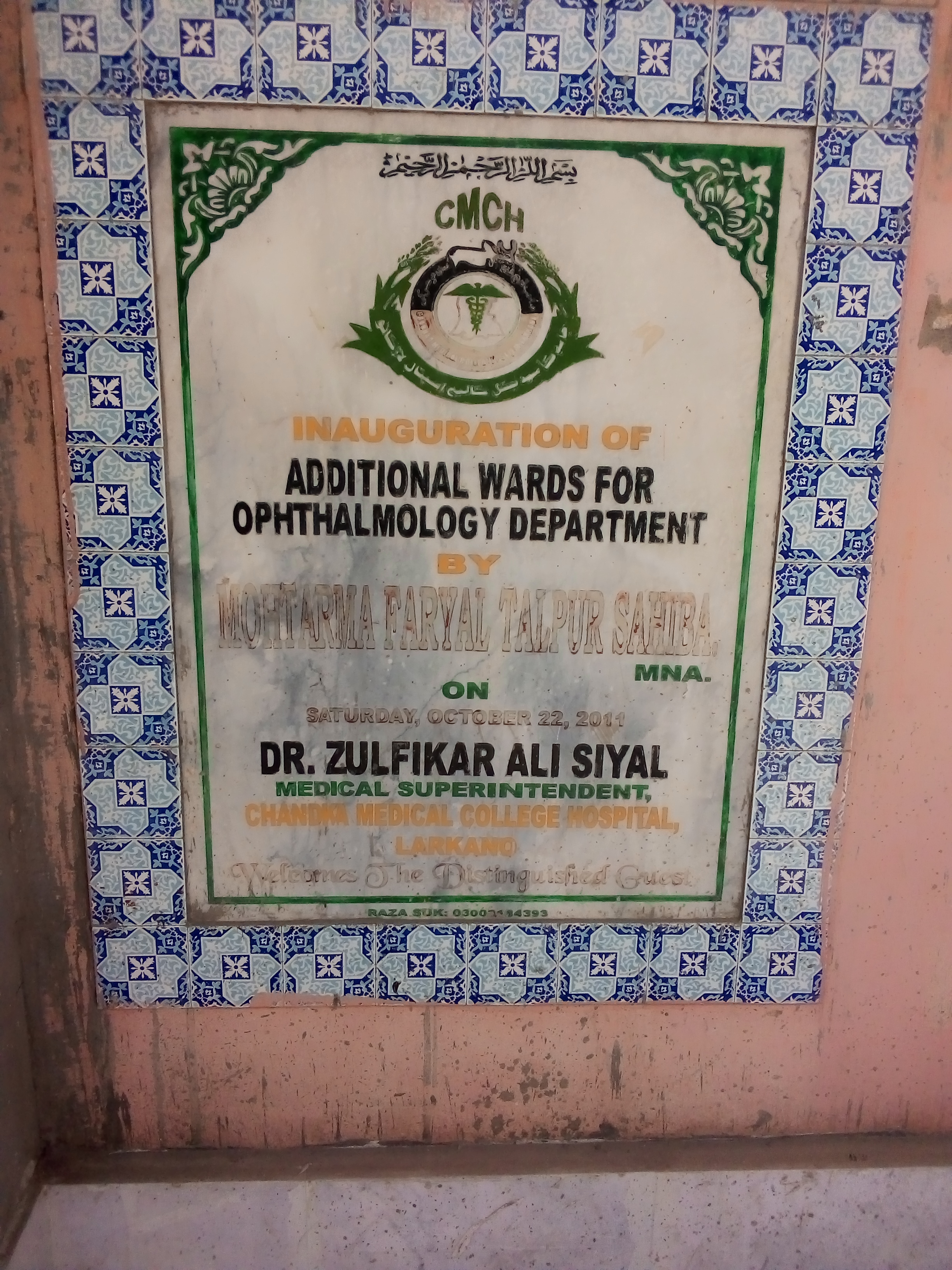
Plaque of department of Ophthalmology

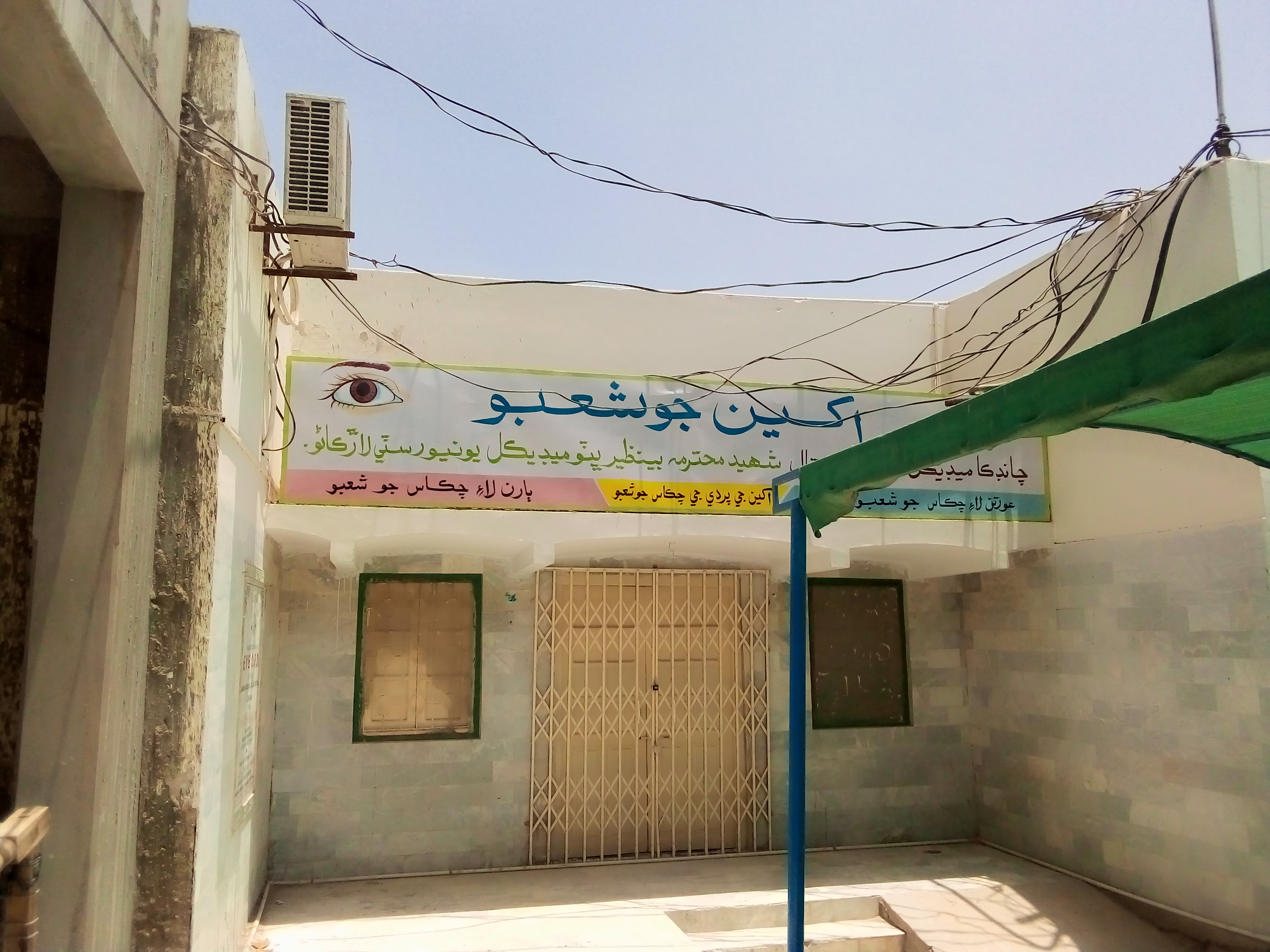
Paediatric Ophthalmology building

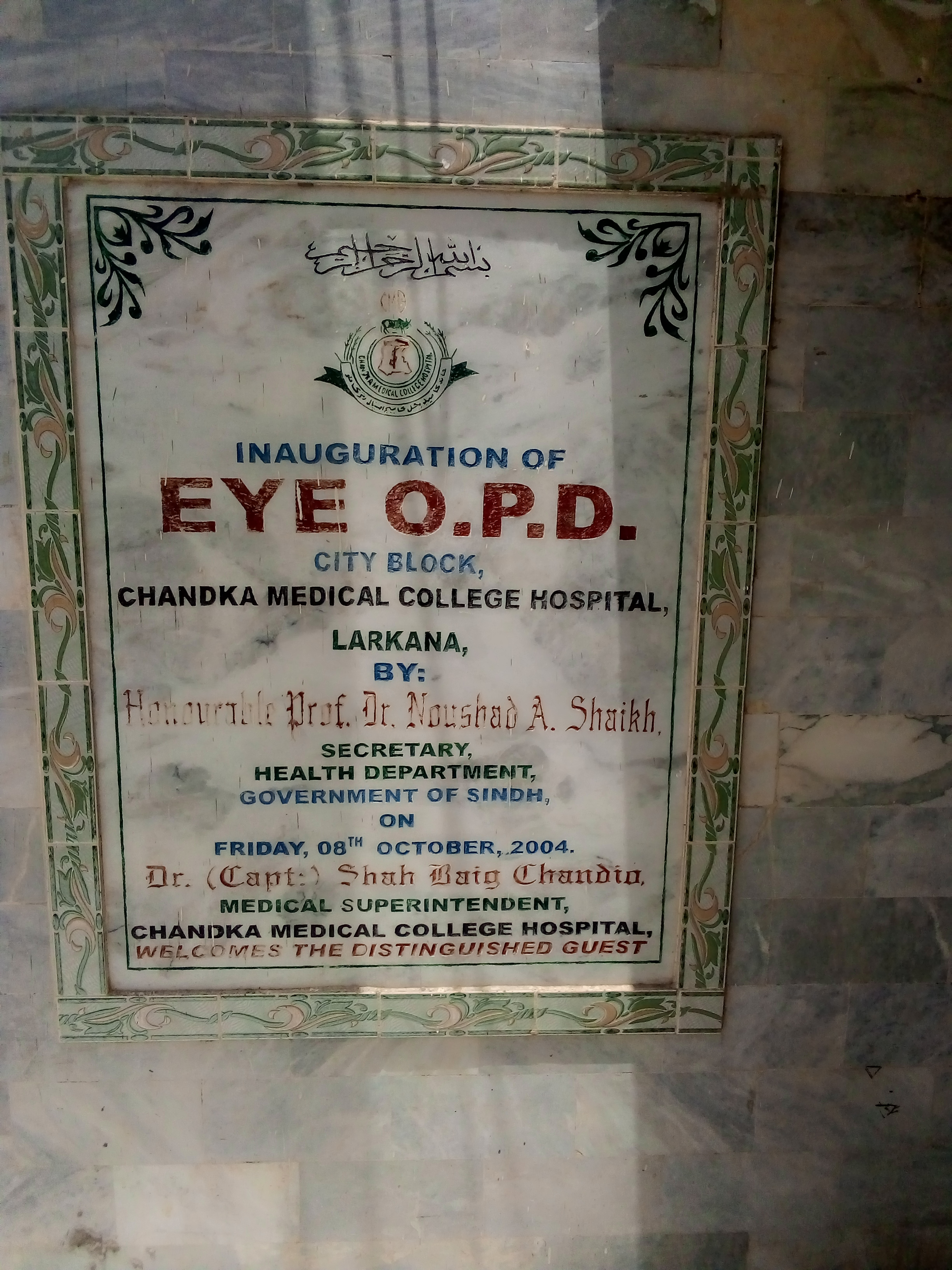
Paediatric Ophthalmology plaque

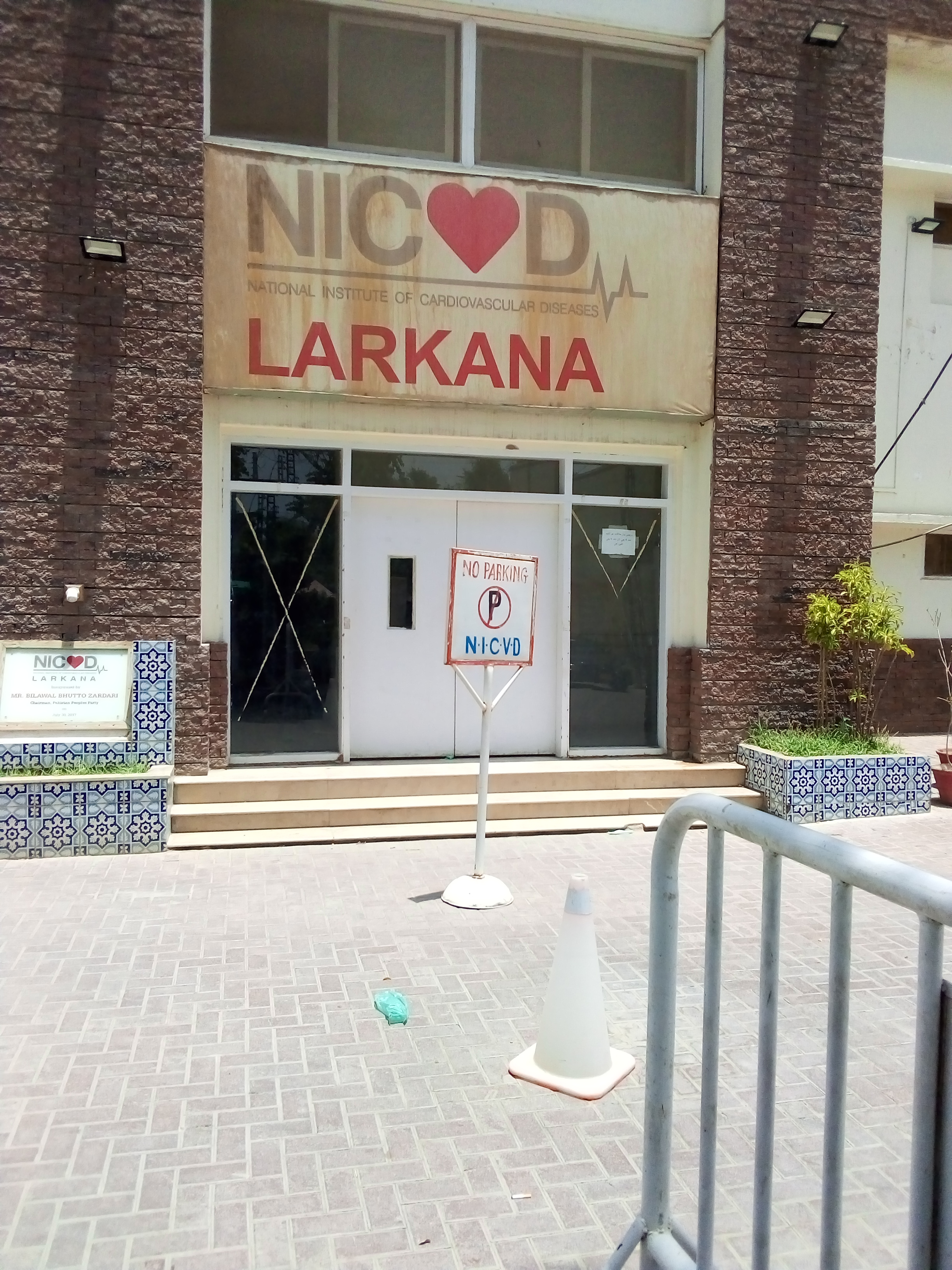
Building of department of Cardiology
