= Bacha Khan Medical College =

Medical institution in Mardan, Khyber Pakhtunkhwa, Pakistan

Coordinates: 34.1521°N 72.0292°E

- باچا خان طبی کالج
- Motto: Service to Humanity
- Type: Public Sector
- Established: 2010
- Affiliations: PMDC; KMU; CPSP, WDOMS, IMED
- Principal: Muhammad Fazil
- Location: Mardan, Pakistan
- Website: bkmc.edu.pk

Bacha Khan Medical College (Urdu: باچا خان طبی کالج, Pashto: د باچا خان طب پوهنځی) is a public medical education institution located in Mardan District, Khyber Pakhtunkhwa, Pakistan. It has been named after Khan Abdul Ghaffar Khan, also known as Bacha Khan. The college is affiliated with Khyber Medical University and is recognised by the PMDC.

== History ==
The Medical College at Mardan was inaugurated on 1 January 2010 in the area of Sheikh Maltoon Town Mardan, named after the great freedom fighter of the soil, Khan Abdul Ghaffar Khan, better known as Bacha Khan.

== Campus ==
The present campus of Bacha Khan Medical College (BKMC) is based in a restructured portion of Mardan Medical Complex, which itself spreads over 500 kanals of land, and is the teaching hospital for BKMC. It has all the necessary infrastructure up to the final year MBBS and BDS. The Academic Block houses lecture theatres, Library, SLRC, faculty and departmental offices. A new block containing a Student Affair Section, Guest Waiting Area, separate Cafeterias for Male and Female, a new Lecture Theatre, offices for faculty and 250 capacity Auditorium, named after the founder of BKMC (Ameer Haider Khan Hoti, Chief Minister Khyber Pakhtunkhwa) for his contributions to the college as “Haider Hall” have also been constructed and are fully functional. Work on the state of the art, purpose built building, is in progress which will be completed at a cost of approximately Rs.1.7 Billion.

== Departments ==
The laboratories and museum, equipped for biochemistry, physiology, anatomy, pharmacology, pathology, forensic and community medicine have also been established. The dissection hall has the latest mortuary cooling unit with a capacity to store up to six bodies. A toxicology lab, only the second of its kind in the province, is also present in Forensic Department. A postmortem section with its own cooling unit is also operational at MMC for medico-legal cases and autopsies. Department of Medical Education has also been established to keep the students and teachers in line with modern system of medical education. More recently the Department of Dentistry has been established in the college.

== SLRC and Library ==
A computer laboratory called the Self Learning Resource Center has also been established with the latest computers and equipment to cater the need of the students and staff. The college is connected to the computer laboratory through a wifi wireless network with 4MB DSL line. The college, despite being the youngest of the public sector medical colleges has services of the required, qualified teaching staff (basic / clinical), recruited through the Public Service Commission. The college has a well-established, fully air-conditioned library having more than 6000 text / reference books and journals. It has separate reading areas for students and staff.

=== Societies ===
For extra-curricular activities Social Work, Sports and Literary Societies are present in the college to promote a healthy and friendly atmosphere in the college among staff and students.

== Recognition and affiliations ==
BKMC is the first Public Sector Medical College to be recognized in the first year of its establishment by Pakistan Medical & Dental Council in 2010. The college is also affiliated with KMU Peshawar since 2010. College of Physicians and Surgeons Pakistan (CPSP) granted accreditation for postgraduate training in major disciplines at MMC Teaching Hospital in 2011. Mardan Medical Complex (MMC), having all the major and minor specialties with state of the art diagnostic (CT Scanner, MRI) and supportive services is the teaching hospital of BKMC. Phase-I and II of MMC have already been completed and the total bed strength at present is over 400. Phase III has been approved which will increase the bed strength to 800. In addition to this, construction work on a 200 bedded Mohtarama Benazir Bhutto Shaheed Children Hospital has been started and will be completed soon.

== Alumni ==
Admitting capacity of the college is 59 in MBBS and 25 in BDS courses. At present three batches of MBBS with 168 students and 1st batch of BDS with 25 students are enrolled in the college. Sufficient accommodation is available for students, both for Girls and Boys. Transport facility is being provided to the students.

First batch of BDS students has been admitted from session 2011-12.

== Future plan ==
Lastly for future expansion of the college 1000 Kanals land near Sheikh Maltoon Town has been acquired recently. This will be used for the construction of staff colony, CPSP and KMU regional offices, a Nuclear Medicine and Radiotherapy Institute and a separate Dental College.
