= Children Hospital, Lahore =

Children's Hospital & The Institute of Child Health, Lahore
- Punjab Health Department

Geography
- Location: Ferozepur Road, Lahore, Punjab, Pakistan
- Coordinates: 31.4801°N 74.3430°E

Organisation
- Type: Teaching

Services
- Beds: 1,100

History
- Opened: May 1995

Links
- Website: www.chich.edu.pk
- Lists: Hospitals in Pakistan

Children's Hospital and Institute of Child Health, established in May 1995, is a public children's hospital located on Ferozepur Road, Lahore, Punjab, Pakistan. The institution comes under Punjab Health Department.

== History ==
In 1984, the idea of building a child healthcare institute was presented at the annual meeting of the Pakistan Paediatric Association. Although the construction of the hospital began in 1990, the outpatient department wasn't opened until May 1995. The emergency services began in October 1996, and inpatient services in December 1998.

== Schools ==
- Institute of Child Health
- School of Nursing
  - Bachelor of Science in Nursing (BSN)
- School of Allied Health Sciences
  - Doctor of Physical Therapy (DPT)
  - B.Sc in Dental Technology
  - B.Sc in Medical Imaging Technology
  - B.Sc in Medical Laboratory Technology
  - B.Sc in Occupational Therapy
  - B.Sc in Operation Theater Technology
  - B.Sc in Speech and Language Pathology
