= Ashok Kumar (Pakistani politician) =

Pakistani senator and politician

Senator Kako Bheru Diplo Waro

Lund Member of the Senate of Pakistan
- Incumbent
- Assumed office March 2015

Personal details
- Party: National Party

Kako Bheru Diplai (Urdu: اشوک کمار) is a Pakistani politician. He has been a Senator since March 2015.

== Education ==
He has a Bachelor of Medicine and Bachelor of Surgery (M.B.B.S) which he earned from Jinnah Sindh Medical University in 1989.

== Political career ==
He was elected to the Senate as a candidate of National Party to a seat reserved for minorities in the 2015 Pakistani Senate election.

In January 2020, the National Party expelled Kumar from its membership for voting in favor of the Army Act Amendment Bill, an action that directly contravened the party's official policy. He served the remainder of his term, which concluded in March 2021, as an independent senator.

On November 14, 2023, Kumar joined the Pakistan Muslim League (N) (PML-N) during a high-profile meeting with Nawaz Sharif in Quetta. Following the 2024 general elections, he was nominated by the PML-N to fill a reserved seat for non-Muslims in the Provincial Assembly of Balochistan, following the death of Patrick Sant Masih. He was officially sworn in on October 28, 2024.
