= Women's Christian Hospital, Multan =

Hospital in Multan

Geography
- Location: Multan, Pakistan
- Coordinates: 30°11′21″N 71°26′30″E

Organisation
- Care system: Public
- Religious affiliation: Church Missionary Society

History
- Former name: Mohabbat Hospital
- Opened: 1886

Links
- Website: wchmultan.org
- Lists: Hospitals in Pakistan

Women's Christian Hospital, Multan (Urdu: کرسچن ہسپتال برائے خواتین، ملتان), commonly known as Mission Hospital Multan, is a hospital in Multan Cantonment, Punjab, Pakistan. It is one of the oldest women's hospital located in Multan.

Covering an area of 2.63 hectares (6.5 acres), this facility, often referred to as the Mission Hospital, is noted for its free healthcare services for underprivileged patients.

== History ==
Women's Christian Hospital was founded in 1886 by the Church Missionary Society (CMS) as a dispensary, addressing the absence of medical services for women at a time when societal norms, such as purdah, limited their access to healthcare. It served as an alternative to the Civil Hospital, the region's only other hospital, which was exclusive to men. In its earlier history, it was known as Mohabbat Hospital, with Dr. Eager as one of its founding members.

The dispensary evolved into a hospital after receiving a land grant from the cantonment magistrate, leading to the construction of an outpatient block and wards in 1899. The hospital's patient base grew over time, indicating a growing acceptance of women's healthcare needs in the region.

In 1935, a maternity facility and labor rooms were created, as well as a nurse training school. The C.M.S. sold the 100-bed hospital to the U.S.-based Women's Union Missionary Society (WUMS) on October 1, 1956. WUMS was then registered with the Government of Pakistan and is still operating under the name WUMS.

In the 1970s, it introduced additional community development programs, such as credit unions, small loan schemes, and sanitation projects. Vocational training in the domestic skills was later added to these initiatives.

In 1978, the hospital's concentration shifted to obstetrics, gynecology, and pediatrics alone.

== Facilities ==
Historically, Women's Christian Hospital has been focusing on women's healthcare, particularly in the fields of gynecology and obstetrics. As of 2005, the hospital had a capacity of 75 beds and was serving around 46,000 patients annually.
