= Abbas Institute of Medical Sciences =

Hospital in Azar Jammu & Kashmir, Pakistan

Coordinates: 34.331175°N 73.468608°E

Abbas Institute of Medical Sciences عباس طبی علوم اداره

Geography
- Location: Muzaffarabad, Azad Kashmir, Pakistan, Pakistan

Organisation
- Type: Teaching
- Affiliated university: Azad Jammu Kashmir Medical College

Services
- Emergency department: Yes
- Beds: 350

History
- Opened: 1992

Links
- Lists: Hospitals in Pakistan

Abbas Institute of Medical Sciences (Urdu: عباس طبی علوم اداره, abbreviated as AIMS) is a hospital located in Muzaffarabad, Azad Jammu & Kashmir, Pakistan. It is one of the oldest hospitals in the province and a teaching hospital affiliated with Azad Jammu Kashmir Medical College.

== History ==
Abbas Institute of Medical Sciences was established in 1992 and is the first hospital of its kind in the city and region.

== Teaching hospital status ==
In 2012, Azad Jammu Kashmir Medical College was established and the hospital was given the status of teaching hospital by the Pakistan Medical and Dental Council. The hospital is recognized by College of Physicians and Surgeons Pakistan for postgraduate residency in different disciplines.

== Free treatment to poor cancer patients ==
On 12 September 2019, the then Special Assistant to the Prime Minister for Health Zafar Mirza, said The Ministry of National Health Services and a pharmaceutical firm signed a Letter of Understanding to provide free treatment to poor cancer patients in Islamabad, Gilgit-Baltistan and Azad Kashmir under a public-private partnership.
