= Pakistan Kidney and Liver Institute =

Hospital and healthcare institute

- Government of Punjab, Pakistan

Geography
- Location: 1 PKLI Avenue; Knowledge Park, Barki; Lahore, Punjab, Pakistan

Organisation
- Type: Public sector hospital and healthcare facility

Services
- Beds: 800

History
- Founded: 20 December 2017

Links
- Website: pkli.org.pk
- Lists: Hospitals in Pakistan

Pakistan Kidney and Liver Institute and Research Center (PKLI&RC; Urdu: پاکستان کڈنی اینڈ لیور انسٹی ٹیوٹ) is a tertiary referral hospital in Lahore, Punjab, Pakistan.

Punjab Chief Minister Shehbaz Sharif formally began construction of the hospital on 20 May 2017. It was inaugurated later that year on 25 December 2017 by Chief Minister Sharif.

Reviewing the progress on this project in 2016, the Chief Minister of Punjab Shahbaz Sharif reportedly said, "The institute will provide modern treatment of kidney and liver diseases and free medical facilities to poor patients. Latest medical facilities will be available to kidney and liver patients under one roof in the institute".

On 2 November 2025, the hospital achieved a major milestone by successfully completing 1,000 liver transplants, alongside 1,100 kidney and 14 bone marrow transplants and treating 4 million patients in total since 2017.

As of 2025, approximately PKR 13.6 billion has been spent on the development and operation of the hospital, which continues to serve as a beacon of hope for underprivileged patients by offering advanced healthcare services.
