= Pakistan Railway Hospitals =

Pakistan Railway Hospitals is a chain of government hospital located throughout country and is under the administration of Pakistan Railways.

== History ==
The hospitals were constructed during the British Raj.

In January 2019, a nursery ward was inaugurated at the Railway Hospital Multan. Since 2020, the hospitals in Lahore, Karachi, Multan are operated by the Islamic International Medical College Trust (IIMCT) under the public-private partnership for thirty years.

== Hospitals ==
- Railway Hospital Multan, It has a capacity of 500 beds but only 84 beds are operational.
- Railway Hospital Lahore
- Railway Hospital Rawalpindi
- Railway Hospital Peshawar
- Railway Hospital Karachi
- Railway Hospital Sukkur
- Railway Hospital Quetta
- Railway Hospital Nawabshah
