= Gambat Liver Transplant Center =

Hospital in Gambat, Sindh

Coordinates: 27°20′35″N 68°32′29″E

Gambat Liver Transplant Program

Geography
- Location: Sindh, Ranipur, Pakistan

Organisation
- Care system: Public Sector
- Type: Healthcare, Liver & Kidney Transplantation
- Patron: Dr Rahim Bux Bhatti

Services
- Beds: 500

History
- Founded: 1 January 2016

Links
- Website: www.gambatlivertransplant.com
- Lists: Hospitals in Pakistan

The Gambat Liver Transplant Center (also Gambat Organ Transplant Unit) is a Sindh government public hospital, located in Gambat, Khairpur Mirs, Pakistan.

The transplant program provides free liver transplants to individuals who cannot afford the cost of the treatment.

Started in 2016, the 500-bed facility was the first Pakistani hospital to perform both a kidney transplant and a liver transplant in the same surgery.

In 2020, the hospital performed 210 living-donor liver transplants, the highest number ever recorded in Pakistan. Until January 2021, Gambat Liver Transplant Unit carried out 330 liver transplants and 102 kidney transplants during the period by a team of nine surgeons. Its out-patient clinic has been catering to as many as 250 patients. It is currently the only public sector transplant unit in Pakistan that performs 6 living donor liver transplantations and 3 kidney transplantations per week.
