= Child Healthcare Institute Sukkur =

Hospital in Sukkur, Pakistan

Geography
- Location: Sukkur Bypass N-65, (Pakistan)
- Coordinates: 27°42′13.7″N 68°49′56.1″E

Organisation
- Type: Public sector Teaching Hospital

Services
- Emergency department: Yes
- Beds: 200 beds

History
- Founded: 2023 by Government

Links
- Website: https://www.sichn.com.pk/about-sukkur.php

The Government of Sindh established the Child Healthcare Institute, the 200 bed state of the art children hospital at Sukkur, with the help of the South Korean government. The hospital was built over 27 acres of land adjacent to Ghulam Muhammad Mahar Medical College at a cost of US$57.274 million, at Airport Road, Sukkur. After completion the hospital was handed over to Sindh Institute of Child Health and Neonatology (SICHN). The hospital comprises a Neonatal Care Unit (NICU), Emergency Unit, Paediatric Intensive Care Unit (PICU), Paediatric Surgeries, Occupational Therapy department, and other services. Currently the hospital is providing medical care to patients from different parts of Northern Sindh, including Sukkur, Ghotki, Khairpur, Shikarpur, Jacobabad, Kashmore and adjoining areas.

== Background ==
In August 2010, floods devastated northern Sindh, not only causing damage to housing infrastructure, but also destroying healthcare infrasture as well, people have limited access to health services; a number of health facilities in certain locations, particular Sukkur were damaged. People from many areas cannot acquire timely health services. Flocks of flood affected people particularly women and children started to pour into the medical relief camp setup by different donor agencies through NGOs in the Railway Hospital of the Sukkur city in Northern Sindh. In the hospital the Intensive Therapeutic Feeding Centre (ITFC) ward was set up – which started to provide treatment for severely malnourished children under the age of five who have medical complications. This was the time that the Authorities and donor agencies started planning to establish a state of the art health facility for children in Sukkur to cater their illness needs under one roof. In this backdrop a project was designed to provide specialized health care to children of Northern part of Sindh usually called upper Sindh, and adjoining areas of bordering provinces through a facility of 200 indoor beds, OPD (outpatient department) with state of the art diagnostic & emergency healthcare facility. For this the Republic of Korea announced to establish a children Hospital in Sukkur, and pledged 46 million US Dolar Economic Development Cooperation Fund (EDCF), as the soft loan to finance the facility. The commitment materialized and the children hospital in the name of Child Healthcare Institute was completed in first quarter of 2023 and made operational soon after it.
