= Sindh Institute of Skin Diseases =

- Government of Sindh
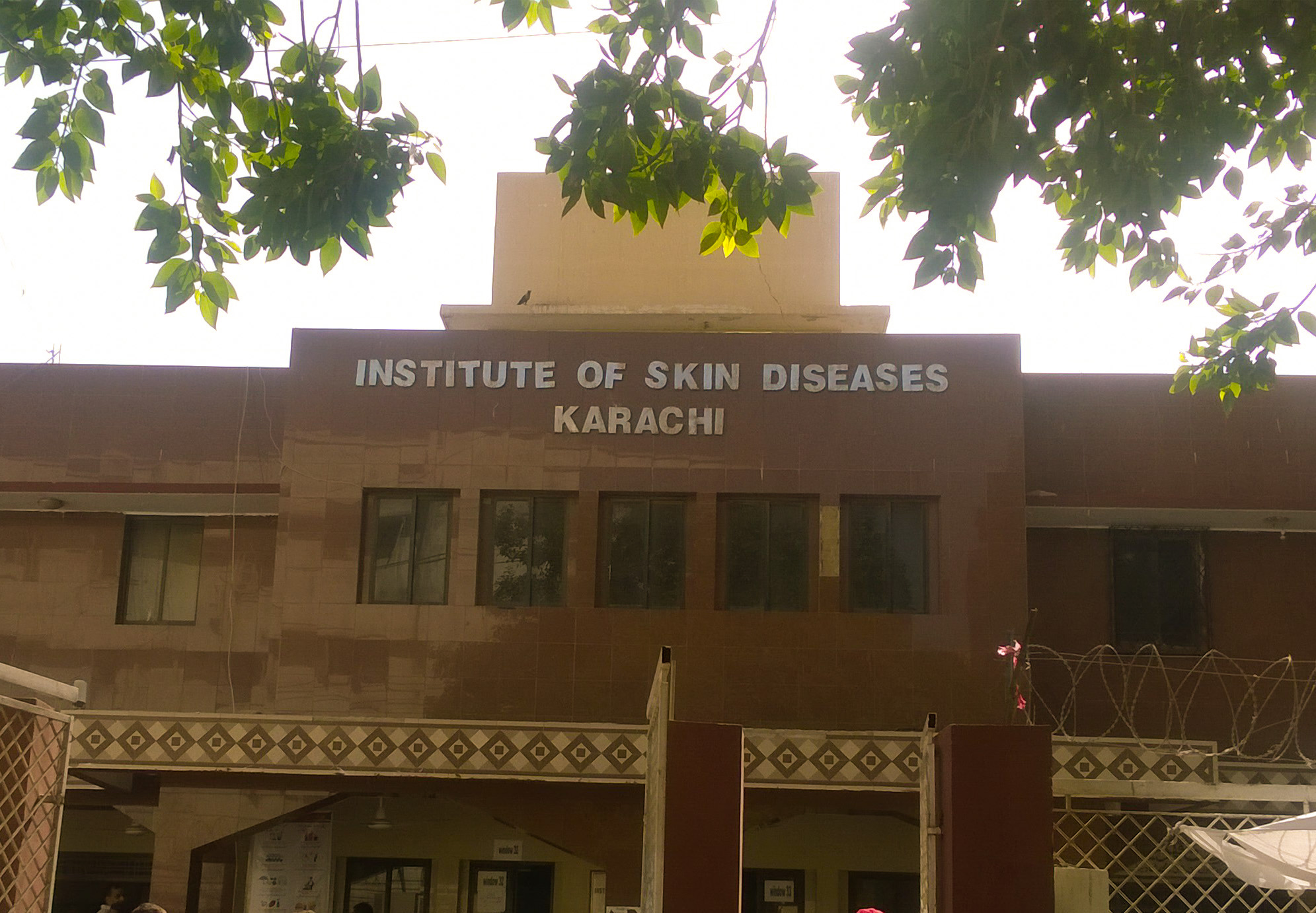

Geography
- Location: Soparivala Street، Regal Chowk, Karachi, Sindh Province, Pakistan
- Coordinates: 24.861435°N 67.024771°E

Organisation
- Funding: Public hospital
- Type: Specialist

Services
- Beds: 100
- Speciality: Dermatology

History
- Former names: Skin and Social Hygiene Centre
- Opened: 1990s

Links
- Website: https://isdsk.com.pk/
- Lists: Hospitals in Pakistan

The Sindh Institute of Skin Diseases (Urdu: سندھ ادارہ برائے امراضِ جِلد) known as Skin Hospital or Chamra Hospital (Urdu: چمڑہ ہسپتال) is a 50-bed dermatological hospital. It is the only public sector skin hospital in Karachi and is located in the Regal Chowk area.

This hundred-bed hospital specializes in skin diseases exclusively. It does not charge any fees for services and is governed by the Government of Sindh Province. Over 4,000 outpatients visit the hospital daily.

The hospital has a minor operation theater that is used for surgical procedures like excision and biopsies. The pathology laboratory has a facility for routine blood tests along with other special tests like fungal scraping, Tzanck smear, LD bodies, tests for syphilis, hepatitis B and C virus, HIV serology—all performed free of charge.

Procedures like electric cauterization, chemical cautery and cryotherapy are also performed. A facility for light therapy is also available.

The head of the hospital in 2018 was Iqbal Soomro.

The site where the hospital has been located since Pakistani independence was before 1947 a centre for treatment of socially transmitted diseases. After 1947, it was converted to a centre for skin and social hygiene and treatment of lepers. The 50-bed hospital for treatment of skin diseases was established in the 1990s.
