= PNS Rahat Hospital =

Pakistani military unit

Coordinates: 24.882334°N 67.092564°E

PNS Rahat
- Active: 1954 - Present
- Country: Pakistan
- Branch: [] Pakistan Navy
- Type: Military hospital
- Size: 100-bed Hospital in 2006
- Nickname: Pakistan Naval Hospital Complex-II
- Mottos: To conduct basic, mid career and specialized professional courses for Officers, AFNS Officers and Sailors of Medical Branch of Pakistan Navy and Allied Navies.
- Website: www.pnsrahat.gov.pk

Commanders
- Surgeon Commander of Pakistan Navy: Surg Capt Rana Kamran Saeed, Msc (HCA), NUMS

The Pakistan Navy Ship Rahat, or PNS Rahat Hospital, is a Pakistan Naval hospital and a medical treatment facility. It is located at Karsaz Road in Karachi, Sindh, Pakistan.

== History ==
PNS Rahat was established in 1954, by the United States Navy. It was commissioned on 20 October 1994, and Vice-Admiral Rashid Ahmad Khan was appointed its first Surgeon-General of the PNS Rahat. The hospital has a team of Pakistan Navy medical doctors, surgeons & paramedical staff(AFNS officers & Medical Technicians) providing the best services to patients.

The hospital was first upgraded in 1973.

== See also ==
- List of hospitals in Karachi
