= Children Hospital Multan =

Hospital in Multan, Pakistan

Geography
- Location: Multan, Pakistan
- Coordinates: 30°11′47″N 71°27′41″E

Organisation
- Type: Specialist
- Affiliated university: College of Physicians and Surgeons of Pakistan

Services
- Speciality: Children's hospital

Links
- Website: chm.punjab.gov.pk
- Lists: Hospitals in Pakistan

The Children's Hospital and The Institute of Child Health, Multan, also known as Children Hospital Complex Multan, is a children's hospital located in Multan, Pakistan.

== Accredited hospital ==
Children Hospital Complex, Multan is an accredited hospital by the College of Physicians and Surgeons of Pakistan.

== Building ==
The building has two parts. The older part was constructed during the British Raj and the newer part was constructed in 2012. The old building was previously used as the Civil Hospital Multan. At that time, both hospitals operated in one building. Now, the whole of the old building, since 2004, and the new building are under Children Complex Multan.

== Services ==
Hospital is a Tertiary Care Hospital. It provides following services:

- Pediatrics
- Pediatric Surgery
- Pediatrics Plastic Surgery
- Pediatrics Neurosurgery
- Radiology
- Pedriatic Urology
- Neonatology
- Nursery
