= Jinnah Postgraduate Medical Centre =

Pakistani hospital

Geography
- Location: Rafiqui Shaheed Road, Karachi Cantonment, Karachi, Sindh, Pakistan, Pakistan
- Coordinates: 24°51′N 67°03′E

Organisation
- Care system: Public
- Type: Teaching, District General Hospital
- Affiliated university: Sindh Medical College; Jinnah Sindh Medical University
- Patron: Muhammad Ali Jinnah

Services
- Emergency department: Yes
- Beds: 1600

History
- Former name: Jinnah Central Hospital

Links
- Website: www.jpmc.edu.pk
- Lists: Hospitals in Pakistan

The Jinnah Postgraduate Medical Centre (JPMC), formerly known as RAF Hospital No. 10, Pakistan Central Hospital, and Jinnah Central Hospital, is a public healthcare institute located at Rafiqui Shaheed Road in Karachi Cantonment area of Karachi, Sindh, Pakistan.

In 2017, approximately 1.8 million patients visited the hospital complex annually and it is considered one of the biggest government-operated hospitals in Karachi. Jinnah Hospital is one of the oldest, and biggest public health care hospitals in Karachi, a city of 15 million population.

The current Executive Director is Dr Khalid Sher.

== History ==
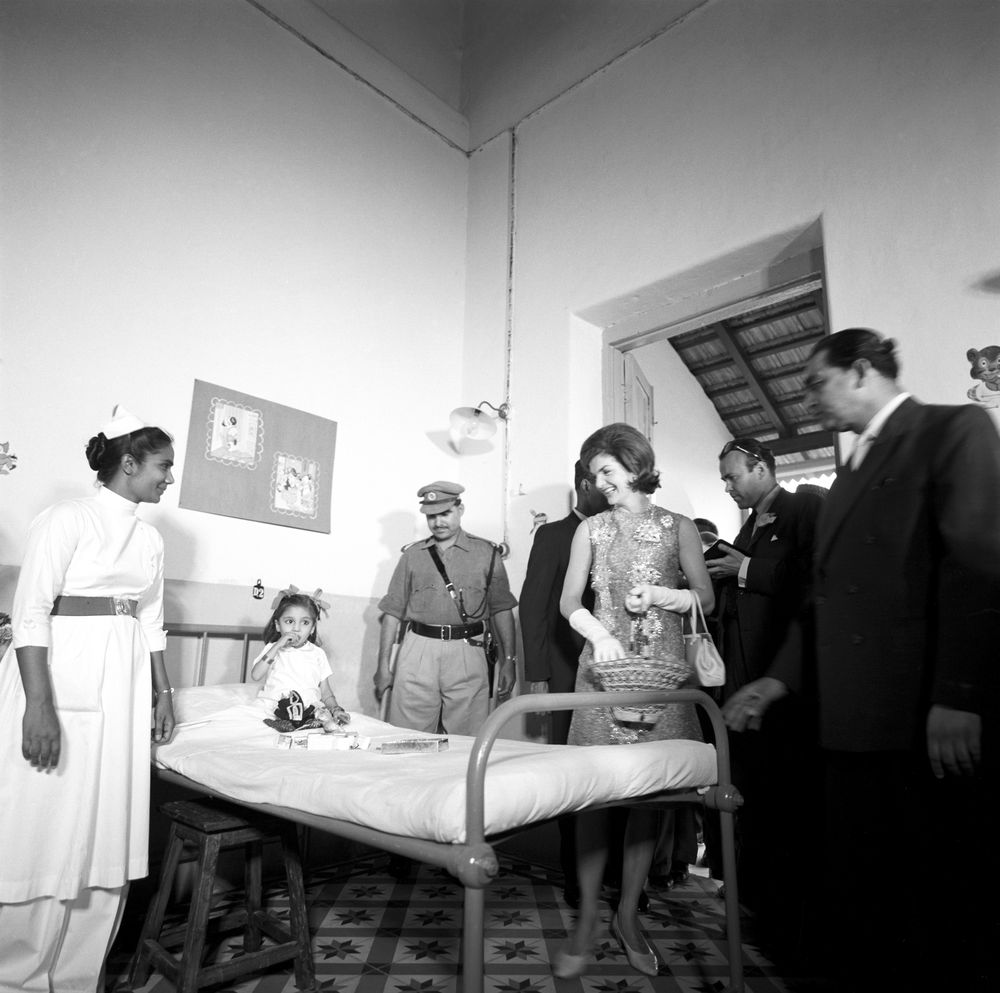
First Lady Jacqueline Kennedy Visits Children at Jinnah Central Hospital in Karachi, 1962

Jinnah Postgraduate Medical Centre (JPMC) was established in 1948 when RAF Hospital No. 10 was renamed Pakistan Central Hospital. In 1949, it was renamed Jinnah Central Hospital in honor of Muhammad Ali Jinnah.

In 1952, Dow Medical College was attached with the Jinnah Central Hospital. The hospital started with 100 beds and by 1959 it had expanded to 500 beds. The Basic Medical Sciences Institute (BMSI) was founded in 1958-59.

In 1962, Jinnah Central Hospital merged with Basic Medical Sciences Institute to form Jinnah Postgraduate Medical Centre, increasing its capacity to 1,250 beds. In 1978, the Cardiology and Cardiac Surgery units were transferred to the nearby National Institute of Cardiovascular Diseases (NICVD). By 1990, NICVD became an independent institution with its own director.

In 1979, General Zia-ul-Haq's government had made plans to upgrade this hospital into a federal university. So did former prime minister Nawaz Sharif who expressed the same sentiment about this big hospital and its adjoining complex in the early 1990s. Jinnah Hospital (JPMC) administration itself suggested the name Jinnah University of Health Sciences, if that actually happens.

In 2007, then Prime Minister of Pakistan Shaukat Aziz formally spoke at the foundation-stone laying ceremony of JPMC Medical Towers and a five-star hotel project.

In 2017, it had nearly 3,000 people working in this hospital. A state of the art, $25 million outpatient department is to open in 2018.

== Funding ==
The Jinnah Post Graduate Medical Centre (JPMC) in Karachi faces a tremendous number of problems, mainly lack of funds despite being a government-funded institute.

== See also ==
- Sindh Medical College
- Jinnah Sindh Medical University
