= Pak–China Friendship Hospital =

Hospital in Gwadar, Pakistan

Coordinates: 25.1865°N 62.3321°E

Pak-China Friendship Hospital

Geography
- Location: Near Judicial Complex Pishukan Ave Road Gwadar, Makran, Balochistan, Pakistan

Organisation
- Type: Public
- Network: Indus Hospital and Health Network

Services
- Beds: 300

History
- Constructed: December 2022
- Opened: November 2020

The GDA Pak-China Friendship Hospital is a hospital in the port city of Gwadar, Pakistan. The hospital was built as a component of the China-Pakistan Economic Corridor (CPEC) initiative, with financial backing provided by the Chinese government.

The hospital is run on a Public Private Partnership model at the moment and its administration and operations are managed by the Indus Hospital and Health Network. Head of Campus is Dr. Nasir Sheikh who is a Senior Healthcare Executive.

== GDA Hospital Gwadar ==
GDA Pak-China Friendship Hospital Gwadar

Geography
- Location: Makran, Balochistan, Pakistan

Organisation
- Type: Public
- Network: Indus Hospital and Health Network

Services
- Beds: 50 (Phase-I), 150 (PhaseII)

History
- Constructed: December 2020
- Opened: April 2024

Links
- Website: https://indushospital.org.pk/gda-hospital-gwadar/

The GDA Hospital Gwadar is a hospital in the port city of Gwadar, Pakistan. The hospital was built by Gwadar Port Authority and Government of Balochistan as a component of the Gwadar Port, managed by Indus Hospital and Health Network.

== Infrastructure ==
The hospital occupies 68 acres of land. The project is part of the proposed Phase-II development, which includes a 50-bed hospital to be constructed under the Gwadar Development Authority (GDA) Business Plan. As of 2022, one out of the six medical blocks, each designed to accommodate 50 beds, has been completed. Additionally, approximately 20% of the residential blocks are also finalised as part of the ongoing progress.

== Facilities ==
As per the project proposal, the upcoming phases will involve the construction of the remaining medical blocks, nursing and paramedical institutes, a medical college, a central laboratory, and various other allied facilities. These phases will also encompass the installation and supply of necessary medical equipment and machinery to enhance the hospital's capabilities and services. Currently there are 9 Clinical Specialties in the hospital which include Family Medicine, Internal and Emergency Medicine, Paediatric Medicine, General Surgery, Dentistry, Orthopaedics, Urology, Obstetrics and Gynaecology and Radiology. More services will be added soon.
