= Recep Tayyip Erdoğan Hospital, Muzaffargarh =

Pakistani hospital

Recep Tayyip Erdoğan Hospital, Muzaffargarh (RTEH)

Geography
- Location: 3-KM D.G Khan Road, Muzaffargarh, Punjab, Pakistan, Pakistan
- Coordinates: 30.07104°N 71.13136°E

Organisation
- Care system: Public

Services
- Emergency department: Yes
- Beds: 400

Links
- Website: https://indushospital.org.pk/rteh/

Recep Tayyip Erdoğan Hospital (RTEH), commonly referred to as Turkey Hospital, is a 342-bed tertiary care facility located in Muzaffargarh, Pakistan. It serves the local population and surrounding areas with a range of medical services. The hospital comprises an old campus, a mother and child hospital, and a new campus, which offers comprehensive medical and surgical allied services.

Established with financial support from Turkish President Recep Tayyip Erdoğan, the hospital was completed through the Turkish Cooperation and Coordination Agency. An expansion project initiated in 2017 significantly enhanced its capacity and was finalised in 2018. Additionally, RTEH has made strides in academic growth, offering a residency program in all major clinical specialties, accredited by the College of Physicians and Surgeons Pakistan.

== Services offered ==
- Accident & Emergency Room
- Daycare services
- Family Medicine Clinic
- General Medicine
- Pediatric Medicine & Nutrition
- General Surgery (Advance Laparoscopic Surgery)
- Cardiology
- Orthopedic
- Endocrinology (including Diabetes Care)
- Rheumatology
- Dermatology
- Ophthalmology
- Obstetrics & Gynecology
- Anesthesiology
- Oral & Maxillofacial
- Dialysis Services
- Physiotherapy & Rehabilitation
- Neonatology
- Urology
- Family Planning
- Laboratory
- Radiology
