= PNS Shifa Hospital =

Pakistan Navy's military hospital for medical training and certification

Coordinates: 24.837087°N 67.050172°E

PNS Shifa
- Logo of the hospital
- Active: September 25, 1953; 72 years ago
- Country: Pakistan
- Branch: Pakistan Navy
- Type: Military hospital
- Size: 886 Bedded Hospital in 2023
- Garrison/HQ: Clifton, Sindh, Pakistan
- Nickname: SHIFA

The Pakistan Navy Station Shifa (reporting name:PNS Shifa) is a military hospital located in the Clifton Cantonment in Karachi, Sindh, Pakistan. The medical education and training program as well as its accreditation is supported in conjection with the Bahria University in Karachi.

The Pakistan Navy identify the PNS Shifa its premium medical training facility and distinguished as "Pakistan Navy Medical Training School."

== History ==
=== Pakistan Navy Medical Training School ===
The Pakistan Navy Medical Training School (reporting name: PNMTS) is a direct reporting detachment and the military medical school that was established with the crucial help from the British Royal Navy's Medical Service in 1952. Pakistan Navy started this Training School named as Sick Berth Attendants in 1952. Since then, the PNS Shifa has been a military medical training institution and has been repurposed several times with Navy's intend to build the facility as a medical school for the Navy. PNMTS is a constituent unit of PNS SHIFA which is a 750-beded `A` Class hospital established in WW2 as Indian General Hospital, renamed as Combined Military Hospital after Independence and later on transferred to Pakistan Navy on 25th September 1953. In 1970, it was known as Medical Assistant Training School and, later, as "Pakistan Navy Nursing School" in 1982.

In 2006, it was renamed to its current name and began providing teachings and instructions to the postgraduate medical students when the facility was expanded from 600-beds to 800-beds..

The Pakistan Navy Medical Training School is an accredited medical school by the College of Physicians and Surgeons of Pakistan and the Pakistan Medical and Dental Council which certifies the Bachelor of Medicine, Bachelor of Surgery (MBBS) and the Bachelor of Science in Nursing (BSN) degree programs. Unlike its sister college, Army Medical College in Rawalpindi, the Navy Medical School's admission and enrollment is restricted to the military personnel.

On 30th July 2016, the hospital received ISO-9001-2008 certificate.

== See also ==
- List of hospitals in Karachi
