= Khairpur Medical College =

Medical college in Sindh, Pakistan

Khairpur Medical College Khairpur Mir's
- کالج طبی خیرپور خیرپور میر
- Motto: Service to Humanity
- Type: Medical College
- Established: 2015
- Affiliations: People University of Medical And Health Sciences
- Principal: Khush Muhammad sohu
- Administrative staff: 200
- Students: 500
- Location: Khairpur Mir's, Pakistan
- Nickname: KMC
- Website: Official website

Khairpur Medical College is an 8th public medical institution located in the city of Khairpur, Sindh, Pakistan.

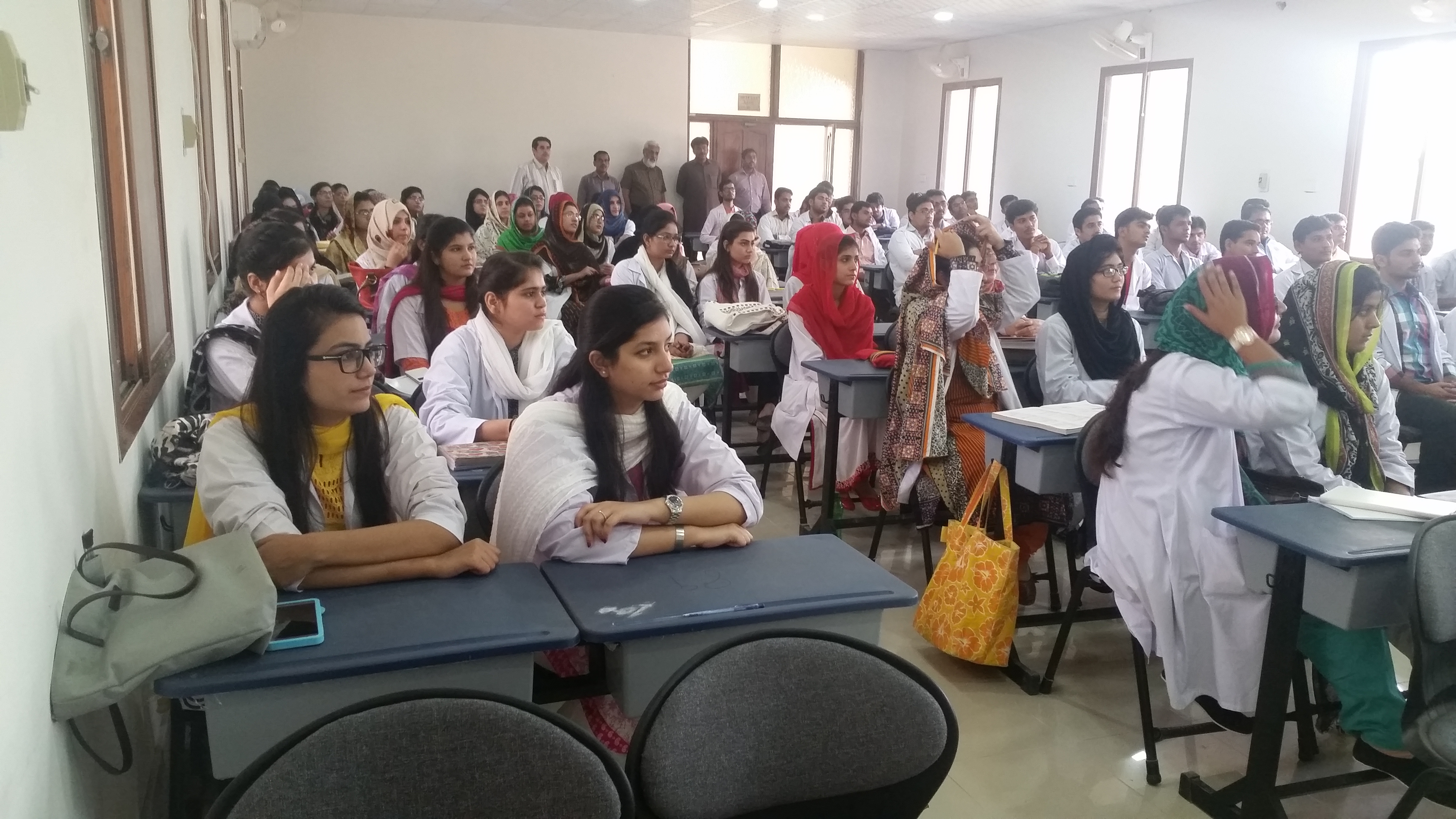
Khairpur Medical College 02 Batch During Class

== History ==
The university began construction on Saturday, 29 December 2012. The first principal was Prof Dr. Mashoor Alam Shah. Dr. Mumtaz Ali Channa was the first Administrator. They started the mission to establish the college at an old ruined elementary college. Five staff were hired through LUMHS. College is Recognised By Pakistan Medical Commission on 21-02-2020

The first 100 medical students matriculated in 2015. The college is affiliated with Peoples University of Medical Health Sciences Nawabshah.

== Leaders ==
=== Principals ===
- Mashoor Alam Shah, 2012-2016
- Asadullah Mahar, 2017–present

=== Vice principals ===
- Allaudin Abro, 2015-2016
- Nazar Hussain Shah, 2016–2018
- Khush Mohammad Sohu, 2018–present

== Facilities ==
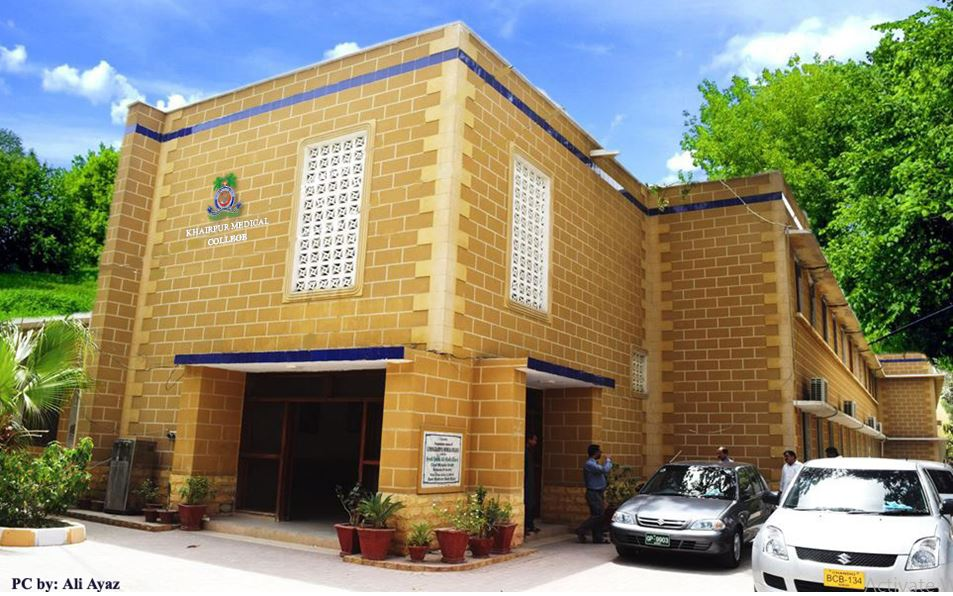
Main Campus

The college has 7 Departments, three at the main building and four at the clinical hospital side at civil hospital Khairpur. Each Department has its own lecture Hall, laboratory, Tutorials, demonstration room and seminar library equipped with all the modern teaching aids and multimedia. Khairpur Medical College has one girls hostel and a New Plan of construction has started at 28 acres at the KTN plot .

== Library ==
A well-equipped library along with audio-visual facilities for CD's, data projection system and internet facilities is available for use of students and staff.

== Admissions ==
Khairpur Medical College first enrolled 100 students yearly. Enrollment later rose to 500 students.

== Quality management ==
The main features of the quality management policy are:

- Development and application of best and innovative teaching practices
- Appropriate provision for faculty and staff induction, training, motivation and development
- Obtain and respond to customer feedback through effective communication

== Departments ==
=== Basic Sciences ===
- Anatomy
- Physiology
- Biochemistry
- Pharmacology
- Pathology
- Forensic Medicine
- Community Medicine

=== Clinical Sciences ===
- Medicine
- Surgery
- Gynaecology
- Paediatrics
- Ophthalmology
- ENT
- Radiology
- Anesthesia
- Paediatrics Surgery
- Plastic Surgery
- Nephrology
- Orthopedics
- Cardiology
- Pulmonology
- Dermatology
- Psychiatry
- Obstetrics

== Curriculum ==
First Professional Year - Part I and II:

- Anatomy, Embryology and Histology
- Human Physiology
- Medical Biochemistry

Second Professional Year:

- Forensic Medicine and Toxicology
- General Pathology and Microbiology
- Pharmacology and Therapeutics

Third Professional Year:

- Community Medicine
- Ophthalmology
- Otorhinolaryngology (ENT)
- Special Pathology

Fourth Professional Year:

- Gynecology and Obstetrics
- Medicine, Psychiatry and Dermatology
- Pediatrics
- Surgery, Orthopedics and Anesthesia
