= Civil Hospital, Hyderabad =

Pakistani hospital

Geography
- Location: Hyderabad, Sindh, Pakistan
- Coordinates: 25°24′01″N 68°22′02″E

Organisation
- Care system: Public
- Type: Academic
- Affiliated university: Liaquat University of Medical & Health Sciences

Services
- Standards: Tertiary
- Emergency department: Yes
- Beds: 2200

History
- Former names: Civil Hospital, Hyderabad, Liaquat Medical College Hospital (LMCH)
- Construction started: 1881

The Civil Hospital, Hyderabad, also known as Liaquat University Hospital (LUH), is a 2200-bed tertiary care hospital in Hyderabad, Sindh. It is one of the largest teaching hospitals affiliated with Liaquat University of Medical and Health Sciences, Jamshoro, the first medical university of public sector in Pakistan. The hospital serves Sindh and the neighboring province of Balochistan.

== History ==
Civil Hospital, Hyderabad construction was completed with seven wards by 1894 at a cost of 88,173 rupees.

A medical school had also subsequently started in the premises of the hospital. The medical school was upgraded to the status of a degree college, Sindh Medical College, in 1945. The medical college was later shifted to Karachi and renamed as Dow Medical College in order to avoid deregulation by University of Bombay. In place of it, Liaquat Medical College was started in 1951 in Civil Hospital which was later relocated to its new campus in Jamshoro.

In 1963, another branch of the hospital in Jamshoro, Liaquat Medical College Hospital, designed by an Italian architect, was completed with 430 beds and started functioning as a teaching hospital.

== Services ==
Initially established in 1881 to provide basic health facilities, the hospital has 2200 beds across various departments located in Hyderabad and Jamshoro.

The clinical departments include:

- Department of Internal Medicine
- Paediatrics
- Cardiology
- Pulmonology
- Dermatology
- Family Medicine
- Gastroenterology
- Nuclear Medicine
- Nephrology
- Psychiatry
- General Surgery
- Trauma & Orthopaedic Surgery
- Accident & Emergency
- Plastic Surgery
- Paediartric Surgery
- NeuroSurgery
- Obs & Gynae
- Cardiothoracic surgery
- Vascular Surgery
- Urology and Radiology
