= Civil Hospital Nawabshah =

People's Medical College Hospital Nawabshah

Geography
- Location: Nawabshah, Sindh, Pakistan
- Coordinates: 26.2437°N 68.4051°E

Organisation
- Care system: Public
- Type: Academic
- Affiliated university: People's University of Medical & Health Sciences for Women

Services
- Standards: Tertiary
- Emergency department: Yes
- Beds: 1500

History
- Former name: Nawabshah Medical College Hospital
- Construction started: 1915

The Civil Hospital, Nawabshah, also known as People's Medical University Hospital (PMUH), is a 1500-bed tertiary care hospital in Nawabshah, Pakistan. It is one of the largest teaching hospitals affiliated with People's University of Medical and Health Sciences, the first medical university of public sector in Pakistan. The hospital serves Sindh and the neighboring province of Balochistan.
