= Bacha Khan Medical Complex Swabi =

Medical facility in Pakistan

- Government of Khyber Pakhtunkhwa

Geography
- Location: Shahmansoor, Swabi District, Khyber Pakhtunkhwa, Pakistan
- Coordinates: 34.08020°N 72.45637°E

Services
- Emergency department: Yes

Links
- Website: bkmcs.edu.pk

Bacha Khan Medical Complex Swabi (BKMCS) is a medical facility located in Shahmansoor, Swabi District, in the Khyber Pakhtunkhwa province of Pakistan. The hospital is named after the Pashtun leader and political figure Bacha Khan.

The complex offers medical services, including emergency care, inpatient and outpatient care, diagnostic services, and specialized treatments such as surgery, cardiology, and neurology.

It also serves as a training center for medical students and residents in partnership with local universities and medical schools.
