= Saifee Hospital, Karachi =

Hospital in Karachi

- Saifee Hospital Trust

Geography
- Location: Hyderi, North Nazimabad, Karachi, Sindh, Pakistan
- Coordinates: 24.931362°N 67.038315°E

Organisation
- Care system: Private
- Type: District General, Community
- Patron: Dr. Syedna Mohammad Burhanuddin and Dr. Syedna Taher Saifuddin

Services
- Emergency department: Yes
- Beds: 193

History
- Former name: Sughrabai Millwallah Hospital

Links
- Lists: Hospitals in Pakistan

The Saifee Hospital, is a private hospital located in the suburb of Hyderi, North Nazimabad, Karachi.

This hospital is close to 18 to 20 other hospitals, including Ziauddin Hospital.

== See also ==
- List of hospitals in Karachi
