= South City Hospital =

Private hospital in Karachi, Sindh, Pakistan

Coordinates: 24.814188°N 67.022437°E

South City Hospital is a private hospital located in Karachi, Sindh, Pakistan.

Founded in 2004, the hospital has emerged as a popular medical treatment center in the city.

== Size ==
The hospital is built on a space of more than 3,000 square yards accommodating over 200 in-patient at a time. South City has a team of more than 100 consultants, and also includes a genetics and IVF centre.

== Facilities ==
South City Hospital follows the model of combining luxury with medical treatment, and charges higher prices that other similar hospitals in Karachi. The hospital includes a CCU, ICU, Operating Theatre, Cardiac Unit, Radiology Unit, Laboratory and multiple Pharmacies.

== COVID-19 ==
South City was designated by the Government of Pakistan as one of the first COVID-19 medical centers. It is currently offering COVID-19 vaccinations.
