= Benazir Institute Urology and Transplantation =

Coordinates: 26.2453°N 68.4023°E

Benazir Institute of Urology & Transplantation (BIUT)
- BIUT Complex Benazirabad

Geography
- Location: BIUT Benazirabad Near Khoja Garden Nawabshah, Shaheed Benazirabad, Sindh, Pakistan

Organisation
- Type: Medical teaching
- Affiliated university: SUIT

Services
- Emergency department: Yes
- Beds: 300

History
- Founded: 2023 by Dr Azra Pechuho

Links
- Website: www.siut.org

Benazir Institute of Urology & Transplantation (BIUT) is located in Benazirabad (formally Nawabshah), Shaheed Benazirabad District of Sindh province, Pakistan. It was founded as a 300-bed tertiary care hospital with the goal of giving patients with kidney and related disorders free medical coverage locally. Previously, residents of the Shaheed Benazirabad district and its surrounding districts had to go to Karachi and other cities for such treatment.
