= Chandka Medical College =

Medical college in Pakistan

Coordinates: 27.5521°N 68.1983°E

Chandka Medical College چانڈکا طبی کالج
- Motto: Training for Health
- Established: April 1973
- Academic affiliations: HEC, PMDC, GMC, WHO
- Principal: Prof. Dr. Zameer Ahmed Soomro
- Address: Main CMC Road & High Court Road, Larkana, Sindh, Pakistan
- Website: www.cmc.edu.pk

Chandka Medical College Sindhi: چانڈکا طبی ڪاليج, or CMC), established on 20 April 1973, is a public sector medical college located in Larkana, Sindh, Pakistan. It also provides post graduate training to doctors. It provides tertiary medical care facilities to upper Sindh and half of the Balochistan, and medical education for the students of Larkana Division.

It is one of the constituent colleges of Shaheed Mohtarma Benazir Bhutto Medical University (SMBBMU). The school has a large and experienced faculty to support its mission of education, research, and clinical care. Faculty members hold appointments in the basic science departments and in the clinical departments of CMC Teaching Hospital as well as other offices in Larkana. There are approximately 100+ full-time faculty members consisting of demonstrators, assistant, associate, and full professors at CMC Larkana.

== History ==
Prime Minister Zulfikar Ali Bhutto initiated a project to found three medical colleges in Sindh province; Chandka Medical College was the first. It is in a building that formerly housed a Government Polytechnic Institute Larkana. Professor Ali Mohammad Ansari was appointed as the first principal of the college. CMC admitted its first batch of 150 students in 1973.

CMC has since grown to a full-fledged medical university. The new name of CMC is now Shaheed Mohtarma Benazir Bhutto Medical University after the name of the slain Benazir Bhutto who was twice the Prime Minister of Pakistan.

Professor and surgeon Dr. Sikandar Ali Sheikh became its first vice chancellor on 9 July 2009.

== See also ==
- University of Sindh
