= Sindh Institute of Cardiovascular Diseases, Karachi Chapter =

Pakistani health organisation

National Institute of Cardiovascular Diseases قومی انسٹيٹيوٹ قلبی امراض
- Heart care hospitals
- Type: Public
- Established: 1963
- Location: Sindh, Pakistan
- Website: nicvd.org

Sindh Institute of Cardiovascular Diseases (SICVD); (Urdu: قومی انسٹيٹيوٹ قلبی امراض) in collaboration with the Government of Sindh are a chain of health care centres located in Sindh, Pakistan.

NICVD has become the only healthcare facility in the world to have performed over 4,000 cardiac surgeries and 8,197 primary PCIs, over 12,000 procedures [and] dozens of cardiac implants, all free of charge at its main centre in Karachi and eight satellite centres spread all over Sindh.

== History ==
Emerging from the small Central Heart Clinic in Ward 10 of Jinnah Postgraduate Medical Centre (JPMC) Karachi in 1956. NICVD has been the primary heart-care provider for Pakistanis for over 65 years.

With support from the Government of Pakistan, USAID and the Japanese Government, NICVD became a fully functional tertiary cardiac-care centre on 14 August 1971. For the following eight years, NICVD remained a Non-Governmental Organization (NGO) but in 1979 it was nationalized by the Government of Pakistan and became an Autonomous Body under the Federal Ministry of Health.

Since its inception in 1963, the National Institute of Cardiovascular Diseases (NICVD) has played a pivotal role in caring for patients with heart disease in Pakistan. NICVD is the first tertiary cardiac care institute in South Asia as well as the flagship facility for cardiology in Pakistan with a focus on superior care for patients, education and training for medical professionals, and research and development in cardiology.

NICVD caters to the cardiovascular needs of a vast majority of patients from all provinces of Pakistan as well as patients from other neighboring countries. It is responsible for training the bulk of local cardiac physicians, nurses and paramedics throughout the country.

To extend the state of the art health facilities to the doorsteps of poor cardiac patients whether belonging to different localities of metropolis Karachi or to the far-flung parts of Pakistan, the Government of Sindh decided that cardiac facility should be brought out of Karachi and expanded. For this National Institute of Cardiovascular Diseases has introduced a new era of heart healthcare by introducing Chest pain Units and Satellite Centres.

Apart from Karachi where the main facility of the NICVD exists, the institute has been operating through its satellite centres in nine other parts of Sindh, including Larkana, Tando Muhammad Khan, Sehwan, Hyderabad, Sukkur, Nawabshah, Mithi, Khairpur and Liyari.

On 30 March 2022, the Sindh government has changed the name from the National Institute of Cardiovascular Diseases (NICVD) into the Sindh Institute of Cardiovascular Diseases (SICVD).

On 29 March 2025, CM Murad Ali Shah approved the merger of NICVD and SICVD. CM orders preparation of NICVD-SICVD merger plan within three months.

== NICVD Satellite Center Benazirabad ==
On 8 July 2024, a memorandum of understanding (MOU) was signed for the new NICVD Satellite Center in Benazirabad. This state-of-the-art cardiac facility will offer comprehensive services similar to those provided at the main center in Karachi. Once operational, it will provide major cardiac care, particularly interventional cardiology, to the people of Sindh at their doorstep free of charge. This hospital is set to become the largest cardiac center in Central Sindh after the NICVD in Karachi and Sukkur.

== NICVD Satellite Center Tando Mohammad Khan ==
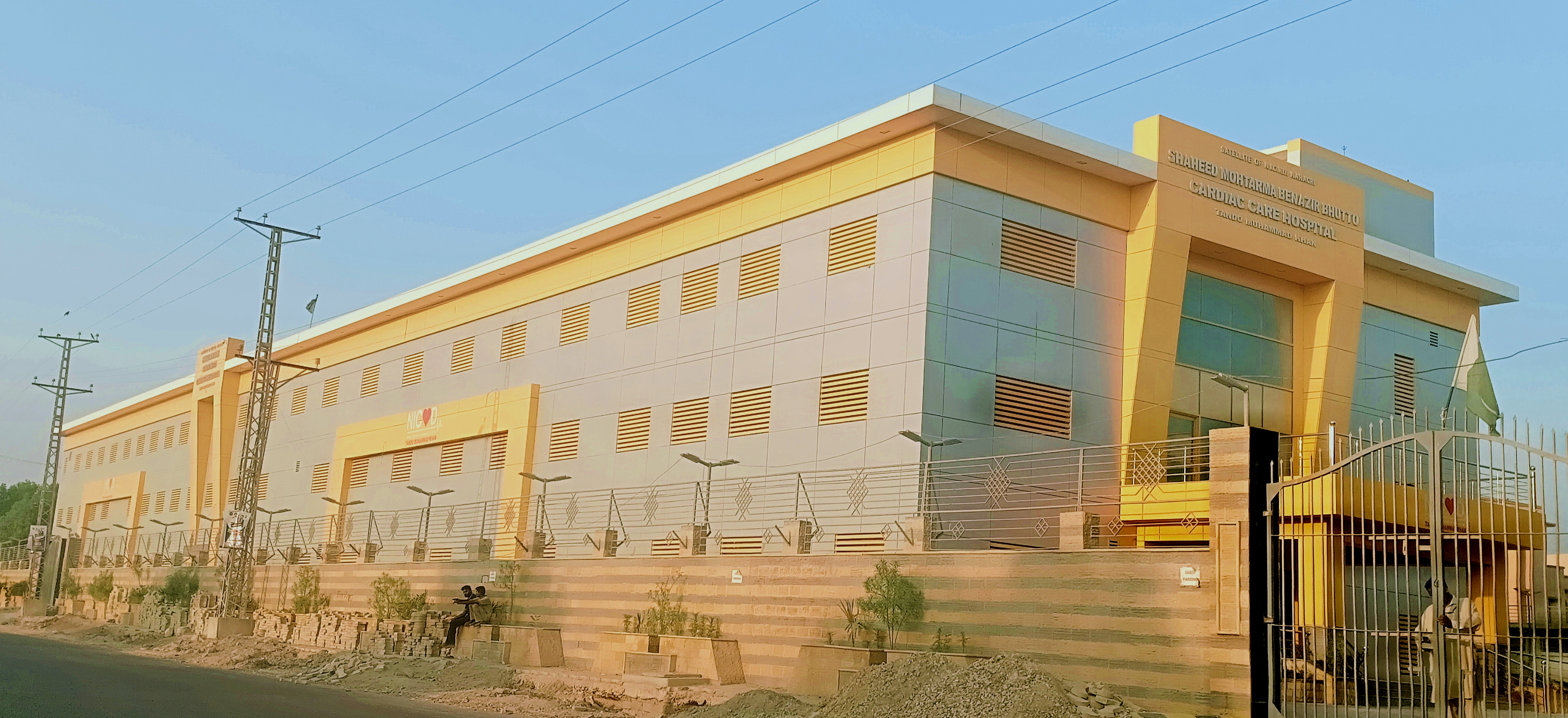
National Institute of Cardiovascular Diseases (Sindh)

Tando Muhammad Khan is located 35 km from Hyderabad on Badin Road. NICVD Satellite Center Tando Mohammad Khan was established and was inaugurated on Thursday 19 October 2017. Services at NICVD Tando Mohammad Khan include cardiac emergency, consulting clinics, interventional cardiology and critical care for cardiac patients. The paediatric cardiothoracic surgical team at the National Institute of Cardiovascular Diseases (NICVD) in Tando Muhammad Khan performed its first successful open heart surgery on a toddler on Wednesday 9 September 2020. Over 150 adult cardiac surgeries have been performed at the 100-bed facility, which provides cardiac healthcare services free of charge, since its establishment.

== NICVD Satellite Center Sukkur ==
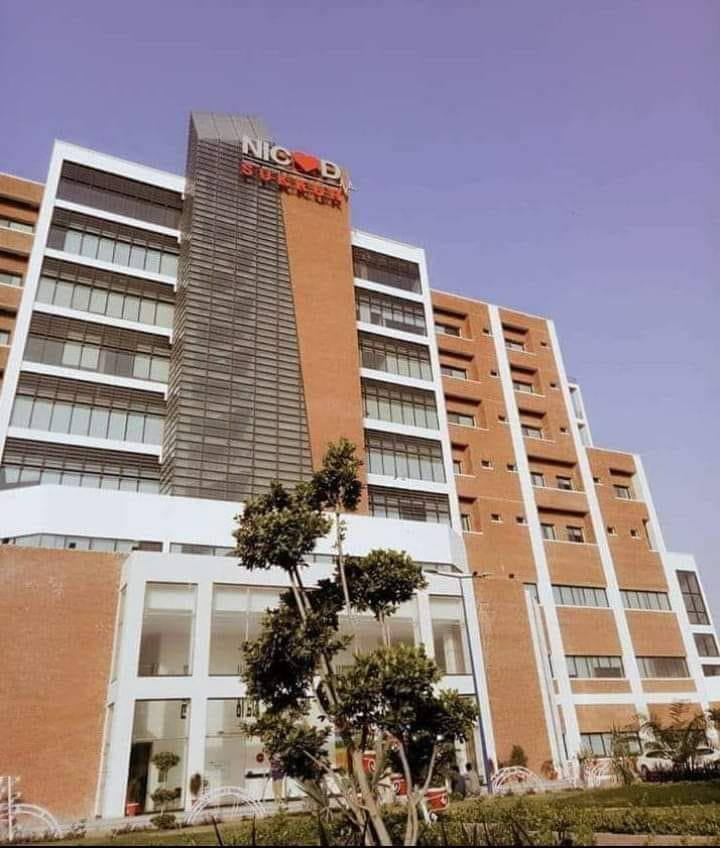
NICVD Sukkur Satellite Center, Sukkur

On 24 February 2018, the fifth satellite centre of the NICVD was inaugurated. This 300 bed state-of-the-art cardiac facility in Sukkur has full facilities as in the main Karachi center. where services will be provided free-of-charge, It is a complete cardiac hospital of international standard and is providing major cardiac facilities, especially interventional cardiology, to the people of Sindh at their doorstep for free. It is the largest cardiac centre in Sindh after the NICVD in Karachi.

== Facilities ==
This hospital aims to serve the population of northern Sindh and adjoining areas of south Punjab and Balochistan with Emergency, Cath Lab, CCU and Consulting Clinics will provide quality treatment, advanced diagnosis, 24×7 cardiac emergency facilities, adult and pediatric cardiology, echocardiography services, coronary artery angioplasty and angiographies 100% free of cost, by internationally and local trained cardiologists, paramedical staff and technicians.

=== Adult heart Surgery ===
The Sukkur satellite center of National Institute of Cardiovascular Diseases (NICVD), performed its first open heart surgery under the supervision of Prof. Fazle Rabbi on 18 March 2018. The first open heart ASD closure was done of a female patient with an atrial septal defect (ASD) on Saturday and it was followed by two more open heart surgeries.

=== Paediatric heart surgery ===
A two-member team of the Paeds cardiac surgery department at the National Institute of Cardiovascular Diseases (NICVD), Sukkur, on Thursday 19 March 2020 successfully performed the open-heart surgery procedure on a five-year-old child.successfully performed the open-heart surgery procedure on a five-year-old child.

Almost one year later, for the first time an atrial septal defect (hole in heart) surgery has been performed through device instead of open heart surgery successfully by Paediatric Cardiology team at NICVD Sukkur.

=== Modern labs ===
On the first anniversary of NICVD Sukkur an electrophysiology lab and the second Cath Lab (catheterization lab) was inaugurated on Thursday 4 February 2019. The lab would serve a larger number of patients requiring pacemaker and other implants and angioplasties from northern Sindh, southern Punjab and Balochistan. The NICVD Sukkur, he said has now become one of the best cardiac-care hospitals in the region where patients get quality treatment free of cost.

== Recognition ==
- Accredited by the College of Physicians and Surgeons of Pakistan.
