= Faisal Masud =

Former vice-chancellor of King Edward Medical University (1954 - 2019)

- Born: 16 October 1954; Gujrat, Pakistan
- Died: 16 August 2019 (aged 64); Lahore, Pakistan
- Education: MBBS (Nishtar), FRCP, FCPS (Pak)
- Alma mater: Nishtar Medical College, Multan; Royal College of Physicians, Edinburgh
- Occupation: Endocrinologist
- Organization: Punjab Human Organ Transplantation Authority (PHOTA)
- Known for: Expertise in Medicine and Endocrinology
- Awards: Tamgha-e-Imtiaz (Medal of Excellence) Award by the President of Pakistan in 2013

Faisal Masud (Urdu: فيصل مسعود) (16 October 1954 – 16 August 2019) was a Pakistani endocrinologist.

He served as the founding principal at Services Institute of Medical Sciences affiliated with the Services Hospital in Lahore, Pakistan. He also served as the vice-chancellor of the University of Health Sciences and a vice-chancellor of the King Edward Medical University, Lahore (January 2013–February 2017).

== Education and career ==
Faisal obtained his MBBS degree in 1976, from Nishtar Medical College, Multan. He became a member of Royal College of Physicians, Edinburgh, Glasgow and London in 1982 and a Fellow of Royal College of Physicians, Edinburgh in 1998, where his area of interest was endocrinology. He started his teaching career from Allama Iqbal Medical College in 1982 and then moved on to teach at King Edward Medical College, Lahore, and Services Institute of Medical Sciences, Lahore.

He was passionate in his belief that the medical colleges and universities should adopt liberalism. He encouraged basic research and sometimes referred to clinical research as mere "stamp collecting effort". Although he himself started as a clinical researcher with numerous research publications to his credit, over time his emphasis shifted more towards the basic research. He wanted to create a multi-disciplinary research group as he often said, "the best research proposals come from cross insemination of ideas from unrelated fields". He managed to create an endowment fund for SIMS to provide annual research grants to the promising young researchers. In this process, he established a system of grant assessment and research audit. This effort resulted in the birth of the research journal at SIMS, named Esculapio.

In 2003, in the face of stiff administrative opposition, he started a comprehensive diabetes management center at services hospital Lahore where he was serving as a professor at that time. His daughter helped him write a software for this center to create a huge database of more than 84,000 patients with diabetes. This center was upgraded with philanthropic support in 2004 to the full-fledged department of endocrinology and metabolism to impart post-graduate endocrine training. In recognition of this effort, College of Physicians and Surgeons Pakistan elected him as its first fellow in the field of endocrinology in 2010.

== Role in Dengue epidemic 2011 ==
In 2011, when the province of Punjab faced an epidemic of dengue fever, he was appointed by the government to head a group of experts to draw up treatment protocols and algorithms for its management. This group of experts DEAG (Dengue Expert Advisory Group) was instrumental in training of family physicians, doctors and paramedics and publication of GCP (Good clinical practice) guidelines for the management of dengue fever. For his efforts during this epidemic he was decorated with Tamgha-e-Imtiaz in 2013. Soon afterwards he got promoted in recognition of the meritorious services rendered by him during the epidemic. Later he helped the KP government to establish similar medical protocols for containing the Dengue outbreaks in the province.

== PIC related drug reaction ==
In early December 2011, soon after the end of dengue epidemic, Lahore hospitals started receiving patients with bone marrow suppression. Most of them tested positive for dengue IgM raising a possibility of some aberrant form of dengue disease. He was the first one to raise alarm about the possibility of a drug reaction, pointing to the common denominator of the consumption of PIC (Punjab Institute of Cardiology) dispensed medications. He strongly disagreed with the possibility of it being a variant of Dengue. He was a member appointed to inquire into this matter. He was proven right when the problem was traced to a heart medicine that was heavily contaminated with antimalarial (pyrimethamine) which is known for its hematological side effects.

== Hospital automation and EMR ==
His enthusiasm to embrace IT as a tool for effective management and for gleaning authentic data for resource allocation was greeted with muted scepticism, considering the previous attempts at other institutions were the absolute failure. Within three years he not only prepared the EMR and hospital management software but also got it implemented. When asked he once said, "changing the hardened attitudes in a public sector establishment is the biggest challenge".

Although his administrative abilities were doubted, he proved his critics wrong when he established Services Institute of Medical Sciences, in the face of stiff opposition. He achieved phenomenal success in creating acceptability of the institution which was recognised by Pakistan Medical and Dental Council, University of Health Sciences and College of Physicians and Surgeons of Pakistan. Results declared by the independent examining body, UHS, show extraordinary achievements of SIMS. He believed in the need for meticulous planning for the future while drawing up development plans. His development plans often faced bureaucratic obstacles for being too ambitious. He was relegated to political backwaters because he was often bracketed with the outgoing government of PML-Q of 2008; but in spite of the fiscal constraints he managed to upgrade the infra-structure including OPD tower, radiology block in addition to the three-story air-conditioned waiting hall, Accidents and Emergency Department with 16 slice CT Scanner thereby almost doubling the covered area of the hospital. His interest in the endocrine disorders was, perhaps, the reason behind the establishment of assisted conception Unit at SHL. Although a physician by training, his faculty members often called him a surgeon by temperament. Not surprisingly he invested disproportionately in surgical sector upgrading ENT, Urology, General surgery, Ophthalmology Department and operation theatres.

== Early and personal life ==
Born in a conservative family of Kashmiri origin, with ancestral base at Shopian, Faisal Masud was educated at different schools as his father, who was a civil servant, got posted to different places all over Punjab, Pakistan. In spite of achieving top merit in his FSc, he opted to study at Nishtar Medical College, Multan to great displeasure of his father. During his university time, he was not one of the most regular students but still managed to achieve top academic scores. Once asked later in his life about his ambivalent attitude, he remarked, "they didn't cater for my needs". His education in the UK was marked by his training by his mentor. He often confessed to the great influence of his mentor, after whom he modelled himself. There he met his wife to be. He was an active writer of English short stories.

== Death ==
On 16 August 2019, Faisal Masud suffered a cardiac arrest and was shifted to Iqra Medical Complex, where he was pronounced dead. He was involved as the founding Director General at the Punjab Human Organ Transplantation Authority (PHOTA) at the time of his death.

== Research Papers & Publications ==
- Glycaemic behaviour of rice & wheat as a part of mixed Pakistani diet, Pakistan Journal of Medical Research, Vol. 28, No.1, Jan–March 1989
- The Profile of patients with Ischaemic Heart Disease, Pakistan Journal of Medical Research, Vol. 29, No. 2, April–June 1990
- Pheochromocytoma, Pakistan Journal of Medical Research, Vol. 26, No. 2, April–June 1987
- Secondary Failure with sulphonylureas, Biomedica, Vol. 9, July- December 1990
- Combination Treatment of Type II Diabetes, Biomedica, Vol. 10, Jan–June 1991
- Comparison of metabolic control achieved with twice a day beef versus human Insulin in Pakistani population, Specialist, Vol. 8, No. 3, April–June 1992
- Assessment of metabolic profile and Body Mass Index in Type II diabetes treated with Metformin and Insulin, Specialist, Vol. 9, No. 1, Oct–Dec 1992
- Insulin Sparing Effect of glibenclamide in poorly controlled type ii diabetics and its effect on body mass index, Specialist:, Vol. 9, No. 2, Jan–March 1993
- Cutting needle thyroid biopsy in the preoperative evaluation of isotopically cold, solitary, solid thyroid nodule Specialist, Vol. 9, No. 3, April–June 1993
- Serological markers of Hepatitis-C Virus infection in patients with Chronic Active Hepatitis, Pakistan Journal of Gastroenterology: Vol. 6. No. 1. 1992
- Efficacy of alpha Interferon in the treatment of Hepatitis C positive Chronic Active Hepatitis (CAH), Pakistan Journal of Gastroenterology, Vol. 7. No. 1, 1993
- Autonomic dysfunction of GI system in the diabetic population, Pakistan Journal of Gastroenterology, Vol. 8. No. 1, 1994
- Acanthosis Nigricans in non-insulin dependent diabetes mellitus, Specialist:, Vol. 11, No. 3, April–June 1995
- Insulin resistance and hyper-insulinaemia in patients with ischaemic heart disease, Specialist, Vol. 12, No. 3, April–June 1996
- Review: Breaking insulin resistance with thiazolidinediones, Esculapio, Vol.1, No. 1. April–June 2005
- Can vascular pathology in cerebral and coronary fields predict peripheral artery disease in a cohort of diabetic patients?, Esculapio, Vol.1, No. 2, July–Sep 2005
- The effect of age and lipid profiles on peripheral vascular disease in a cohort of diabetic patients Esculapio, Vol.1, No. 3, Oct–Dec 2005
- Anthropometric measurements as a determinant and predictor of peripheral vascular disease in a cohort of diabetic patients, Esculapio, Vol.1, No. 3, Oct–Dec 2005
- Helicobacter pylori- role in decompensation of patients with HCV-positive chronic liver disease, Esculapio, Vol.1, No. 3, Oct–Dec 2005
- Role of clinical diagnosis to ascertain the type of stroke, Esculapio, Vol. 1, No. 4, Jan–March 2006
- Vitamin D levels for optimum bone health, Singapore Med J, Vol. 48, No. 3, 2007
- Topical therapy for neuropathic diabetic foot ulcers, Esculapio: Vol. 1, No.4. Jan–March 2006
