= Hamid Mahmood Butt =

Pakistani ophthalmologist

- Education: M.B, B.S, FRCP, FCPS
- Occupation: Ophthalmologist

Hamid Mahmood Butt (Urdu: حامد محمود بٹ) is the former principal of Services Institute of Medical Sciences, chair of Department of Ophthalmology and Visual Sciences, and patron of Services Hospital. He served as the ex-Chair of Department of Ophthalmology and Visual Sciences at Fatima Jinnah Medical College.

On August 1, 2017, the Specialized Healthcare and Medical Education Department made him an Officer on Special Duty on administrative basis following the strike by the young doctors.
