= Mahmood Ayaz =

Pakistani academic

Mahmood Ayyaz
- Born: 17 October 1960 (age 65); Khyber Pakhtunkhwa, Pakistan
- Education: Allama Iqbal Medical College
- Occupation: Professor of Surgery. Surgeon
- Known for: General Surgery, Laparoscopic, Endocrine, Hepatobiliary, Robotic and Vascular Surgery
- Notable work: Director, National Residency Program, College of Physicians and Surgeons Pakistan; National Course Director for Advanced Trauma Life Support
- Awards: Sitara-e- Imtiaz

Mahmood Ayyaz (Urdu: محمود ایاز) is the Vice Chancellor of the King Edward Medical University, Lahore, Pakistan. He was the ex-principal of Services Institute of Medical Sciences and patron of the Services Hospital.

== Early life and career ==
Mahmood Ayyaz graduated from Allama Iqbal Medical College in 1985. Then he completed his fellowship in surgery from College of Physicians and Surgeons of Pakistan in 1990. He was appointed as a professor in 2005 and later became Chairman, department of surgery at Services Institute of Medical Sciences, Lahore.

He has published more than 100 research publications in national and international journals. His main interest is in the field of medical education in Pakistan. He has served as Director General Punjab Human Organ Transplantation Authority, Lahore from 26 May 2022 to 21 July 2022. He has served as Dean Post Graduate Medical Education and Professional Development National Hospital Medical Centre Lahore from 17 October 2020 to 25 May 2022. He has also served as principal at Services Institute of Medical Sciences / Services Hospital, Lahore from August 2017 to 16 October 2020. He is also the Director General National Residency Program, College of Physicians and Surgeons Pakistan since 2015. He was the Vice President CPSP For the Year 2020.

== Awards and recognition ==
- Awarded Pakistan Civil Award Sitara-e-Imtiaz by President of Islamic Republic Pakistan in recognition of his valuable services in the field of education.
- He was awarded an honorary fellowship by the American College of Surgeons in November 2013.
