= Javed Akram (physician) =

Academic and civil servant of Pakistan

Professor of Medicine

Former Caretaker Minister of Health of the Government of Punjab

Former Vice Chancellor, University of Health Sciences Lahore, Government of Punjab

Former Vice Chancellor, Shaheed Zulfiqar Ali Bhutto Medical University Islamabad

Personal details
- Born: 3 March 1954 (age 72) Lahore
- Children: 4
- Education: University of Health Sciences, Lahore; Royal College of Physicians
- Profession: Professor of Medicine
- Awards: Best Research Award 2005 - 2006, Prime Minister’s Gold Medal in the field of Parkinson’s Disease in 1999 * Tamgha-e-Imtiaz (Pride of Performance) on 23rd March 2012, National Award for contribution in the field of medical education awarded by the Government of Pakistan on April 7, 2012,* Gold Medal on International Men’s Day by the Medical Women’s Association to honor the legend on 19-11-2024, The University College of Medicine & Dentistry, University of Lahore, presented the M.A. Raoof Lifetime Achievement Award in HPE & Healthcare to Prof. Javed Akram on November 5, 2024,* Highest award of recognition by the President of the Ceylon College of Physicians, Professor Upul Disanayake, in Colombo in September 2024 on the eve of 57th Annual Conference of the Ceylon College of Physicians in Colombo,* Appreciation Award from President of Pakistan for services in Diabetes Care in Pakistan on 15-11-2022
- Website: http://javedakram.com/

Javed Akram (Urdu: جاوید اکرم ) is a Pakistani academic who is a former caretaker Minister of Health of the Government of Punjab, Pakistan, former vice-chancellor of the University of Health Sciences, Lahore and the Shaheed Zulfiqar Ali Bhutto Medical University, Islamabad and former principal of Allama Iqbal Medical College, Lahore. Akram is an eminent professor of medicine and well known as a global medical researcher.

He trained in UK and US and served as dean of medicine at King Edward Medical College, Principal Allama Iqbal Medical College, CEO Jinnah Hospital, Lahore, founding vice chancellor Shaheed Zulfiqar Ali Bhutto Medical University, CEO Pakistan Institute of Medical Sciences and remained vice chancellor of the University of Health Sciences, Lahore from 2018 to 2022, founding president of Pakistan Society of Internal Medicine and international advisor to Royal College of Physicians London and is the recipient of the global excellence in patient care award from the same institution due to his recent research during the COVID-19 pandemic. He was conferred with the prestigious fellowship from the Ceylon College of Physicians (CCP) in Sri Lanka.

He is currently the chairman of Akram Medical Complex in Lahore, Pakistan.
