= Javed Akram =

Javed Akram may refer to:

- Javed Akram (army officer) (born 1948), Pakistani army officer and politician
- Javed Akram (physician) (born 1954), Pakistani physician, academic and caretaker minister of health of the Punjab
