= Farid Ahmad Khan =

Pakistani physician

- Born: 12 February 1963 (age 63); Lahore, Pakistan
- Education: MBBS, Punjab FCPS, Punjab FRCS, Edinburgh
- Alma mater: Government Central Model High school, Lahore Government College University, Lahore King Edward Medical University (KEMU), Lahore College of Physicians and Surgeons, Punjab Royal College of Surgeons of Edinburgh
- Occupations: Plastic Surgeon, Doctor

Farid Ahmad Khan (born 12 February 1963) is a Pakistani physician and plastic surgeon. He served as chairman, dean and principal at Sheikh Zayed Medical Institute Lahore from 2015 to 2018. He is a former Head of Plastic Surgery department at Services Institute of Medical Sciences, Lahore. He is currently a Member Higher Educucation Commission (HEC) of Pakistan. He is also a former registrar at King Edward Medical University. Khan is the founding president of the Pakistan Burn Association, from 2016 to 2018. He established the largest burn center in Punjab for poor patients in Mayo Hospital Lahore. He is also the first Pakistani surgeon to start Microvascular free flap Surgery, at Mayo hospital in 2000. During his tenure as Chairman of Shaikh Zayed hospital, Shaikh Zayed Hospital was the only public sector hospital in the province which had successfully completed more than 100 liver transplants and more than 800 kidney transplants.

== Early life and education ==
Khan was born in 1963 at Lahore. His father, Dr. Rasheed Ahmad Khan served in the Pakistan army. Khan completed his matriculation from Government Central Model high School in 1978. He received the Quaid-e-Azam Gold medal for standing first in Lahore board. He also obtained first position across all Boards of Pakistan and broke all records, obtaining an unprecedented 802/850 marks in his Secondary School Certificate. In 1983 he received another gold medal for being the Centenary best student (from 1883 to 1983) at Central Model High School.

Khan completed his MBBS from King Edward Medical University in 1987. He received distinctions in his first, second, third and final professionals.

Farid Ahmad Khan received a total of 6 gold medals and numerous distinctions during his undergraduate years.

Khan completed his FCPS in plastic surgery from the College of Physicians and Surgeons, Pakistan in 1998. He then completed his FRCS from the Royal College of Surgeons, Edinburgh in 1999.

== Career ==
Khan's first appointment was as a House Officer at Mayo Hospital, Lahore in 1987. Khan moved to the UK in 1995 and served as a Senior House Officer at The Queen Victoria Hospital of Plastic Surgery, East Grinstead. From 1996 to 2000, Khan worked as Regsitrar Plastic Surgery at Leicester Hospital, Stevenage and St. John's hospital, Edinburgh.

Khan returned to Pakistan in 2000 and worked as an Associate and assistant professor of Plastic Surgery at KEMU and Mayo Hospital until 2008. He then became a Professor and Dean of the Plastic Surgery department at both KEMU and Mayo Hospital until 2015.

Khan also served as the Registrar of King Edward Medical University in 2011.

Khan worked as Professor and head of department at the Federal Postgraduate Medical Institute and Shaikh Zayed Hospital, Lahore from 2015 and 2018. During this time period, he served as the Chairman of Shaikh Zayed Medical Complex. He was also appointed as the Principal and Dean of Shaikh Khalifa Bin Zayed Al-Nahyan Medical and Dental College from 2015 to 2018. In 2022, he worked as the principal of Services Institute of Medical Sciences.

Khan retired as a professor and Head of Plastic Surgery department at Services Institute of Medical Sciences, Lahore in 2023.

In August 2023, Khan was appointed as a Member of the Higher Education commission (HEC) by the Government of Pakistan.
