= Asad Muazzam =

Pakistani Politician

Member of the Provincial Assembly of Punjab
- In office 9th April 2008 – 29 May 2013
- Constituency: PP-67 (Faisalabad-XVI)
- In office 25 November 2002 – 3 November 2007
- Constituency: PP-67 (Faisalabad-XVI)

Personal details
- Party: Pakistan Tehreek-e-Insaf (2023-2024)
- Other political affiliations: Pakistan Peoples Party (1970-2023)

Asad Muazzam is a Pakistani politician who had been a Member of the Provincial Assembly of Punjab from 2002 to 2013.

== Biography ==
Muazzam was born on 2 July 1966 in Lahore. He did MBBS in 1992 from Allama Iqbal Medical College.

He was elected to the Provincial Assembly of Punjab as a candidate of Pakistan People's Party (PPP) from Constituency PP-67 (Faisalabad-XVII) in the 2002 Pakistani general election.

He was re-elected to the Provincial Assembly of Punjab as a candidate of PPP from Constituency PP-67 (Faisalabad-XVII) in the 2008 Pakistani general election.

He ran for the seat of the Provincial Assembly of Punjab from Constituency PP-115 (Faisalabad-XIX) in the 2018 Pakistani general election but was unsuccessful.
