= Nishtar Dental College =

Dental college in Multan, Pakistan

Nishtar Institute of Dentistry
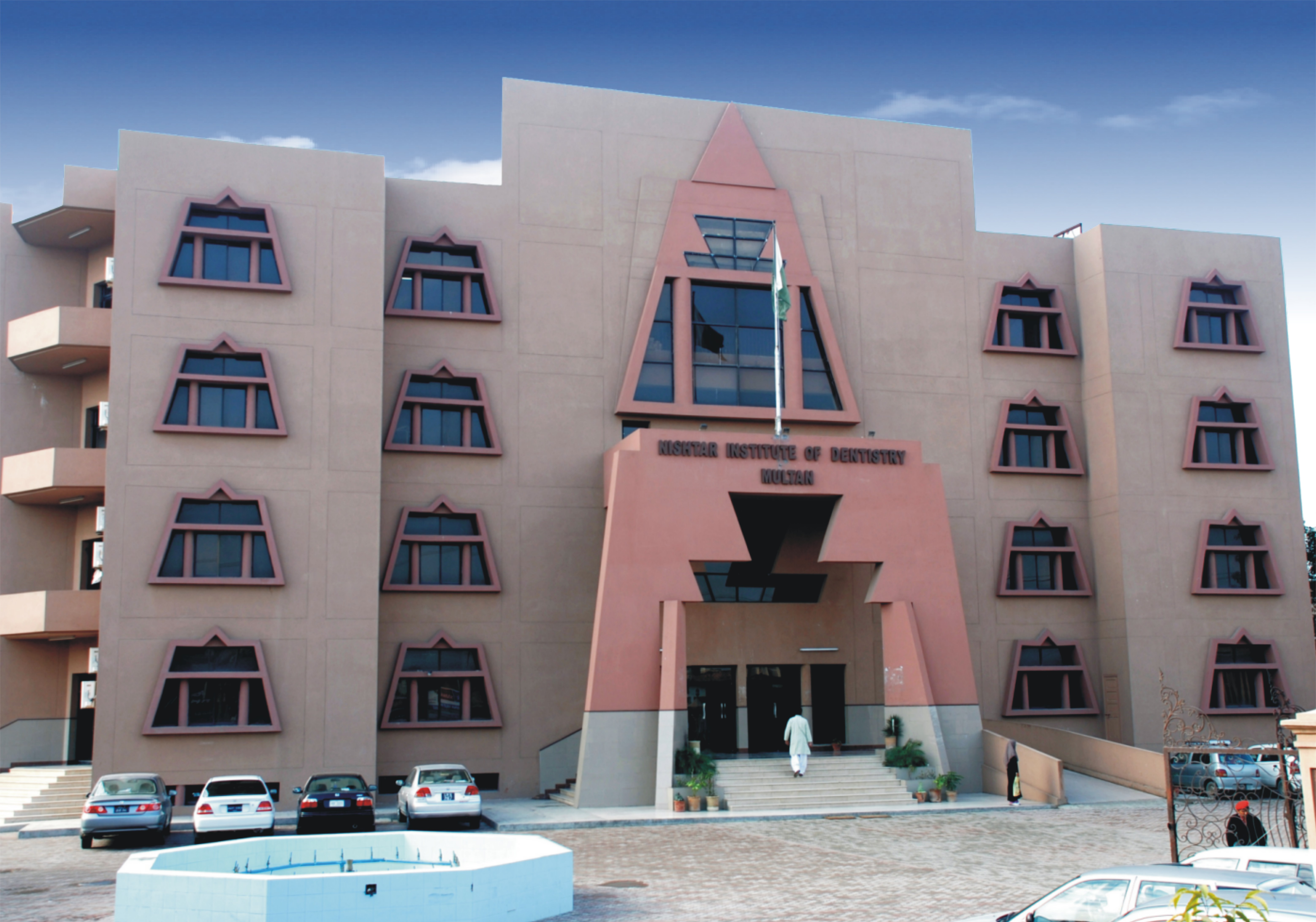
- Motto: Learn to Serve
- Type: Public
- Established: 1974, Dental Section, Nishtar Medical College
- Academic affiliations: Nishtar Medical University Pakistan Medical & Dental Council
- Principal: Zubair Hassan Awaisi
- Faculty: 72
- Administrative staff: 150
- Undergraduates: 235
- Postgraduates: 70
- Location: Multan, Pakistan; 30°12′25″N 71°26′35″E

Nishtar Institute of Dentistry is a dental school and a tertiary care dental and Oral-Maxillofacial trauma/diseases treatment facility located in Multan, Punjab, Pakistan.

== History ==
The Institution was initially established as Dental Section of Nishtar Medical College in year 1974. This new purpose served campus was built in April 2009 and the Dental Section, NMC, Multan was upgraded as autonomous Institution with new name “Nishtar Institute of Dentistry Multan”. Dr. M Khalid Gillani, who studied at University College London and worked to develop oral health care systems in Malaysia, worked as a professor for Nishtar Dental College.

== Programs offered ==

Departments of NID

- Bachelor of dental surgery (BDS)
- Programs in affiliation with College of Physicians and Surgeons Pakistan.
- Fellowship in Oral and Maxillofacial Surgery (FCPS)
- Fellowship in Prosthodontics (FCPS)
- Fellowship in Operative Dentistry (FCPS)
- Membership of Operative Dentistry (MCPS)
- Fellowship in Orthodontics(FCPS)
- Membership of Oral Surgery (MCPS)

== Recognition ==
The college is recognized for undergraduate and post-graduate training by the Pakistan Medical and Dental Council (PMDC) and College of Physicians and Surgeons of Pakistan and Pakistan Medical Commission. Currently, Prof. Muhammad Usman Akhtar, OMFS of Punjab and convener of Board of Studies-dentistry in University of Health Sciences, Lahore for NID, is the principal of dental sciences. Riaz Warraich is a prominent maxillo-facial surgeon, whereas previous head is Muhammad Saeed (dentist)

== Departments ==
Nishtar Institute of Dentistry has the following departments:

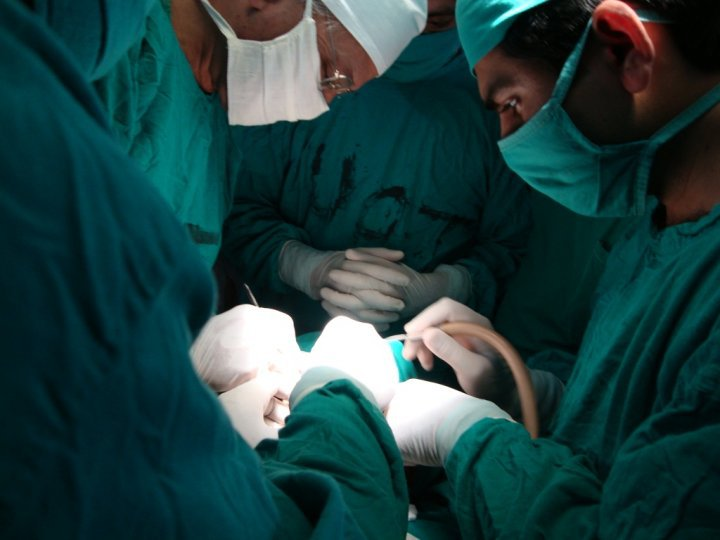
Doctors in operation theater

Basic Health Sciences departments in affiliation with the Nishtar Medical College
Anatomy
Behavioral Science
Biochemistry
Pathology
Pharmacology
Physiology

Dental Sciences departments
Orthodontics
Prosthetics
Oral and Maxillofacial Surgery
Diagnostics
Radiology
Pediatric dentistry
Operative Dentistry
Community Dentistry
Endodontics

Operation room
11 bed ward dedicated for Oral and Maxillofacial Surgery patients

In addition allied specialty exposure is done in then Oral and Maxillofacial Surgery and Department of Conservative Dentistry.

Attached teaching hospitals

Nishtar Hospital, Multan
