= Nazir Ahmad (neurosurgeon) =

Pakistani neurosurgeon (born 1950)

- Born: 1 January 1950 (age 76)
- Education: King Edward Medical University, University of the Punjab, Lahore
- Scientific career
- Fields: Neurosurgery
- Website: Official website

Nazir Ahmad (born 1 January 1950; Urdu: نذیر احمد) is a neurosurgeon from Pakistan. He has contributed to modernizing neurosurgical practices in the country and has published over 60 research articles in the field.

He had a role in establishing the Punjab Institute of Neurosciences), a neurosurgical facility in Pakistan.

Ahmad has introduced advanced surgical treatments for conditions such as cerebral arteriovenous malformations and aneurysms. He specializes in stereotactic surgery for movement disorders.

His research includes comparative studies on the effectiveness of plate and screw systems versus cage devices in correcting spinal instability. He developed techniques for neurosurgical procedures involving microscopes, flexible tubes with cameras, minimally invasive spinal surgery, and endovascular surgery for the brain and spinal cord.

Ahmad served as the Vice President of the Asian Congress of Neurological Surgeons (ACNS) and as the Chief Editor of the Pakistan Journal of Neurological Surgery (PJNS).
