= Anwer Zahidi =

Anwer Zahidi (Urdu: انور زاہدی)(born July 9, 1946) is a Pakistani physician, Urdu poet and author. He has published around a dozen books of poetry, short stories, travelogue and translations. After completing his graduation in science from Punjab University, Anwer Zahidi received a degree of MBBS from Nishtar Medical College, Multan in 1970.

== Career ==
A practicing physician by profession, Anwer Zahidi has carved out a place for himself in the world of letters. He is a short story writer, a poet and translator. His collection of verse Sunaehre Dinon Ki Shairi (Poetry of the Golden Days—1985) was followed by a collection of short stories titled Azab-e Shaher Panah (The Torture of the Ramparts—1991). New collection of poems Meri Aankhen Samadar and short stories Mausam Jang Ka Kahani Muhabbat Ki are under publication.

Dr. Zahidi is a literary critic as well as a creative writer. He recently completed a collection of critical writings on the world's great literary figures, called Bazyaft. Zahidi is also a Persian translator, his knowledge of the language coming from a three-year stay in Iran. He translated Hermann Hesse in Barishon Ka Mausam (The Rainy Season) and Carl Jung's Psychology of the Unconscious for the National Language Authority. Besides these books, he has also translated Arabic, Turkish, and Latin American literature. One of his contributions in the field of translation is Pablo Neruda's autobiography.

Mumtaz Mufti, one of the leading literary figures in Pakistan, entitled his review of Anwer Zahidi's literary work, "Part-time poet" - implying that this work was somehow secondary to his principle vocation of a physician at a leading hospital in Islamabad. In fact, "Full-time poet and part-time doctor" would have been more accurate. Since graduation from Nishtar Medical College, Multan (University of Punjab) in 1970, he has practiced medicine, first in the military (1971–73), then as a private practitioner (1973–76), and subsequently in public hospitals in two countries, Iran (1976–80) and Pakistan (1980 to date). Yet, ever since 1968, when one of his poems got published in a reputed Urdu magazine, Nairang-e-Khyal, literature has been his primary occupation.

Exposure to great Western literature - in English translations – led him to an interest in translating favorite pieces from English into Urdu. Over time, Anwer zahidi has translated some of the greatest writers of various languages into Urdu. These include Tolstoy, Hesse, Neruda, Dickens, and Pessoa. From Western literature he moved gradually towards other great writers including the Kirghiz epic poet, Manas, and most importantly modern Persian poets like Neema Yosheej, Ahmad Shamlo, and Frogh Furrukhzad. Translating Iranian poetry (directly from Persian) into Urdu was enormously edifying. These writers are the pioneers of the new literary movement of Iran; they have broken the metric rigidity of the traditional Persian Ghazal and revolutionized its poetic vision, and have had a deep impact upon the literary movements in the sub-continent. The study of contemporary Persian literature completely revolutionized his poetic diction, including the infusion of elements of rebellion in early romantic formulas.

Although Anwer Zahidi is known in South Asia primarily as a "modern" poet (Nazam-e-Azad), some of his most intense work is in the genre of abstract short stories. They enable a mode of expression that is difficult to incorporate into the poetic structure. Reflecting the nature of injustice and absurdity in contemporary existence, these short stories tend to take an acrid view of life. Prose writing also led him into translations of prose and non-fiction, including memoirs (Neruda) essays (Hesse), psychology (Jung).

== Books in Urdu ==
=== Poetry ===
- Sunehrey Dinon Ki Shairy-----1984

=== Fiction ===
- Azab-e-Shehrpanah----1991
- Mosam Jang Ka Kahani Muhabat Ki----1996
- Mandir Wali Gali------2006
- Bioscope Din --------2013
- Anwer Zahidi ki kahanian

=== Translations ===
- Dreechon Mein Hawa( Translation of modern Persian poetry)-----1985
- Barishon Ka mosam ( Translation of Herman Hesse's poetical works)---1986
- Yadein (Translation of Pablo Neruda’ s memoirs—1996)
- Lashaoor Tak Rassai (Translation of Jung's Approaching the Unconscious)—1996
- Manas (Translation of Krighizstan Epic poetry) --- 1997
- Pessoa Ki Nazmein (Translation of Fernando Pessoa's poetry)---1997
- Bazyaft- (Translation of World's ten great poets) ----2002

=== Travelogue ===
- Duneya Kahein Jisay ( Travelogue of USA/Canada/ London & Dubai)---2005

=== Research on Anwer Zahidi ===
Professor Ajab(Shangla) Khan took his MPhil degree under the title "the literary contributions of Anwer Zahidi" from AIOU Islamabad In 2012.The thesis puts light on all his literary services and proves him a poet, prose writer, and translator.
