= Farrukh Javed =

Pakistani politician

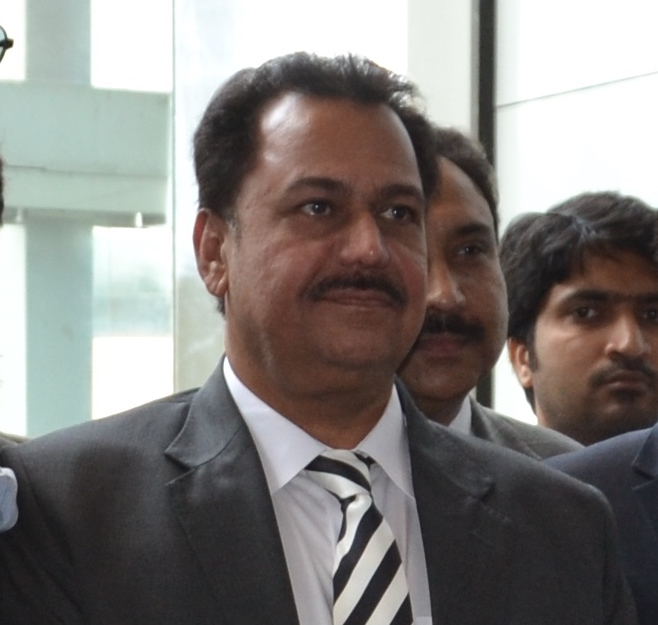

Member of the Provincial Assembly of the Punjab
- Incumbent
- Assumed office 2002

Personal details
- Born: 6 June 1958 (age 68) Arifwala, Punjab, Pakistan
- Party: PMLN (2002-present)

Punjab Assembly Lahore

Farrukh Javed (born 6 June 1958) is a Pakistani politician who was a Member of the Provincial Assembly of the Punjab, from 2002 to May 2018.

== Early life and education ==
He was born on 6 June 1958 in Arain family in Arifwala.

He has a degree of Bachelor of Medicine and Bachelor of Surgery which he obtained in 1985 from Nishtar Medical College.

== Political career ==
He was elected to the Provincial Assembly of the Punjab as a candidate of Pakistan Muslim League (Q) from Constituency PP-230 (Pakpattan-IV) in the 2002 Pakistani general election.

He was re-elected to the Provincial Assembly of the Punjab as a candidate of Pakistan Muslim League (N) (PML-N) from Constituency PP-230 (Pakpattan-IV) in the 2008 Pakistani general election.

He was re-elected to the Provincial Assembly of the Punjab as a candidate of PML-N from Constituency PP-230 (Pakpattan-IV) in the 2013 Pakistani general election. In June 2013, he was inducted into the provincial cabinet of Chief Minister Shahbaz Sharif and was made Provincial Minister of Punjab for Agriculture. He remained Minister for Agriculture until the cabinet reshuffle in November 2016, when he was made Provincial Minister of Punjab for literacy and non-formal education.
