= Allama Iqbal Medical College =

Medical college in Lahore, Pakistan

- علامہ اقبال میڈیکل کالج
- Official seal of AIMC
- Former name: Lahore Medical College (1975–1977)
- Motto: Dignity in Service
- Type: Public medical school
- Established: 2 May 1975; 51 years ago
- Accreditation: Pakistan Medical and Dental Council
- Academic affiliations: University of Health Sciences, Lahore (formerly University of the Punjab)
- Principal: Tayyiba Wasim
- Location: Allama Shabbir Ahmed Usmani Road (Canal Road), Lahore, Punjab, Pakistan; 31.4836°N 74.2964°E
- Campus: Urban, 105 acres (42 ha)
- Language: English
Colours
- Website: aimc.edu.pk

Allama Iqbal Medical College (AIMC) is a public medical college in Lahore, Punjab, Pakistan, and one of the most competitive for admission in the province; in 2023 it had the second-highest closing merit among Punjab's public medical colleges. It was established on 2 May 1975 as Lahore Medical College and was renamed two years later to mark the birth centenary of the poet-philosopher Muhammad Iqbal. The college is affiliated with the University of Health Sciences, Lahore, and Jinnah Hospital, located adjacent to the college complex, serves as its attached teaching hospital. In addition to the MBBS programme, it offers nursing, allied health and postgraduate programmes.

== History ==
The institution was established on 2 May 1975 as Lahore Medical College as part of a government initiative in the mid-1970s to expand medical education; Akhtar Hussain Awan was its first principal. Its first batch of 313 students began classes on 12 August 1975. In 1977 the college was renamed Allama Iqbal Medical College to commemorate the centenary of Muhammad Iqbal.

The college initially operated from temporary premises at the Postgraduate Medical Institute, Lahore. The plan for a dedicated campus was approved in 1980, and its foundation stone was laid in March of that year; the project had a budget of Rs 670 million. President Ghulam Ishaq Khan inaugurated the college complex on 18 May 1989. Services Hospital was the college's original teaching hospital; after the college moved to its present campus in 1990, Jinnah Hospital was built as a dedicated teaching hospital and began functioning in 1994.

The college's degree-awarding affiliation passed from the University of the Punjab to the University of Health Sciences, Lahore. The college held its 24th convocation on 8 May 2026.

== Campus ==
The campus lies on Allama Shabbir Ahmed Usmani Road along the Lahore Canal and covers about 105 acres (42 ha). It contains the basic science departments, an administrative block, a library, a lecture theatre complex and a cafeteria, along with sports facilities including an oval ground, a swimming pool, tennis and squash courts and separate gymnasiums for male and female students. According to the University of Health Sciences, the college has two hostels for female students and four for male students.

=== Library ===
The library has a main reading hall and an internet facility. According to the Pakistan Scientific and Technological Information Centre, it held about 28,000 books and subscribed to 14 international and 20 national medical journals.

== Teaching hospitals ==
Jinnah Hospital, Lahore, located adjacent to the college, is its attached teaching hospital. In May 2026 the Punjab health minister said a provincial project to revamp the hospital, at an estimated cost of about Rs 2 billion, included a new emergency block, blood bank and intensive care unit, and that the Punjab Healthcare Commission had issued the hospital a regular licence.

The Jinnah Burn and Reconstructive Surgery Centre, a 78-bed provincial facility built at a cost of Rs 1,241.997 million, is associated with the college and provides burn care, reconstructive surgery and postgraduate training.

== Academics ==
=== Programmes ===
The University of Health Sciences lists AIMC among its public-sector affiliated institutions, offering the MBBS degree, a Doctor of Physical Therapy programme, a BSc (Hons) in Medical Laboratory Technology and a range of postgraduate MD, MS, MPhil and diploma programmes. The affiliated College of Nursing offers a four-year BSc Nursing programme. The nursing college was established in 2003 by upgrading the earlier School of Nursing.

=== Admissions ===
Admission to the MBBS programme is centralised: the University of Health Sciences acts as the admitting university for public-sector medical colleges in Punjab, conducting the Medical and Dental College Admission Test (MDCAT) and compiling merit lists on behalf of the provincial government. For the 2025–26 session the UHS prospectus allocated 325 MBBS seats to AIMC. (Note: The Pakistan Medical and Dental Council's list of public medical colleges gives a seat allocation of 250.) In 2023 Dawn reported that AIMC had the second-highest closing merit among Punjab's public medical colleges, after King Edward Medical University, at 92.9364 per cent.

=== Recognition and affiliations ===
The college is listed by the Pakistan Medical and Dental Council as a recognised public medical college. It is listed in the World Directory of Medical Schools, which records that its students and graduates (graduation years 1975 to the present) are eligible to apply for ECFMG certification. It is also a collaborating unit of the International Network for Cancer Treatment and Research.

== Administration ==
The college is a provincial government institution under the Specialized Healthcare and Medical Education Department of the Government of Punjab. In April 2025 the department appointed Tayyiba Wasim, a professor of obstetrics and gynaecology, as principal on an additional-charge basis. She was serving as principal at the college's 24th convocation in May 2026.

== Publications ==
The Journal of Allama Iqbal Medical College (JAIMC) is the college's peer-reviewed journal, published quarterly since 2003 (ISSN 2076-2860). The college's annual magazine is Shaheen.

== Student life ==
Students of the college organise AIMSCon (Allama Iqbal Medical College Students' Conference), an annual student research conference first held at the college in October 2025. The second edition took place on 31 October 2026 on the theme "Bridging Divides: Ethics, Equity, and Access in Global Medicine", and included student abstract presentations, pre-conference workshops run by college departments, and a Research Olympiad open to students of health-related programmes from other colleges.

== Alumni ==
Students and graduates of the college are known as "Iqbalians". Alumni associations include AIMCAANA in North America and AIMCAUK in the United Kingdom.

=== Notable alumni ===
- Mahmood Ayyaz, surgeon and vice-chancellor of King Edward Medical University (MBBS, AIMC, 1985)

=== Notable former principals ===
- Syed Sibtul Hasnain, who was AIMC principal and chief executive of Jinnah Hospital when first elected president of the Pakistan Medical and Dental Council, and who was re-elected unopposed to a second five-year term in December 2011

== Incidents and controversies ==
In 2011 the Pakistan Medical Association criticised a decision by the Jinnah Hospital board of management to pay additional monthly allowances to the AIMC principal and senior hospital officials out of hospital revenue. In May 2024 Dawn reported service disruptions at Jinnah Hospital linked to a revamp project, which the AIMC principal acknowledged had caused serious problems.

== See also ==
- Jinnah Hospital
- Services Institute of Medical Sciences, Lahore
- List of medical schools in Pakistan
