= Nishtar Medical University =

University in Punjab, Pakistan

Coordinates: 30.2033°N 71.4412°E

- جامع طبی نیشتر
- Motto: Service & Discipline
- Type: Public
- Established: 29 April 1951
- Affiliations: Pakistan Medical & Dental Council; College of Physicians and Surgeons of Pakistan
- Vice-Chancellor: Mehnaz Khakwani
- Principal: Rashad Qamar Rao
- Location: 66000 Nishtar Road, Multan, Pakistan
- Campus: Urban 45 ha (112 acres)
- Mascot: Nishtarians
- Website: Official website

Nishtar Medical University; formerly Nishtar Medical College) is a public medical university located in Multan, Punjab, Pakistan. It is one of the oldest medical institutions established after the creation of Pakistan. It offers degree programs in medicine, dentistry, allied health sciences and nursing. It is named after Sardar Abdur Rub Nishtar, Pakistan movement leader, and then Governor of Punjab, Pakistan.

== History ==
Jamal Bhutta was the principal and medical superintendent of the institute. He belongs to the Bhutta family of Sialkot.

== Constituent colleges & programs offered ==
1. Nishtar Medical College

Undergraduate program;

- Bachelor of Medicine and Bachelor of Surgery (MBBS): a 5-year degree program
- With the Collaboration of Nishtar Medical University and Muhammad Nawaz Sharif University of Agriculture, Multan a combined BS Undergraduate degree program of Human Nutrition and Dietetics (HND) was started since 2019 under the umbrella of HEC.

Postgraduate programs;

Medical residency and fellowship training in different specialities of medicine and surgery in affiliation with College of Physicians and Surgeons of Pakistan.

2. Nishtar Institute of Dentistry
Undergraduate program;

Bachelor of Dental Surgery (BDS): a 4-year program.

Postgraduate programs;

Residency and fellowship training in different specialities of dentistry in affiliation with College of Physicians and Surgeons of Pakistan.

3. Nishtar College of Nursing

Bachelor of Science in Nursing (BSN): a 4-year nursing degree program.

== Affiliation ==
- The college was initially affiliated with University of the Punjab Lahore, the only university in Punjab at that time.
- In 1975 it became affiliated with Bahauddin Zakariya University, a newly formed university for South Punjab.
- In January 2003 it became affiliated with the University of Health Sciences, Lahore.
- In September 2017, the college was upgraded to university status after the passage of the Nishtar Medical University Act by the Provincial Assembly of Punjab.
- On 19 November 2020 Pakistan Medical Commission (PMC) permitted Nishtar Medical University (NMU) to conduct MBBS and BDS examinations for undergraduates and MD/MS examinations for post-graduates.

== Campus ==
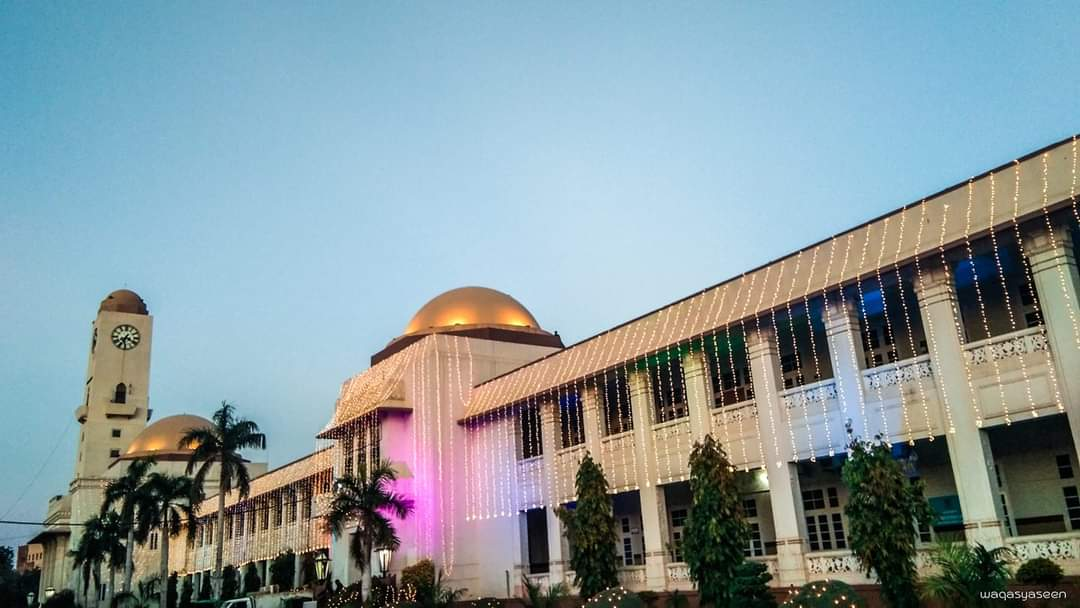
Main entrance of Nishtar Medical University Multan

The university is located at a distance of 3 km from the city centre. The campus is spread over 8.1 hectares (20 acres) of land. Nishtar Hospital, one of the largest hospitals in Pakistan, is located adjacent to the college. The total area of the campus, hospital and hostel area is more than 45 hectares (112 acres).

The city of Multan is one of the oldest localities in Pakistan; this is reflected in the architecture of the college and hospital – high ceilings and large windows are commonplaces.

The college itself is spacious, with the various academic departments housed around a central quadrangle. The quadrangle is a large garden used for student functions and gatherings. There is an attached hospital, adjacent hostels, and a faculty residential colony. The college as well as the hostels are nostalgic for old Islamic architecture. The buildings added to the campus in the 1960s to early 1980s were designed by A. R. Hye.

== Admissions ==
Medical & Dental College

Admission to all public medical & dental colleges is through a centralized system at the provincial level. Students are eligible to apply for MBBS or BDS programs after Higher Secondary School Certificate (HSSC) or equivalent examination. Candidates are selected by a rigorous admission process that includes a competitive Medical & Dental College Admission Test (MDCAT) conducted annually under the instruction of Pakistan Medical Commission. Merit is determined by the marks obtained on the MDCAT & Higher Secondary School Certificate (HSSC) or equivalent examination.

Foreign/International students can apply for admission through the Higher Education Commission of Pakistan.

College of Nursing

Students can apply for 4 year BSN program after HSSC or equivalent examination. There is no central admission policy for nursing colleges. Students apply directly to the College of Nursing for admission consideration. Students accepted to the BSN program are offered a monthly stipend equivalent to BS-17.

== Student life ==
Students come from the province of Punjab and other parts of Pakistan, as well as from several other countries, including Jordan, Palestine, Nepal, Sri Lanka, Bangladesh India and other African and Asian countries. Most choose to live in the hostels on the campus.

== Recognition ==
The university is recognized for undergraduate and postgraduate medical training by the Pakistan Medical Commission and the College of Physicians and Surgeons of Pakistan.

Nishtar Medical University is also on the list of recognised universities of Higher Education Commission of Pakistan.

It is listed in the FAIMER International Medical Education Directory of International Medical Schools. Nishtar's graduates are eligible to appear in different countries medical licensing exams including United States Medical Licensing Examination (USMLE) and Professional and Linguistic Assessments Board test (PLAB) of UK.

== Departments ==
Nishtar Medical University has the following departments:

Basic Health Sciences departments
Anatomy
Physiology
Biochemistry
Behavioral Medicine
Forensic Medicine
Pathology
Pharmacology
Community Medicine
Medical Education
Human Nutrition and Dietetics

Clinical Health Sciences departments
Medicine
Surgery
Pediatrics
Obstetrics & Gynecology
Ophthalmology
Otorhinolaryngology

In addition, allied speciality exposure is ensured in different sub-specialties of medicine and surgery.

Teaching hospitals
Nishtar Hospital, Multan
Nishtar Institute of Dentistry, Multan

== Alumni ==
Nishtar Medical College graduates have a strong alumni presence in the United States. Nishtar Medical College Alumni Association Of North America (NANA) continues to fund one major project every year. Some of the continuing and past projects include 25 scholarships per year, an extension project of the paediatrics ward, a conference room in the ER, a GI/Endoscopy suite, the establishment of a cardiac catheterization lab, and an IT and Simulation Lab for the students.

== Notable alumni ==
- Rizvie Salih, Sri Lankan politician who is currently serving as the Deputy Speaker of the Parliament of Sri Lanka
- Lal Khan, Pakistani Marxist
- Anwer Zahidi, Pakistani physician, Urdu poet and author
- Sher Afgan Niazi, Pakistani politician
- Ghulam Akbar Khan Niazi, Pakistani physician
- Salah ud Din Khan, Pakistani politician
- Muhammad Afzal, Pakistani politician
- Farrukh Javed, Pakistani politician
- Sikandar Sultan Raja, Pakistani civil servant
- Faisal Masud, Pakistani endocrinologist
