= Riaz Haider =

American physician (1934–2023)

Riaz Haider MD, FACP, FACC, FRCP
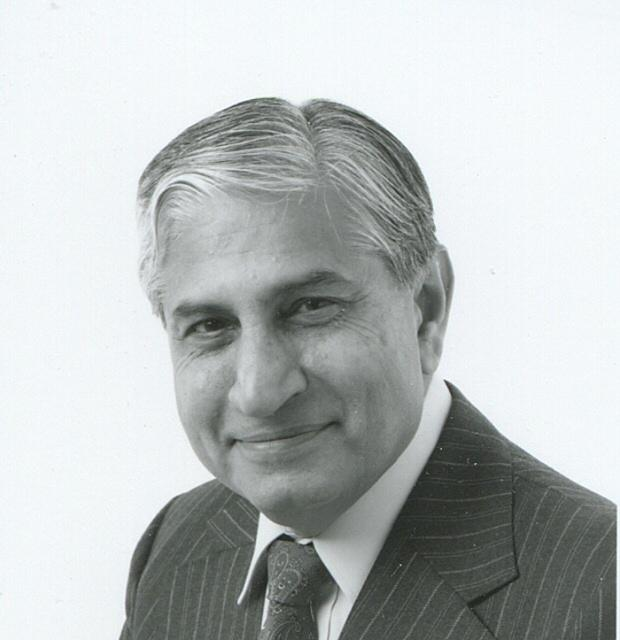
- Born: 2 July 1934; Sheikhupura, British India
- Died: 8 June 2023 (aged 88); Washington D.C., U.S.
- Education: King Edward Medical University, Lahore
- Years active: 1956–2011
- Medical career
- Profession: Physician
- Field: Cardiology
- Institutions: Hammersmith Hospital, Imperial College, London; Fatimah Jinnah Medical College; University of Maryland Hospital, Baltimore; The Providence Hospital, Washington, D.C.; George Washington University, Washington, D.C.; American Heart Association
- Research: Adult and pediatric cardiology

Riaz Haider (2 July 1934 – 8 June 2023) was a Pakistani-born American physician, cardiologist, author, and medical educator. He worked in the areas of diagnostic cardiac ultrasound, heart pacemakers, exercise stress testing, and heart catheterization. He was the president of the American Heart Association Nation's Capital Affiliate, and served as a Clinical Professor of Medicine at the George Washington University School of Medicine & Health Sciences, from 1984 to 2011. He was an elected Fellow of the American College of Physicians, the American College of Cardiology, and the Royal College of Physicians. He retired in 2011, and later resided in Potomac, Maryland.

== Early life and education ==
Haider was born in Sheikhupura, British India (now Pakistan) on 2 July 1934. His father was a civil servant. He attended high school at the Government Central Model School in Lahore, Pakistan. He left Pakistan for the U.K. in 1957, and moved to the United States in 1966.

Haider attended the Government College University, Lahore, and then King Edward Medical University, where he qualified as a doctor in 1956 at the age of 22. He received training and conducted research in internal medicine and adult and pediatric cardiology in both the U.S. and the U.K.

== Career ==
Haider spent much of his career in the Washington, D.C. area and taught at University of Maryland Medical Center, Providence Hospital (Washington, D.C.), and George Washington University School of Medicine & Health Sciences.

He was chief of cardiology at the Providence Hospital (Washington, D.C.) from 1974 to 1993, and president of Washington Cardiology Associates, P.C. from 1974 to 2008. Over the span of nearly 5 decades, he held appointments at the London Chest Hospital, Fatima Jinnah Medical University, University of Maryland, University of Birmingham, and Hammersmith Hospital in London.

At Hammersmith Hospital he directed the adult cardiac catheterization laboratories. The role included training cardiology fellows and researching diverse areas of heart disease. At GWU Hospital, with Joseph Lindsay, Haider introduced Swan-Ganz cardiac catheterization in evaluation of cardiac function after acute myocardial infarction. At Providence Hospital he initiated new cardiovascular laboratories.

Haider was director emeritus and a board member of the International Student House of Washington, D.C., which provides residential experience to a group of American and international graduate students, interns, and visiting scholars.

He published articles in The American Journal of Cardiology, the British Heart Journal, and Proceedings of the Society for Experimental Biology and Medicine. He released his first book, A Triumphant Voyage, Great Achievements in Cardiology in April 2020.

== Death ==
Haider died in Washington, D.C., on 8 June 2023, at the age of 88.

== Awards and honours ==
- Smith, Kline & French Fellowship Award in Internal Medicine, 1966
- American Heart Association, Nation's Capital, Grant in Aid Research Award, 1973
- American College of Cardiology, Member of the Order of William Harvey, 1977
- Heart House Founder, American College of Cardiology 1977
- Gold Headed Cane Award, Providence Hospital (Washington, D.C.), 1992
- American Heart Association, Nation's Capital, Heart of Gold Award, 1992

== Publications ==
=== Books ===
- Haider, Riaz (2020-04-30). A Triumphant Voyage: Great Achievements in Cardiology. Riaz Haider. ISBN 978-0-578-66177-3.

=== Articles ===
- Haider, Riaz; Storey, Geoffrey (1962-06-02). "Spontaneous Fractures in Rheumatoid Arthritis". Br Med J. 1 (5291): 1514–1516. doi:10.1136/bmj.1.5291.1514. ISSN 0007-1447. PMID 13903699.
- Haider, Riaz; Singh, S. P. (1970). "Phentolamine In Heart Block". The British Medical Journal. 4 (5730): 307–307. ISSN 0007-1447.
- Haider, R Endotoxin Fever and Tolerance in Totally Adrenalectomized Rabbits. Proc. Soc. Exp. BioI. & Med. 136, 2, 514, 1971
- Faithfull, N. S.; Haider, R. (1971). "Ketamine for cardiac catheterisation". Anaesthesia. 26 (3): 318–323. doi:10.1111/j.1365-2044.1971.tb04792.x. ISSN 1365-2044.
- Haider, R, Finnegan, P., Sanchos, P., Singh, S.P., Abrams, L.D. & Parsons, D., Twelve year follow-up of Tetralogy of Fallot after surgical Correction of Fallots Tetralogy in Childhood. Brit. H.J. 34, 2,205, 1972
- Khan, A. H.; Boughner, D. R.; Haider, R. (1972-11). "Effect of phentolamine on atrioventricular conduction in man assessed by recording His bundle potential". British Heart Journal. 34 (11): 1102–1106. doi:10.1136/hrt.34.11.1102. ISSN 0007-0769. PMID 4635346.
- Gorman, P., Byers, R & Haider, R. Exercise Electrocardiography. In Exercise Testing and Exercise Training in Coronary Heart Disease (Naughton, J. and Hallerstein, H., Ed.). New York Academic Press, 93–102, 1973
- Haider, R., Thomas, D.G.T., Zaidy, G., Cleland, W.P. & Goodwin, J.F. Congenital pericardio-peritoneal Communication with Herniation of omentum into the Pericardium. Brit. Ht. J. 35, 981–984, 1973
- Naughton, J. & Haider, R. Methods of Exercising Testing. In Exercise Testing and Exercise Training in Coronary Heart Disease ( Naughton, J. and Hallerstein, H. Ed.), New York Academic Press, 71–91, 1973
- Singh, S. P.; Haider, R. (1973-01). "The lack of value of hepato-jugular reflux as a sign of heart failure". Postgraduate Medical Journal. 49 (567): 10–13. ISSN 0032-5473. PMC 2495370. PMID 4731436.
- Khan, A. H.; Haider, R.; Boughner, D. R.; Oakley, C. M.; Goodwin, J. F. (1973-07). "Sinus rhythm with absent P waves in advanced rheumatic heart disease". The American Journal of Cardiology. 32 (1): 93–97. doi:10.1016/s0002-9149(73)80091-8. ISSN 0002-9149. PMID 4713117
- Gorfinkel, J.H., Haider, R. & Lindsay, J. Diagnosis and Treatment of Hemodynamic Abnormalities after Acute Myocardial Infarction. Medical Annals of the District of Columbia Vol. 43, No.8, 399, 1974
- Finnegan, P.; Haider, R.; Patel, R. G.; Abrams, L. S.; Singh, S. P. (1976-09-01). "Results of total correction of the tetralogy of Fallot. Long-term haemodynamic evaluation at rest and during exercise". Heart. 38 (9): 934–942. doi:10.1136/hrt.38.9.934. ISSN 1355-6037. PMID 786344.
- Haider, R.; Meyer, J. F.; Rasul, A. M. (1984-05). "Cardiac pacemakers: current concepts". American Family Physician. 29 (5): 223–228. ISSN 0002-838X. PMID 6731240.
