= Muhammad Afzal (politician) =

Pakistani politician

Member of the Provincial Assembly of the Punjab
- In office 2002 – 31 May 2018

Personal details
- Born: 11 October 1964 (age 62) Bahawalpur, Punjab, Pakistan
- Party: PTI (2023-present)
- Other political affiliations: PML(Q) (2002-2023)

Punjab Assembly Lahore

Muhammad Afzal is a Pakistani politician who was a Member of the Provincial Assembly of the Punjab, from 2002 to May 2018.

== Early life and education ==
He was born on 11 October 1964 in Bahawalpur.

He has the degree of the Bachelor of Medicine and Bachelor of Surgery which he obtained in 1988 from Nishtar Medical College.

== Political career ==
He was elected to the Provincial Assembly of the Punjab as a candidate of Pakistan Peoples Party (PPP) from Constituency PP-276 (Bahawalpur-X) in the 2002 Pakistani general election. He received 35,989 votes and defeated a candidate of Pakistan Muslim League (Q) (PML-Q).

He was re-elected to the Provincial Assembly of the Punjab as a candidate of PML-Q from Constituency PP-276 (Bahawalpur-X) in the 2008 Pakistani general election. He received 30,645 votes and defeated a candidate of Pakistan Muslim League (N).

He was re-elected to the Provincial Assembly of the Punjab as a candidate of PML-Q from Constituency PP-276 (Bahawalpur-X) in the 2013 Pakistani general election.
