= Salah ud Din Khan =

Pakistani politician

Member of the Provincial Assembly of the Punjab
- In office 29 May 2013 – 31 May 2018

Personal details
- Born: 8 October 1963 (age 62) Mianwali, Punjab, Pakistan
- Party: PTI (2013-present)

Salah ud Din Khan is a Pakistani politician who was a Member of the Provincial Assembly of the Punjab, from May 2013 to May 2018. He is also the Amir of Bahawalpur and the Abbasi family

== Early life and education ==
He was born on 8 October 1963 in Mianwali.

He has a degree of Bachelor of Medicine and Bachelor of Surgery which he obtained in 1988 from Nishtar Medical College and has a degree of Master of Science in General Surgery where he received in 2002 from Quaid-i-Azam University.

== Political career ==
He was elected to the Provincial Assembly of the Punjab as a candidate of Pakistan Tehreek-e-Insaf from Constituency PP-44 (Mianwali-II) in the 2013 Pakistani general election.
