= Farrukh Siyar Hashmi =

Farrukh Siyar Hashmi OBE FRCPsych (September 12, 1927 – December 25, 2010) was a consultant psychiatrist who contributed to the development of transcultural psychiatry and race relations legislation in post-war Britain.

== Early life ==
Born in Gujrat, pre-partition India, now Pakistan, to Dr Ziaullah Qureshi & Majida Mufti, Hashmi was brought up in a religious Muslim household which placed great focus on learning and a heterogeneous education. Hashmi attended both a Muslim madrassa and a Brahmin Hindu school, where as a Muslim non-Brahmin he studied from outside the threshold of the building to avoid polluting it. He memorised both the Qur'an and tracts of the Hindu Vedas.

In his early twenties, Hashmi witnessed the horrors of Partition and its division of people along ethnic and religious lines – as a young medic, helping those injured, he saved a young Sikh woman from mob violence but fled from Amritsar University after being attacked, eventually resuming his medical studies in King Edward Medical College Lahore, Pakistan.

== Life in Britain ==
In 1953 he moved to the United Kingdom for postgraduate studies, experiencing and witnessing racism and struggles of ethnic minorities and immigrants in post-War Britain. Hashmi intended to work in a teaching hospital but was told by the British Medical Association that as an immigrant he would never be able to get such a job – persevering for three months, he found unpaid attachment at the teaching hospital in Hampstead, in which he proved himself and was offered a paid post as a junior doctor. Later, with the intention to support other doctors and help challenge the discriminatory attitudes of the medical profession, he founded the Overseas Doctor's Association in 1975.

Hashmi worked in London hospitals for some time, in both the Royal Free and King’s College groups, and then in Edinburgh, followed by a 5-year research post at the University of Birmingham in transcultural psychiatry in the British context: mental illness caused or influenced by cultural and/or religious factors, including the effects of migration and racism. It was this work in mental illness through which he became active in the field of race relations, informed by his personal experiences of the events leading to Partition and racial discrimination upon moving to the UK.

== Transcultural psychiatry and race relations ==
As a result of his research in Birmingham, Hashmi acted in an advisory capacity to the UK government for many years: he was made a member of the Race Relations Board in the Home Office (1976-1985) and for this work was appointed an OBE for services to race relations in 1974, contributing to the passing of the Race Relations Act by Parliament in 1976. He was a Commissioner at the Commission for Racial Equality 1980-1986, and a key advisor to the government during the 1981 and 1985 Handsworth riots, highlighting the impact of social divisions and inequality on the individual and community level. His view was that although it would be ideal if racism and discrimination disappeared through integration, education and awareness, sometimes legislation was necessary to encourage and expedite this process.

== Support of South Asian arts in Britain ==
Hashmi’s interest in scholarship and diversity reached beyond his professional life, and he was active in interfaith work in a voluntary capacity in Birmingham. He was active in his support for South Asian arts and their promotion in the British context, hosting poets including Faiz Ahmed Faiz and Ahmad Faraz, and as a trustee of Ravi Music College. Hashmi was a founder of the Iqbal Academy at Coventry Cathedral, and its chairman, 1972–1973.

== Latter years ==
After retirement Hashmi developed a medico-legal practice and worked as an expert witness, particularly with patients from ethnic minority backgrounds until retiring fully from clinical practice just short of his 80th birthday upon receiving his diagnosis of cancer. Hashmi died at his family home in Birmingham UK, on 25 December 2010.

== Positions held ==
- 1953 MB BS, King Edward Medical College, Lahore (Punjab University)
- 1953 (March–September) Mayo Hospital and King Edward Medical College, Lahore
- 1954 New End Hospital, Hampstead, London
- 1954-55 Children's Hospital, Birkenhead, Liverpool
- 1955-56 Brook General Hospital, Woolwich
- 1956 Snowdon Road Hospital, Bristol
- 1957 Assistant Medical Officer for Health, Berwickshire
- 1958-60 Scholar, Volkart Foundation, Switzerland
- 1960-63 Uffculme Clinic and All Saints Hospital, Birmingham
- 1963-66 Research Fellow, Department of Psychiatry, University of Birmingham
- 1966-81 Member, Health and Welfare Advisory Panel for National Commission on Commonwealth Immigrants
- 1968-81 Member, West Midlands Conciliation Committee of Race Relations Board
- 1969-1992 Consultant Psychiatrist, All Saints Hospital, Birmingham
- 1970-77 BBC Regional Advisory Committee
- 1972-86 Founder Chairman of the Iqbal Academy, Coventry Cathedral
- 1973-1981 Member, Home Office Advisory Committee on Race Relations Research
- 1973 Psychotherapist to HM Prison Stafford
- 1974-76 President, Pakistan Medical Society, UK
- 1975-79 Founder President of Overseas Doctors Association
- 1976-81 Member, Home Secretary's Advisory Committee on Race
- 1976-92 Mental Health Services Committee, Regional Health Committee
- 1977-81 Editorial Board, Medicos
- 1977-83, 1988-92 Chairman, Psychiatric Division West Birmingham Health District
- 1978-81 Member, World Federation for Mental Health
- 1979 Elected as Fellow of the Royal College of Psychiatrists
- 1979-84 Elected member of the General Medical Council
- 1980-86 Commissioner, Commission for Racial Equality
- 1981-85 Member, Home Office Parole Board
- 1982-83 Member Working Part of Communities and Race Relations Training
- 1982-83 Home Office Police Training Council
- 1982-85 Swann Committee of Inquiry into Education of Children from Ethnic Minority Groups
- 1982-90 Central District Health Authority
- 1982-92 Working Group on Ethnic Minorities, West Midlands Regional Health Authority
- 1983-84 Member General Medical Council Tribunal on the Misuse of Drugs
- 1984-87 Advisory Consultant, Church of England Board for Social Responsibility
- 1985 Alternate Member, Economic Social Committee, European Economic Community
- 1989 Woodbourne Clinic Hospital Management Team
- 1994 Consultant Psychiatrist in Eating Disorders, St Michaels Hospital, Warwick
- Approved by Law Society
- Member Academy Experts and UK Register of Expert Witnesses

== Published works ==
- 1966 "Mores Migration and Mental Illness" in Wolstenholme & O'Conner Immigration: Medical and Social Aspects: Ciba Foundation
- 1967 Pakistani Family in Britain. London: National Committee for Commonwealth Immigrants
- 1968 "Community Psychiatric Problems among Birmingham Immigrants," in British Journal of Social Psychiatry 2 (1968): 196 – 201.
- 1969 Psychology of Racial Prejudice, Community Relations Commission
- 1977 with Cochrane & Stopes-Roe "Measuring Psychological Disturbance in Asian Immigrants to Britain" in Social Science & Medicine (1967) Volume 11, Issue 3, February 1977, Pages 157–164

== Awards ==
1974 Awarded OBE for services to Race Relations
