= Punjab Healthcare Commission =

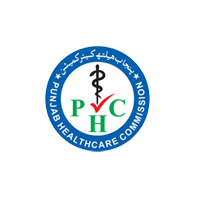

Geography
- Location: Office # 185, Ahmed Block, New Garden Town, Lahore, Pakistan, Punjab, Pakistan

History
- Founded: 2010

Links
- Website: https://www.phc.org.pk
- Lists: Hospitals in Pakistan

The Punjab Healthcare Commission (reporting name: PHC پی ایج سی) is an autonomous health regulatory body that regulate the hospitals, clinics, laboratories and other health centres in the province of Punjab, Pakistan. It was established by the Government of the Punjab under the Punjab Healthcare Commission Act 2010.

The PHC is responsible for developing and enforcing Minimum Service Delivery Standards (MSDS) at all levels of healthcare, to improve the quality of healthcare services and foster a culture of Clinical Governance. All Healthcare Establishments are required to implement MSDS to acquire a License to deliver healthcare services in Punjab.

== History ==
The progress towards achieving health goals for Punjab for its nearly 96 million people has remained uneven. Regulatory functions in the health sector have always been underdeveloped, poorly managed, and improperly implemented. In light of the increasing series of medical negligence, maladministration and malpractice cases in recent years, a need was felt for an autonomous authority at a provincial level to regulate healthcare services delivery in both Public and Private Healthcare Establishments.

The Punjab Government took notice of incidents of medical negligence and promulgated the PHC Act, 2010. The Punjab Healthcare Commission was set up to ensure quality healthcare service delivery at all levels and also to protect the well being of the patients.

== Vision ==
High Quality and safe Healthcare Service delivery for all.

== Mission ==
Continually raise standards of Healthcare Service delivery throughout Punjab.

== Resolve ==
Striving for Quality Healthcare in Punjab.

== Mandate ==
The PHC is mandated to regulate healthcare service delivery through the registration and licensing of HCEs, the development of Minimum Service Delivery Standards (MSDS) and the enforcement of these standards through inspections, the adjudication of complaints from both patients and healthcare service providers and deciding on cases involving illegal and unqualified practitioners.

== Core Functions ==
The Punjab Healthcare Commission aims to improve the quality, safety and efficiency of healthcare services and ban quackery in all its forms and manifestations.

=== Prescribing Standards ===
Practicing a distinct and internationally accepted approach, utilizing literature reviews and consultations with experts and stakeholders, the PHC has developed MSDS for a wide array of HCEs, ranging from multispecialty, tertiary care hospitals to previously unregulated disciplines of treatment, e.g. homeopathic clinics, matabs, etc.

=== Adjudicating Complaints ===
Designed to conform with high standards of fairness and equity, the PHC's responsive complaints management system ensures due diligence in investigating and deciding on cases of medical negligence, malpractice, administrative failure, harassment and damages to property. This includes a thorough consideration of all documentary evidence, cross-examination of parties and witnesses, field visits to inspect reported HCEs and expert opinion to warrant the course of treatment rendered.

=== Registration and Licensing ===
The PHC has formalized a process to license all legitimate HCEs demonstrating compliance with MSDS. Staff of HCEs registered and provisionally licensed with the Commission are trained on the MSDS and facilitated on their implementation through a pre-assessment, after which a formal inspection is conducted to assess MSDS compliance and thus, eligibility for the Regular License.

=== Banning Quackery ===
Operating under a pro-active Anti-Quackery Strategy, the PHC is running an organized, strategic and consolidated campaign against quackery. This involves mobilizing the general public and utilizing district administrations and its own enforcement team to undertake decisive, sustainable and synchronized action against quacks.

== Achievements ==
- First statutory body in the SAARC region to regulate healthcare service deliver
- Pioneered the development of standards for previously unregulated systems of treatment
- Introduced the concept of quality in healthcare service delivery
- Launched a strategic campaign against quackery
- Conducted a census of all HCEs in Punjab

== Governance Structure ==
The Board of Commissioners is constituted under the PHC Act, 2010 for the general superintendence, direction and management of the Punjab Healthcare Commission. The Board is responsible for providing strategic guidance and leadership to the Commission.

=== Chairperson ===
- Mr. Justice (Retd.) M. Bilal Khan (Chairperson)

=== Commissioners ===
- Professor Dr. Talat Afza
- Mr. Salman Siddique
- Professor Dr. Riaz Ahmad Tasneem
- Mr. Sami Ibrahim
- Dr. Muhammad Shafiq Pitafi
- Dr. Umar Farooq Khan
- Dr. Azim ud Din Zahid Lakhvi
- Mr. Hamesh Khan

== Media ==
- Cash and camel steroids: Inside the anti-quackery raids targeting Pakistan’s backstreet clinics | By Ben Farmer - Standardising the Clinics of General Practitioners - World Bank mission briefed on PHC working - PHCs performance in 2018
- Press Releases
- Publications

== Contact Information ==
Head Office

Address:185, Ahmed Block, New Garden Town, Lahore, Pakistan Regional Offices: Multan and Rawalpindi

Regional Offices

North: Rawalpindi Office

House No.16-A, 1st Floor, Civil Lines, Rawalpindi | 051- 9293035-6

South: Multan Office

House No. 7A, Street No. 1, Gulshan-e-Madina Colony, Suraj Miani Road, Near Razabad Chowk, Multan | 061- 9330150

Free Helpline

0800-00742
