= Javed Akram (army officer) =

Pakistani politician and former army officer

Javed Akram is a Pakistani retired military officer and politician who served as a member of the Provincial Assembly of Punjab from 2002 to 2007.

== Biography ==
Javed Akram born on December 4, 1948, to Chaudhry Muhammad Akram. He was commissioned into the Pakistan Army in 1970 and later graduated from the Pakistan Command and Staff College in Quetta in 1980. He took retirement from military service in 1998 as a brigadier. Later, he was awarded a Sitara-e-Imtiaz by the President of Pakistan for his service.

After retiring from the Pakistan Army, Javed served as the managing director at the Water and Sanitation Agency (WASA) from 1998 to 1999. He also served as Nazim of a Union Council from 2001 to 2002 and was a member of the Public Safety Commission in Toba Tek Singh.

In 2002, Javed was elected as an independent candidate to the Provincial Assembly of Punjab and served as the Parliamentary Secretary for Provincial Professional Management Development in 2004.

In December 2024, Javed received a six-year prison sentence from a military trial court for his alleged role in the attack on the Corps Commander House, Lahore.
