= Jinnah Hospital, Lahore =

Hospital in Lahore, Pakistan

Jinnah Hospital جناح ہسپتال

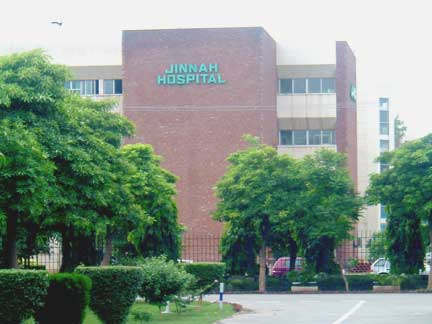
- A picture of the hospital

- Location in Lahore Jinnah Hospital, Lahore (Punjab, Pakistan) Jinnah Hospital, Lahore (Pakistan)

Geography
- Location: Lahore, Punjab, Pakistan
- Coordinates: 31°29′05″N 74°17′51″E

Organisation
- Care system: Public
- Type: Teaching hospital
- Affiliated university: Allama Iqbal Medical College

Services
- Beds: 1650

Helipads
- Helipad: Available

History
- Founded: 1996

Jinnah Hospital (Urdu: جناح ہسپتال) is the teaching hospital of Allama Iqbal Medical College, located in Lahore, Punjab, Pakistan. It is owned by the Government of Punjab. It is spread over 42 hectares (105 acres). According to the 'Ranking Web of World Hospitals', Jinnah Hospital, Lahore was the second best public sector hospital in Pakistan in 2016.

== Recognition ==
Jinnah Hospital, Lahore is accredited by the College of Physicians and Surgeons of Pakistan.

== History ==
It began operations in 1994, with very limited facilities, and was formally inaugurated on 2 February 1996, although with only basic specialties at first. In 2005, it added a new 100 bed Accident & Emergency Department.

The number of patients increased from 500,000 in 2003 to 700,000 in 2007. This increase reflects the faith of general public in this hospital. Jinnah Hospital, Lahore is also on the 'Tertiary Hospitals List' issued by the Government of Punjab, Pakistan.

=== Controversy over Renaming ===
In July 2025, the Punjab government of Pakistan faced backlash after an apparent attempt to rename the Jinnah Institute of Cardiology, Lahore after Chief Minister Maryam Nawaz. The move was widely criticized on social media as a politically motivated effort to erase national icons for personal glorification. Following public outrage, Punjab Senior Minister Marriyum Aurangzeb issued a clarification, stating that "no change is under consideration" and that the institution will retain its original name. Critics argue the episode reflects a recurring pattern in Pakistani politics—of prioritizing dynastic interests over public sentiment and historical legacy.

== Services ==
1. General Medicine
2. General Surgery
3. Neurosurgery
4. Paediatrics
5. Physiotherapy Department
6. Cardiology/ CCU
7. ENT
8. Ophthalmology/ Eye
9. Dermatology (Skin)
10. Obstetrics & Gynaecology
11. Cardiac Surgery
12. Pulmonology/ T.B. & Chest
13. Accident and Emergency Department
14. Labour Room
15. Trauma Centre
16. Orthopaedic Ward
17. Oncology
18. Psychiatry
19. Radiotherapy
20. Anaesthesia/ Intensive Care Unit (ICU)
21. Plastic Surgery
22. Urology
23. Burn Centre (State of art)
24. Paediatric Surgery
25. Private Rooms
26. Nephrology
27. Endocrinology
28. Fascio Maxillary Surgery
29. Vascular Surgery
30. Diabetic Centre
