= Nishtar Hospital =

Hospital in Multan, Pakistan

Nishtar Hospital, Multan
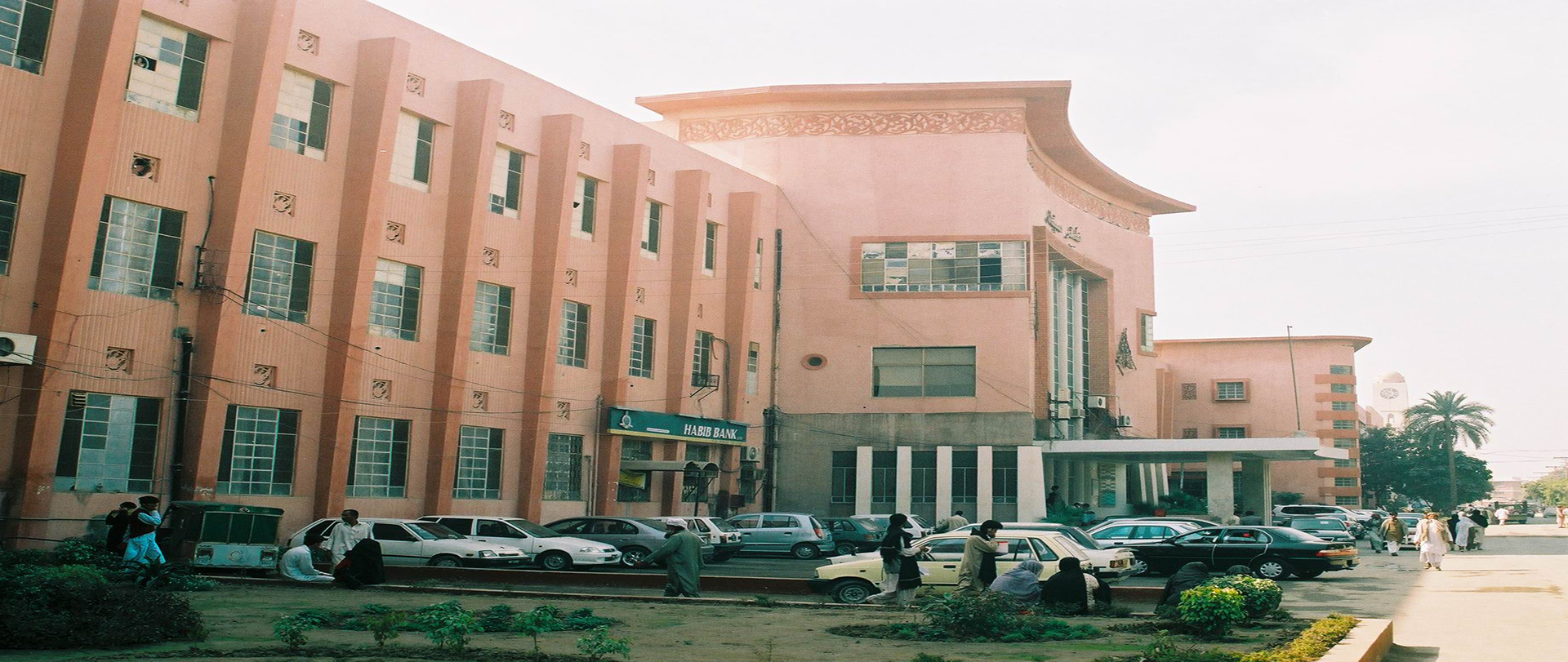
- Nishtar Hospital

Geography
- Location: Nishtar Road, Multan, Punjab, Pakistan
- Coordinates: 30°12′09″N 71°26′40″E

Organisation
- Care system: Tertiary care
- Type: Teaching Hospital
- Affiliated university: College of Physicians and Surgeons of Pakistan; Nishtar Medical University

Services
- Beds: 1800

History
- Founded: 1 October 1953

Links
- Website: www.nmch-edu.pk
- Lists: Hospitals in Pakistan

Nishtar Hospital is a teaching hospital of Nishtar Medical University, located in Multan, Pakistan. It is a tertiary care hospital, owned by the Government of Punjab. It serves a large population of South Punjab.

== Accredited hospital ==
Nishtar Hospital is accredited by the College of Physicians and Surgeons of Pakistan.

== History ==
It is named after Sardar Abdur Rab Nishtar, former Governor of Punjab, Pakistan, a Pakistan Movement activist, a celebrated companion of the Father of Nation, Muhammad Ali Jinnah.

The construction of the Nishtar Hospital block started in 1953. The basic idea and its plan were provided by Dr. M. J. Bhutta. It started functioning with 80 beds on October 1, 1953.

== Facilities ==
The hospital's total bed capacity currently stands at 1,850 beds. It has 24 departments and divisions, over 31 wards, a burn unit, an outpatient, and an Accident & Emergency Department, in addition to 15 operation theaters.

== Administration ==
Shahid Bukhari has been the Medical Superintendent of the hospital since 2019.

== 2022 incident ==
In October 2022, it was discovered that multiple abandoned dead bodies which remained unclaimed were stored on the roof of the hospital instead of being given proper burial. Later, the HOD Anatomy Department revealed that the bodies could not be buried because of a policy of handing over corpses to the Police, which didn't take place owing to delay. Videos and images of multiple deceased people found on the rooftop of the Hospital Multan in a bad condition circulated on social media. After the pictures and videos came out, questions arose on social media asking "whose bodies are these?" and "why they are lying helpless?"

Police and rescue personnel were blamed by a representative of the Hospital for the decomposing remains.

=== Investigation ===
Following the incident, the Punjab government announced an investigation and ordered the Nishtar Hospital medical superintendent to provide an explanation within three days. A six-person committee was established by the Punjab government to look into the incident. The South Punjab Health Department would get the results of the investigation.

The preliminary investigation report was given to Chief Minister Chaudhry Pervaiz Elahi on October 13, 2022, who then ordered the dismissal of Dr. Mariam Ashraf, the head of the anatomy department at Nishtar Medical University (NMU), along with the suspension of three doctors, three hospital staff members, and two SHOs of the corresponding police stations.

However, the Voice for Baloch Missing Persons (VBMP) rejected Punjab government's inquiry committee and appealed to the Supreme Court to take notice of the "inhuman tragedy."
