= Medical Teacher =

- Language: English
- Edited by: Ronald Harden

Publication details
- History: 1979-present
- Publisher: Informa Healthcare
- Frequency: Monthly
- Impact factor: 3.650 (2020)

Standard abbreviations
- ISO 4: Med. Teach.

Indexing
- ISSN: 0142-159X (print); 1466-187X (web)
- OCLC no.: 720105707

Links
- Journal homepage; Online access; Online archive

The Medical Teacher is a monthly peer-reviewed academic journal covering educational topics for educators involved in training health professionals. It is published by Informa Healthcare in collaboration with the Association for Medical Education in Europe. The editor-in-chief is Ronald Harden. The journal is abstracted and indexed in Medline and Scopus. According to the Journal Citation Reports, the journal has a 2020 impact factor of 3.650.
