= Services Hospital =

Hospital in Lahore, Pakistan

- Government of Punjab
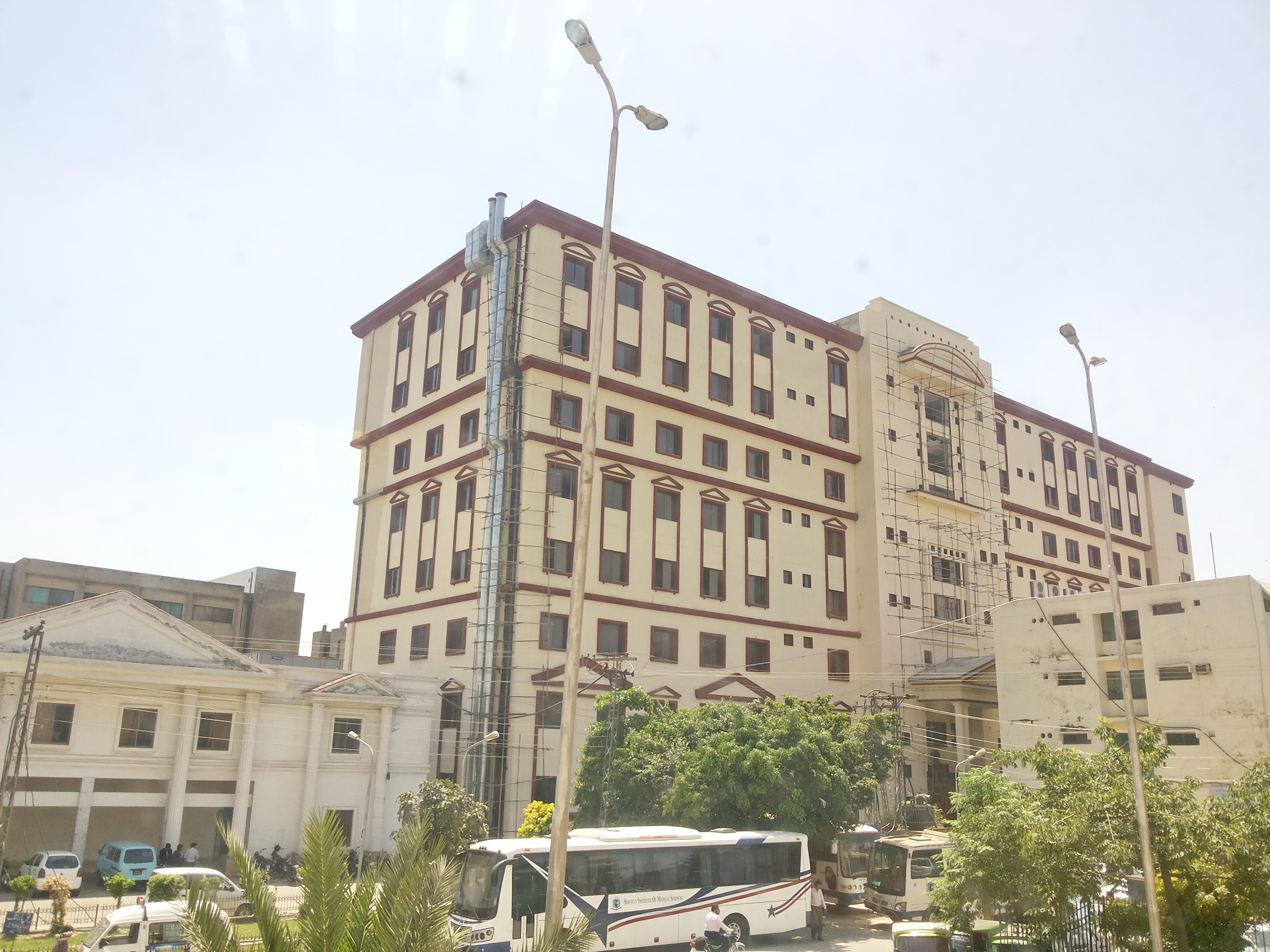
- Outpatient department of the hospital

- Location within Pakistan

Geography
- Location: Main Jail Road, Opposite Race Course Park, Lahore, Lahore, Punjab, Pakistan
- Coordinates: 31.541275°N 74.333054°E

Organisation
- Type: Teaching Hospital (Government)
- Affiliated university: Services Institute of Medical Sciences; University of Health Sciences Lahore; College of Physicians & Surgeons Pakistan
- Patron: Professor Dr Mahmood Ayaz

Services
- Emergency department: Yes

Helipads
- Helipad: No

Links
- Website: Official website
- Lists: Hospitals in Pakistan

Services Hospital, located on Jail Road, Lahore, in Punjab, Pakistan, is the teaching hospital for the Services Institute of Medical Sciences (SIMS).

== Recognized institution ==
It is recognized by the Pakistan Medical Commission for its undergraduate program as well as by the College of Physicians and Surgeons Pakistan for its postgraduate training.

== History ==
Services Hospital, Accident & Emergency

Initially established in 1958, Services Hospital began as a small outdoor hospital for government employees, as a satellite clinic of Mayo Hospital. It initially had 60 beds to provide basic health facilities. In 1960, it was named Wahdat Hospital, and was subsequently renamed Services Hospital. The hospital has significantly expanded and undergone major transformations since then. The transformation began when it was declared a teaching hospital affiliated with Allama Iqbal Medical College (AIMC) in 1977. In 1995, the hospital became the teaching hospital for Gulab Devi Postgraduate Medical Institute. In 1999, it was declared an autonomous medical institute, with a management board to oversee operations and provide policy guidelines. In 2002, the Services Hospital was declared the teaching hospital for the newly established Services Institute of Medical Sciences.

Today, its 1,196 beds are spread across 31 departments, with 27 major and 8 minor operating theaters and an out-patient attendance of 700 patients per day on average. Fiscal constraints have led the hospital's leadership to seek alternative funding methods, including philanthropic support. The hospital's aging infrastructure remains severely overstretched, resulting in electrical overload and fire incidents.

== School of Nursing at Services Hospital Lahore ==
The School of Nursing is situated next to the hospital and has an educated teaching staff. It takes on students every year for a three-year training program leading to a degree in nursing.

This school is supervised by Pakistan Nursing Council. The PNC (established in 1948) is an autonomous, regulatory body that licenses Nurses, Midwives, Lady Health Visitors (LHVs), and Nursing Auxiliaries to practice in Pakistan.

== Dealing with corona pandemic ==
Many working doctors, nurses and paramedical staff members were diagnosed with 'Covid-19 positive' leading to temporary shortage of hospital staff at the Services Hospital in March 2021.

== Gallery ==
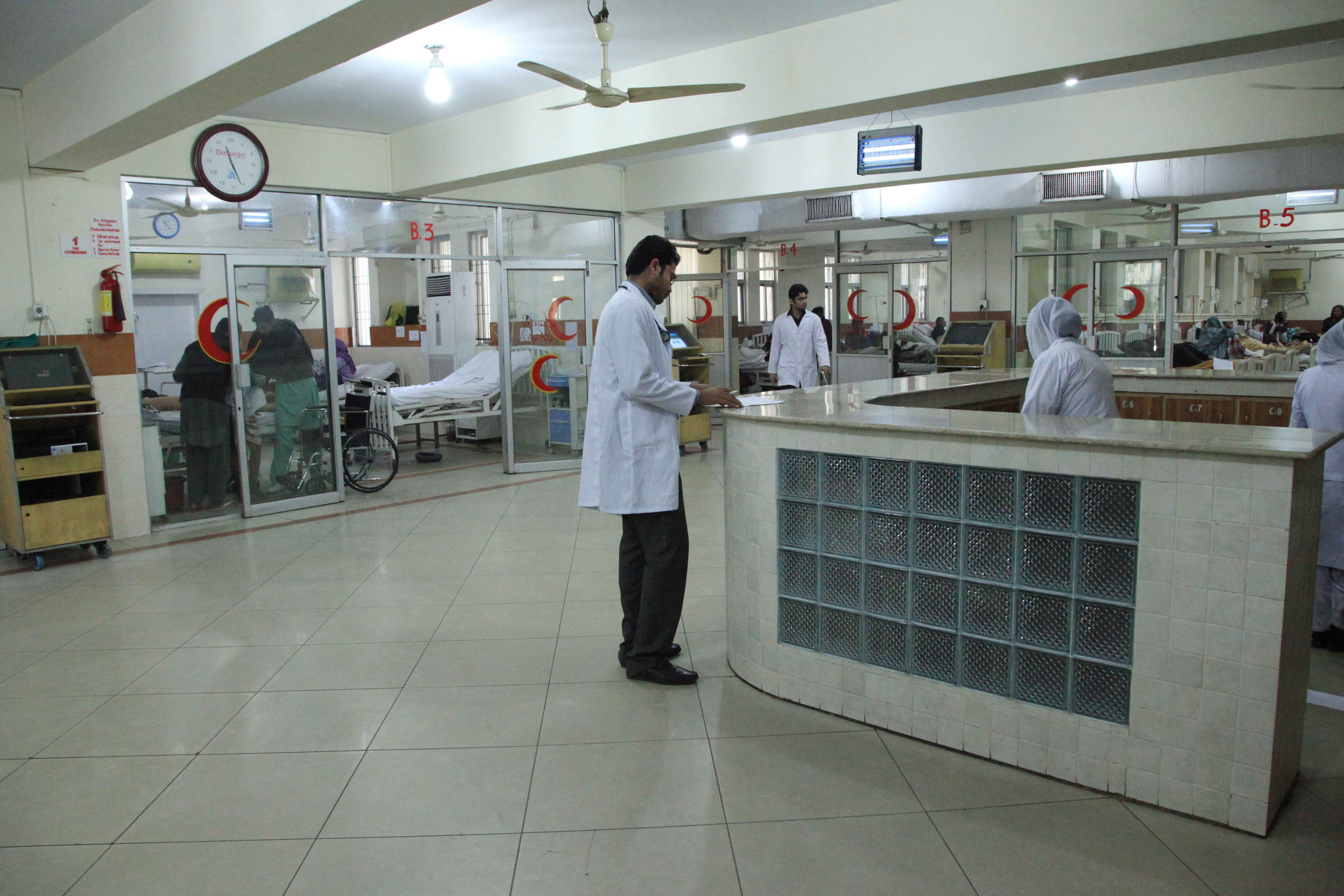
Department of Surgery SHL

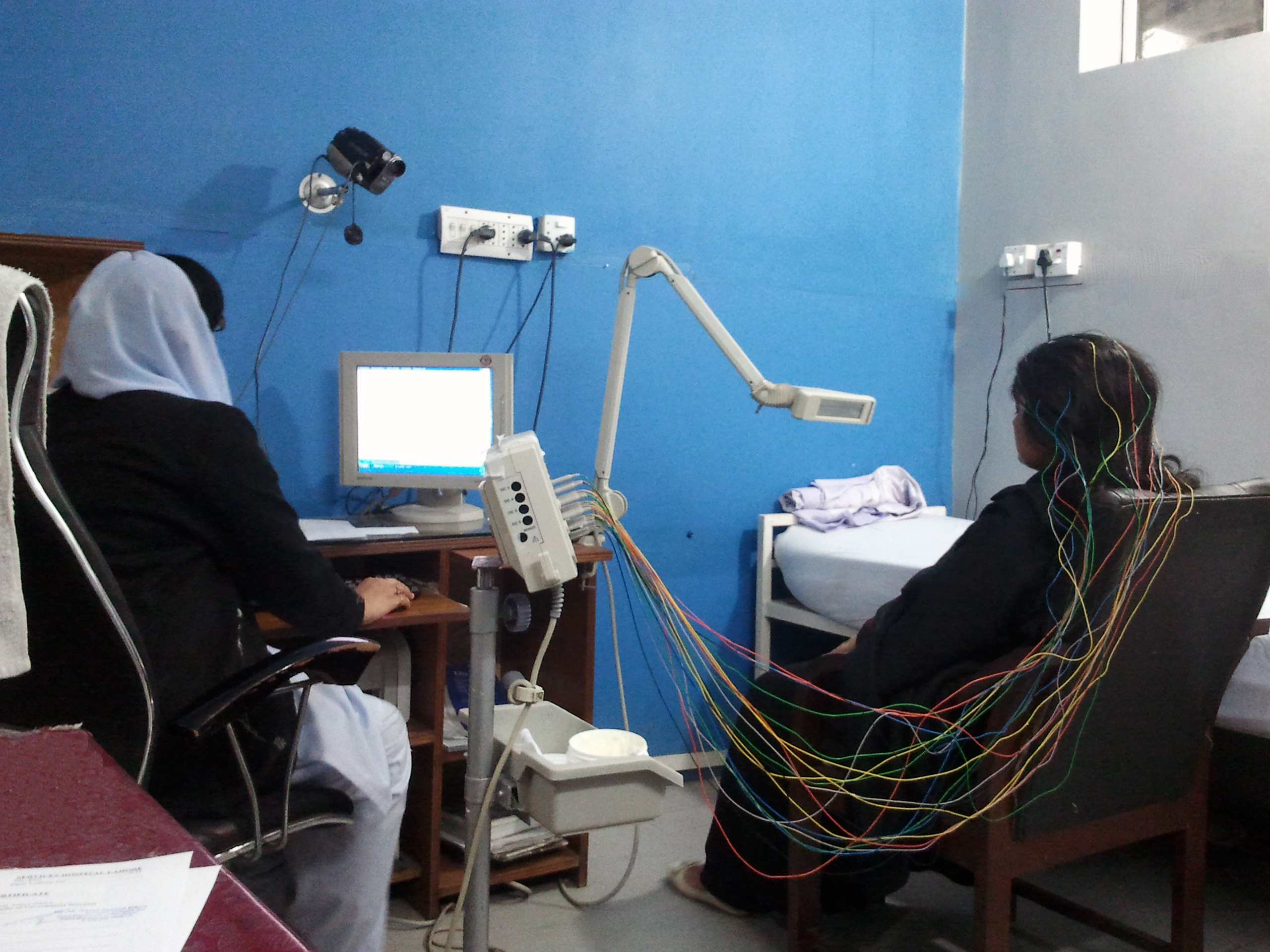
EEG being performed
