= King Edward Medical University =

Public Medical University in Lahore, Pakistan

- جامع طبی شاه ایڈورڈ
- Motto: Altapete
- Motto in English: Aim high
- Type: Public
- Established: 1860; 166 years ago
- Chancellor: Governor of Punjab
- Vice-Chancellor: Mahmood Ayaz
- Academic staff: N/A
- Students: 325
- Location: Lahore, Punjab, Pakistan
- Website: https://kemu.edu.pk

King Edward Medical University (Punjabi, Urdu: جامع طبی شاه ایڈورڈ; commonly abbreviated as KEMU) is a public medical university located in Lahore, Punjab, Pakistan. It was established as Lahore Medical School during the British Raj in 1860 and is named after King Edward VII.

In 1868, Trinity College Dublin granted students of the Lahore Medical School "privilege similar to that granted to students from English schools". In 1871, the university added Mayo Hospital as an affiliated hospital, replacing the existing Anarkali Dispensary. The same year the college became an affiliate of University of the Punjab, while in 1887, the university added Lady Aitchison Hospital as a second teaching hospital.

After Pakistan's independence, it became the only medical college in the province and in 2005 was given a charter to award degrees in its own right. It has since gone through expansion, and oversees seven tertiary referral hospitals including the Lady Willingdon Hospital.

== History ==
King Edward Medical College was established in 1860 as the Lahore Medical College.

The first academic building was completed in 1883. On 21 December 1911, Lahore Medical College was renamed King Edward Medical College in honour of the late King and Emperor.

It was elevated to the status of an independent, degree-granting university on 12 May 2005, when it became King Edward Medical University.

The principals of the medical college have included David Waters Sutherland (appointed 1909) and Lieutenant Colonel Dr Ilahi Bakhsh (appointed in 1947).

== Campus and departments ==
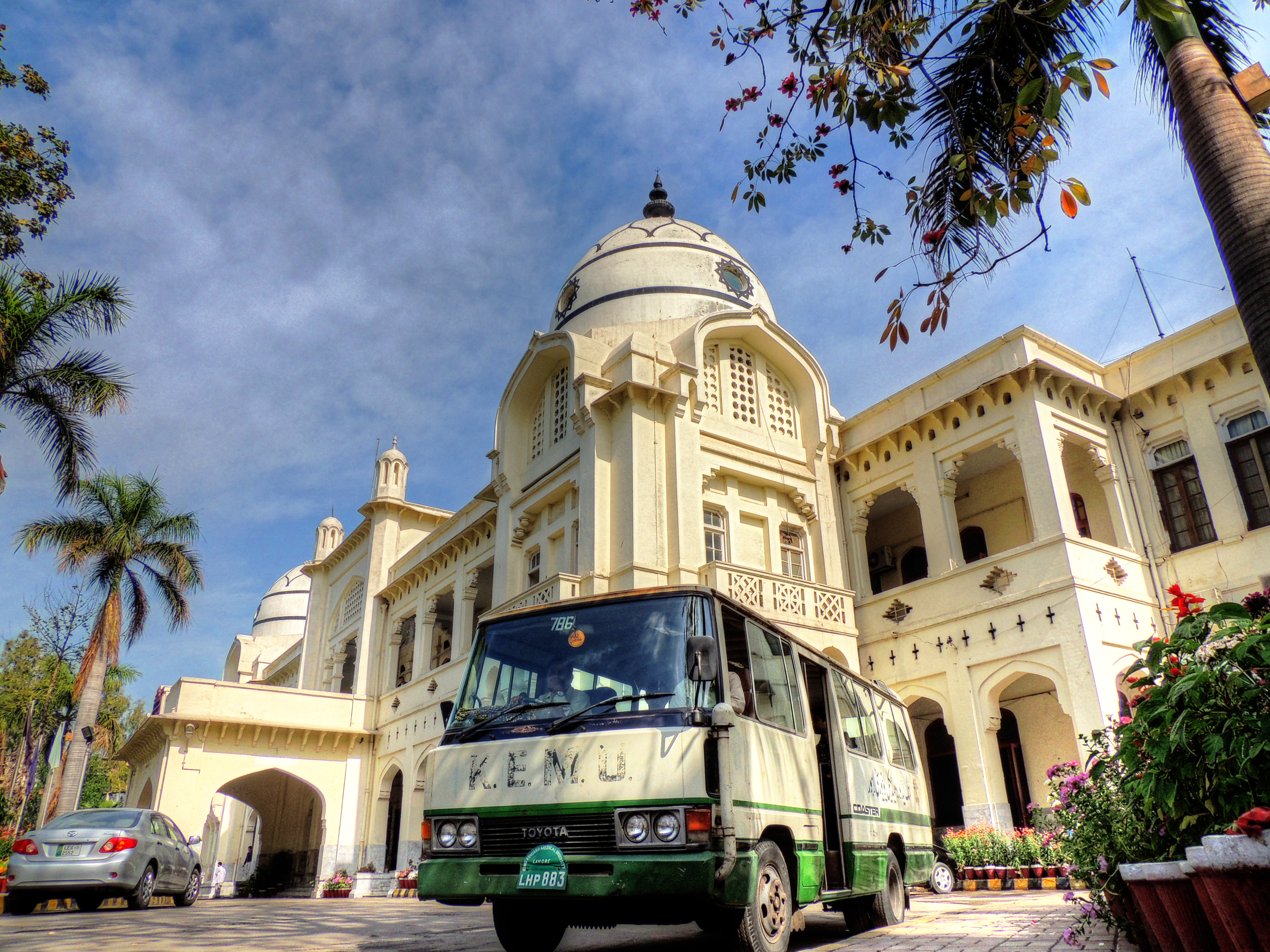
The famous Patiala Block

Administrative block

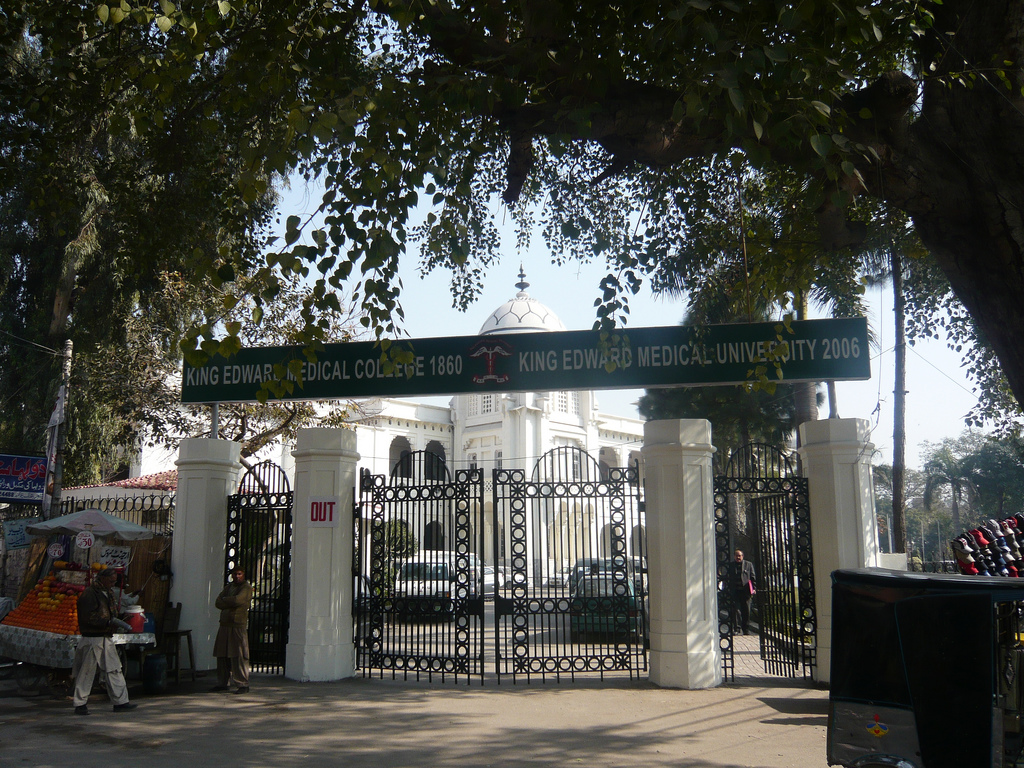
Entrance

The university has the following departments:

=== Basic science departments ===
- Anatomy
- Biochemistry
- Community Medicine
- Forensic Medicine
- Pathology
- Pharmacology
- Physiology
- Histology

=== Medicine and allied departments ===
- Cardiology
- Tuberculosis and Chest Medicine (Pulmonology)
- Clinical Oncology (Radiotherapy)
- Child Psychiatry
- Dermatology Unit I and II
- Neurology
- Pediatrics
- General Medicine Unit I, II, III and IV

Physical Medicine and Rehabilitation

- Psychiatry and Behavioural Sciences

The psychiatry department of KEMU was given the status of Psychotrauma Centre for the province of Punjab by Prime Minister's National Advisory Council in the aftermath of killings at Army Public School, Peshawar in 2014. This centre is created to conduct workshops on trauma, identify and train teams of mental health professionals and develop modules for training. The department is headed by Aftab Asif. The chief coordinator is Dr Ali Madeeh Hashmi. A technical expert committee has been constituted with prominent psychiatrists and psychologists from Punjab. The centre held its first workshop for the first responders' team and trained professionals from 1122 rescue service, traffic police, and Punjab police officers in 'Psychological First Aid' in January 2015. Media professionals were included and topics covered included responsible reporting of terrorist activities, mental health problems faced by media personnel and the dynamics between government, media and terrorism highlighted the programme.

- Radiotherapy
- Social and Preventive Medicine
- Preventive Pediatrics

=== Surgery and allied departments ===
- Anesthesiology unit I and II
- Cardiac Surgery
- Neurosurgery

Neurosurgery Department pioneered spinal cord stimulation in Pakistan. Pakistan's first Spinal Cord Stimulation surgery was done by Neurosurgery Department of King Edward Medical University / Mayo Hospital Lahore in August 2018. Medtronic Spinal Cord Stimulation (SCS) system was purchased via tender. The team included Professor Shahzad Shams (Chairman Neurosurgery King Edward Medical University / Mayo Hospital Lahore), Dr Muhammad Tariq (Asst Prof Neurosurgery King Edward Medical University, Lahore), Dr Ammar Anwer (Research Fellow ANFN-DBS Pakistan) and Dr Rupesh Jung Raut (R 3, Neurosurgery Department King Edward Medical University / Mayo Hospital Lahore). The patient was suffering from phantom limb syndrome and Medtronic Prime Advance™ SCS system was implanted bilaterally in cervical spine.

- Obstetrics and Gynaecology Unit I, II, III and IV
- Ophthalmology unit I, II and III
- Oral and Maxillofacial Surgery
- Orthopedics Unit I and II
- Otorhinolaryngology Unit I and II
- Pediatric Surgery
- Plastic Surgery
- Radiology
- General Surgery Unit I, II, III and IV
- Thoracic Surgery
- Urology

=== Attached hospitals ===
- Mayo Hospital Lahore
- Lady Willingdon Hospital
- Lady Aitchison Hospital
- Nawaz Sharif Hospital, Yakki Gate, Lahore
- Nawaz Sharif Hospital, Kot Khawaja Saeed, Lahore
- Shahdra Hospital
- Govt. Said Mitha Teaching Hospital Lahore
- Mian Munshi Hospital Lahore

=== Institutes, schools and centres ===
- Centre For Nuclear Medicine (CENUM)
- Convalescent Centre
- College of Ophthalmology and Allied Vision Sciences(COAVS)
- School of Nursing
- School of Orthopaedic Technology
- School of Paramedical
- School of Physiotherapy

=== Auxiliary services ===
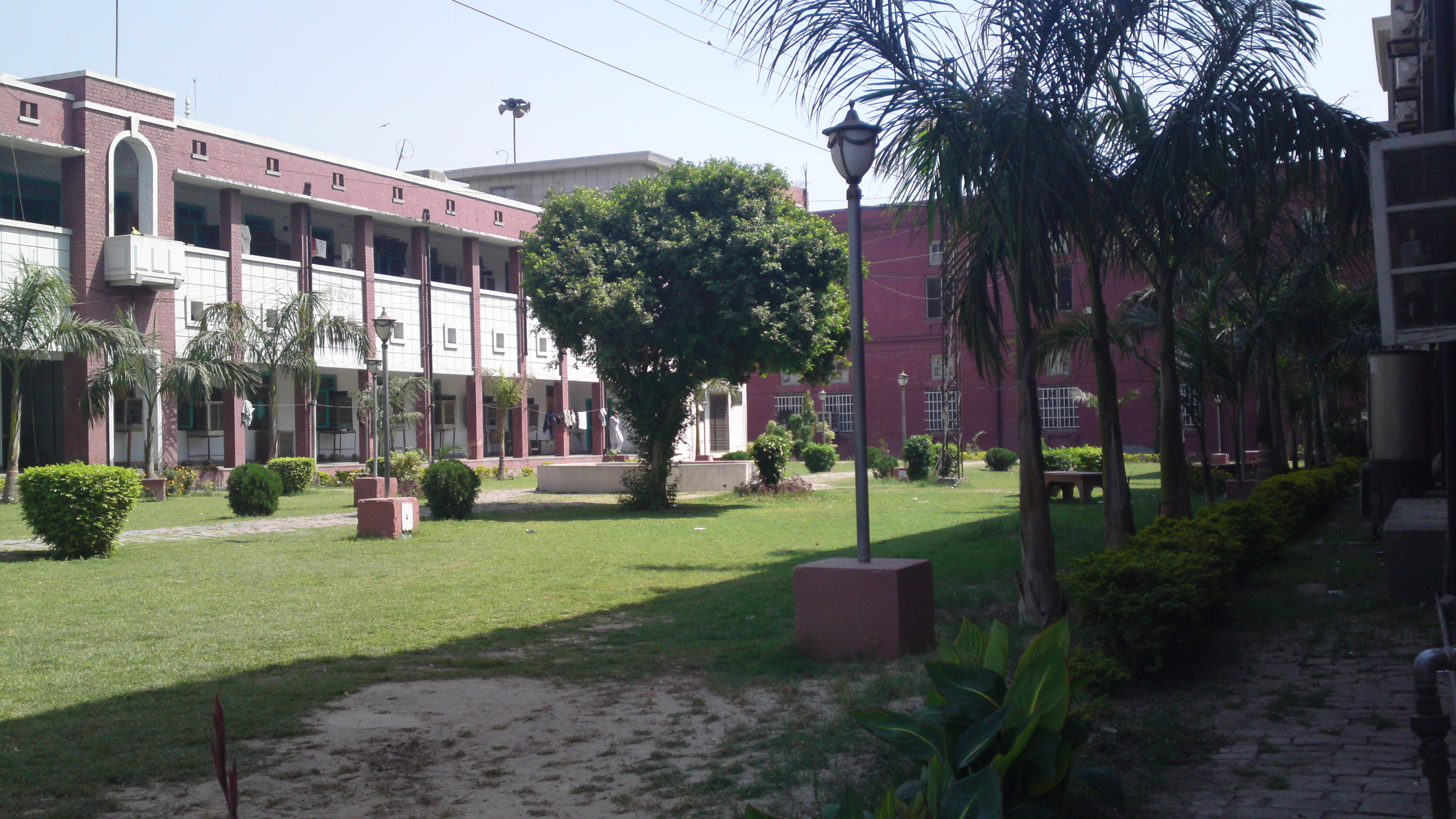
C-Block, Boys Hostel KEMU

- Library
  - Computer labs
  - Wi-Fi

=== Attached hostel facilities ===
- Boys Hostel
- Girls Hostel

=== New buildings and campuses ===
After getting university status in 2005, A new campus building was designed. The building was completed in 2019. Another building was constructed with the help of Maqbool Ahmad, M.D., a notable Kemcolian, who donated 9 million dollars for the new structure. This is the Maqbool Ahmad Block, which currently has the departments of Biochemistry, Community Medicine, and Pharmacology. Furthermore, the Maqbool Ahmad Block has the offices of the King Edward Debating Society (KEDS) and Kemcolians' Arts and Photography Society (KAPS). This block also features the Asad Aslam Auditorium and the Samina Hall, the focal venues of most university events. The university has also acquired new land outside Lahore to build a sub-campus.

== Academic degrees offered ==
=== Undergraduate ===
- Bachelor of Medicine and Bachelor of Surgery (MBBS)
- Bachelor of Science (B.S.(Hons)) in Allied Health Sciences
- Doctor of physical therapy (DPT)

=== Postgraduate ===
- Doctor of Philosophy (Ph.D.)
- Master in Community Eye Health (MCEH)
- Doctor of Medicine (MD)
- Master of Surgery (MS)
- Fellow of College of Physicians and Surgeons Pakistan (FCPS)
- Membership of the Royal College of Physicians (MRCP(UK))
- Master of Philosophy (M.Phil.)
- Diploma

== Organization ==
King Edward Medical University is headed by the Vice Chancellor; this post is currently held by Prof. Dr. Mahmood Ayaz. At any time of year, the university has over 1300 undergraduate and over 800 postgraduate students. Among the postgraduate doctors, 500 are doing residencies under the College of Physicians & Surgeons Pakistan.

Admission to King Edward Medical University is awarded to the students who have the highest merit in the province of Punjab and after primary selection, the list of selected candidates is sent to Chairman Pakistan Medical Board for approval. The merit for admission is calculated from marks obtained in Higher Secondary School Certificate (HSSC) exam plus the marks obtained in the entry test plus marks obtained in Secondary School Certificate (SSC). The percentage of each of these exams contributing to the final merit is different each year. The entry test takes place in September. Criteria for selection, for undergraduate seats, of foreign students and students with foreign examination is based on equivalents tables present for foreign examinations to that of local HSSC examination.

The graduation time period is five years. After graduation, an internship (house job) is done in Mayo Hospital or any other government hospital. The interns are given rotations in departments based on merit. This merit is determined by the marks obtained in a final professional examination and all the other professional examinations, with deductions for any failures in the exams. Of all the specialities on offer, the Medicine and Surgery ones are the most competitive and allow only the best of each graduating class. After completion of the internship full registration as a doctor is awarded by Pakistan Medical and Dental Council (PMDC).

== Student societies ==
The student societies of King Edward Medical University include:

- King Edward Literary Society URDU" KELS URDU (the oldest society of KEMU, started in 1882 as "Bazm e Adab")
- King Edward Debating Society (since 1887) (KEDS)
- King Edward Literary Society English "KELS ENGLISH"
- Kemcolians' Arts & Photography Society (KAPS)
- International Federation of Medical Students' Associations - Pakistan KEMU LC (IFMSA-Pakistan KEMU LC)
- Students' Patients Welfare Society (SPWS)
- Kemcolians' Sports Club
- Kemcolians' Dramatic Society (KDS)
- Kemcolians' Akhuwat Club (A society for social welfare among students and patients)
- Kemcolians United - KemUnited - The King Edward Medical University Blog
- Humans of KEMU is a Facebook page dedicated to the stories of the students, alumni and teaching staff: www.Facebook.com/HumansOfKEMU

The members of these societies compete at the national and international level and have won numerous competitions. King Edward Medical University Magazine, KEMCOL, is maintained by the students. The previous and current students of KEMU are referred to as "Kemcolians".

== Alumni association ==
- The King Edward Medical College Alumni Association of North America
- The King Edward Medical College Alumni Association of the United Kingdom
- The King Edward Medical College/University Alumni for all Kemcolians

== Notable alumni ==
- Riaz Haider MD - American cardiologist, academic and past president, American Heart Association
- Ayub Ommaya MD, ScD (h.c.), FRCS, FACS - neurosurgeon and the inventor of the Ommaya reservoir.
- Prem Chandra Dhanda - physician and a medical academic
- Amjad Saqib - Sitar-e-Imtiaz, Hilal-e-Imtiaz, Ramon Magsaysay Awardee - Social Entrepreneur, Development Practitioner, and Founder of Akhuwat
- Hasnat Khan - Cardiac surgeon
- Afzal Javed - OBE, SI – Psychiatrist and academic; President of the World Psychiatric Association (2020–2023)
- Faisal Sultan - infectious diseases physician who has served as the chief executive officer of the Shaukat Khanum Memorial Cancer Hospital and Research Centre
- Riaz Haider - American physician, cardiologist, author, and medical educator.
- Farid Ahmad Khan - Pakistani plastic surgeon. Former Chairman and Dean at Shaikh Sayed Medical Complex, and former Registrar at KEMU from 2011 to 2015.
- Farrukh Siyar Hashmi - OBE British Pakistani consultant psychiatrist pioneering in the field of race relations in the UK.
- Nazir Ahmad, neurosurgeon
- Junaid Hafeez - political prisoner kept in confinement since 2013 over alleged accounts of apostasy.
- Dr. Najeeb - medical educator and lecturer
- S. D. Narang - Indian filmmaker, actor, and author

== See also ==
- David Waters Sutherland (1872–1939) – a former professor in the King Edward Medical College
- Education in Pakistan
