= Services Institute of Medical Sciences =

Medical school in Lahore, Punjab, Pakistan

Coordinates: 31.48363°N 74.29640°E

- Motto: In Lumine Tuo Videbimus Lumen
- Motto in English: In Thy light shall we see light
- Type: Public
- Established: 2003
- Academic affiliations: Pakistan Medical and Dental Council; University of Health Sciences, Lahore
- Principal: Dr. Shoaib Nabi Buzdar
- Location: Services Hospital, Jail Road, Lahore, Lahore, Punjab, Pakistan
- Colours: Navy blue
- Mascot: Simsonians
- Website: www.sims.edu.pk

Services Institute of Medical Sciences (Urdu:خدمات انسٹی ٹیوٹ علوم طبی), established in 2003, is a public medical school located in Lahore. Services Hospital and Punjab Institute of Mental Health are the affiliated teaching hospitals. It is officially abbreviated as SIMS.

The college admits students on open merit and is granted through a centralized Medical College Admission Test conducted annually by the Pakistan Medical Commission.

== History ==
Faisal Masud was the founding principal of the institution. In its initial days, the college was located in a portion of the building of Institute of Public Health at Birdwood Road, Lahore. This institution is now housed in its new campus adjacent to the Punjab Institute of Cardiology.

== Campus ==
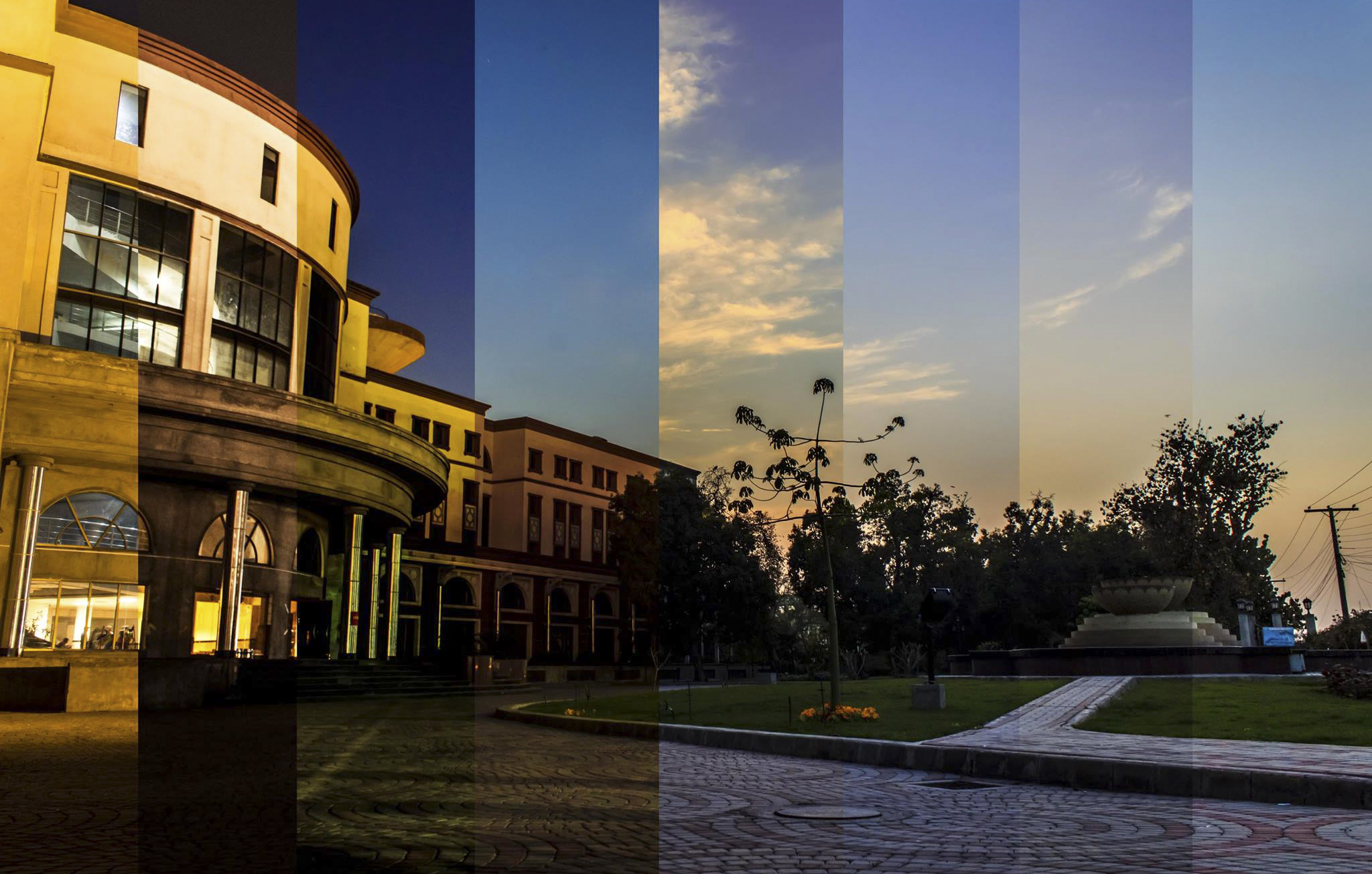
College campus

The college has five main lecture theatres in addition to the demonstration rooms. Its library has more than 8000 books and subscribes to 78 national and international journals available as paperbacks. In addition, it gives access to Higher Education Commission of Pakistan-funded electronic access to thousands of scientific books and journals. Services Hospital is a 1596-bedded teaching hospital affiliated with the institution along with Punjab Institute of Mental Health.

=== Departments ===
Its basic departments are equipped with computer aided laboratories, Carl-Zeiss microscopes for the students and penta-head and deca-head microscopes for demonstration and research.The Department of Pathology is ISO 9002 and ISO 15142 certified.

- Basic science departments
  - Anatomy
  - Biochemistry
  - Community medicine
  - Forensic medicine
  - Pathology
  - Pharmacology
  - Physiology
- Medicine and allied departments
  - Cardiology
  - Dermatology
  - Endocrinology & Metabolism
  - General medicine
  - Neurology
  - Pediatrics
  - Preventive medicine
  - Psychiatry
  - Pulmonology (Chest medicine)
  - Radiotherapy
  - Urology
- Surgery and allied departments
  - Anesthesiology
  - Cardiac surgery
  - Cosmetic surgery
  - General surgery
  - Neurosurgery
  - Obstetrics and gynaecology
  - Ophthalmology
  - Oral and maxillofacial surgery
  - Orthopedics
  - Otorhinolaryngology
  - Pediatric surgery
  - Radiology
- Administrative departments
  - Esculapio Creative Department
  - IT Department
  - Medical Education Department

Attached teaching hospital

== Official publication ==
Esculapio Creative Department is an administrative department of the Services Institute of Medical Sciences responsible for publications. It is situated in Medical Unit-IV of Services Hospital. The SIMS journal is The Esculapio.

== Recognition and affiliations ==
The college is recognized and affiliated with the following:

- College of Physicians and Surgeons Pakistan
- Pakistan Medical and Dental Council
- iMed - FAIMER
- Affiliated with University of Health Sciences, Lahore

== Gallery ==
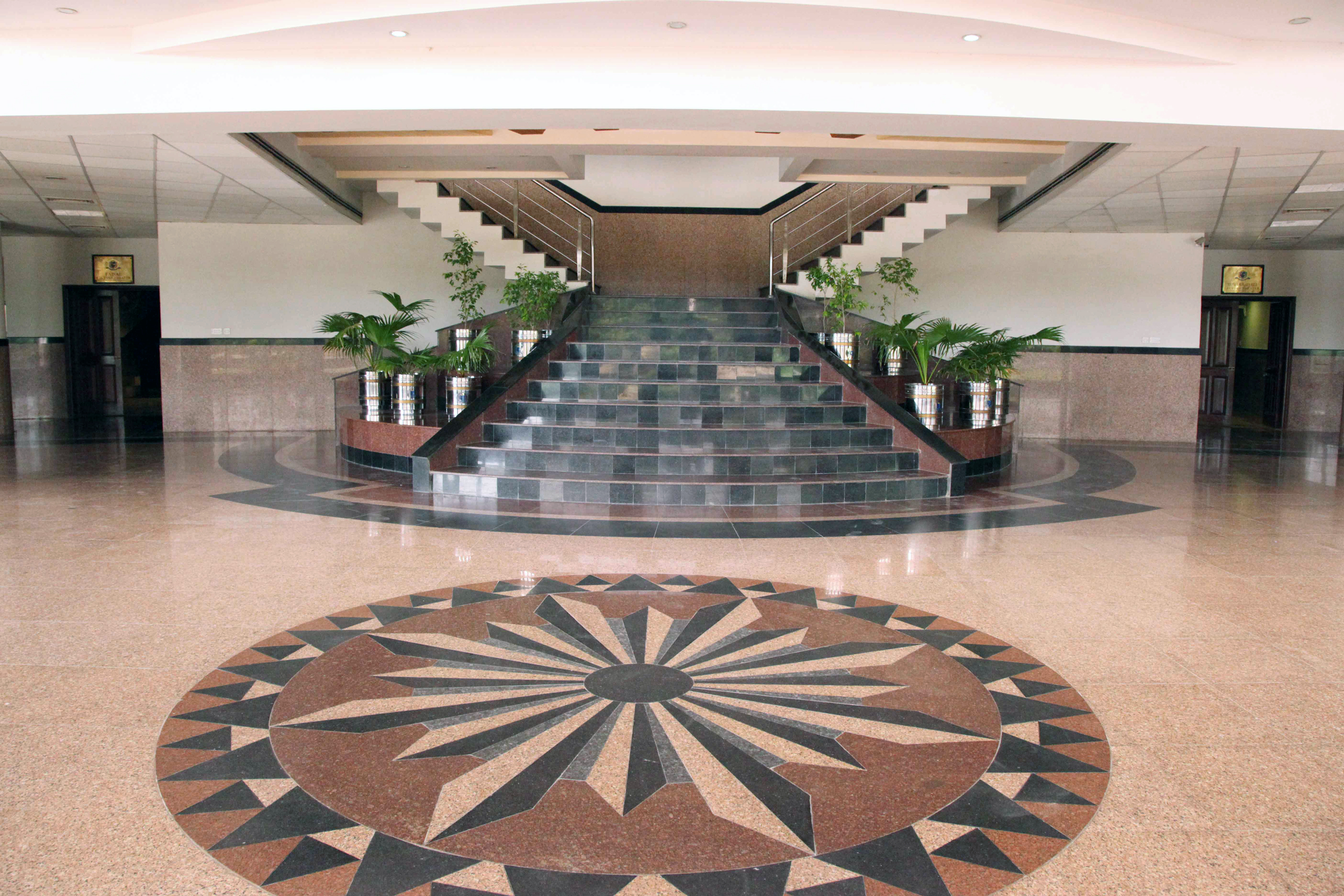
SIMS Campus - Entrance

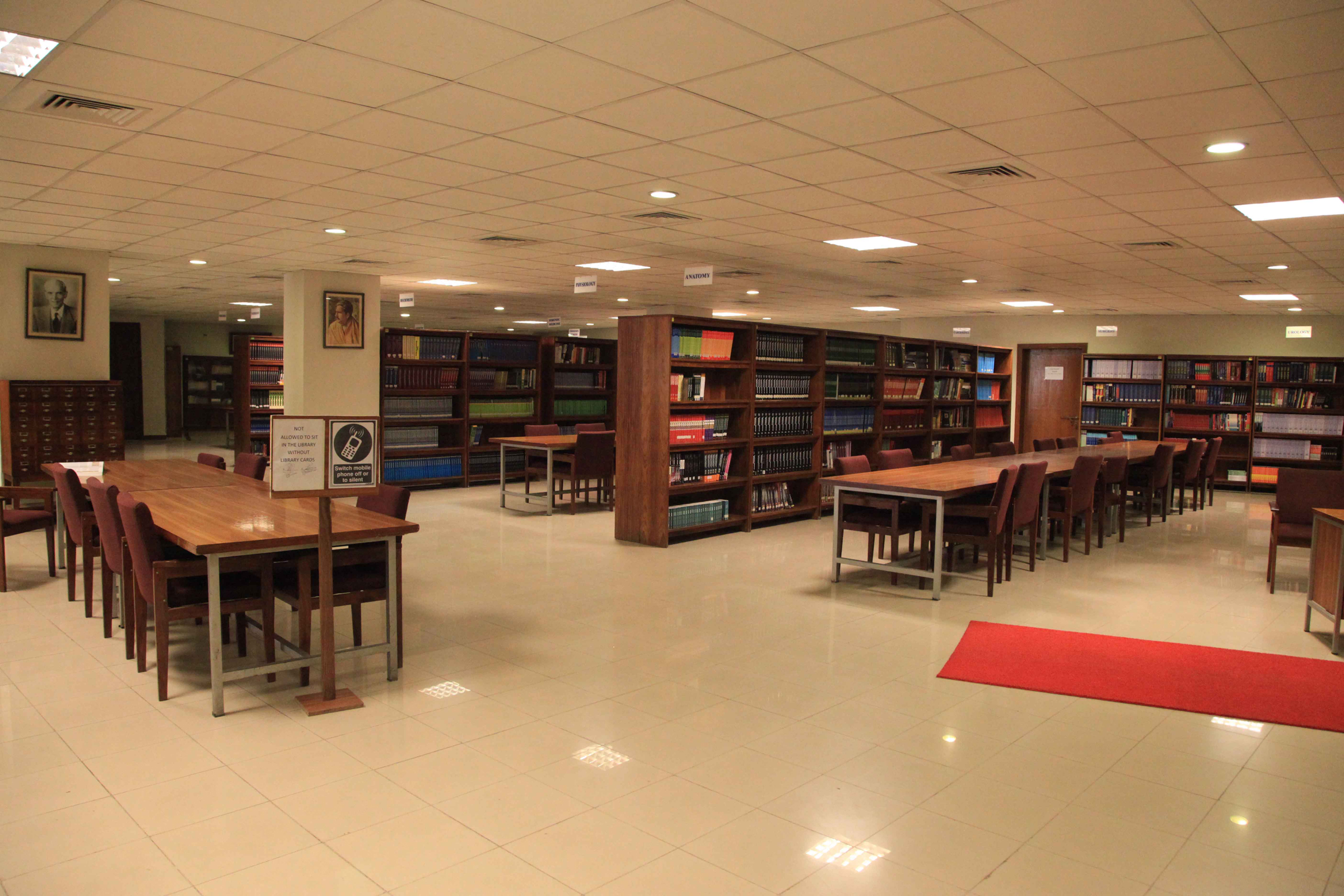
Library (SIMS)

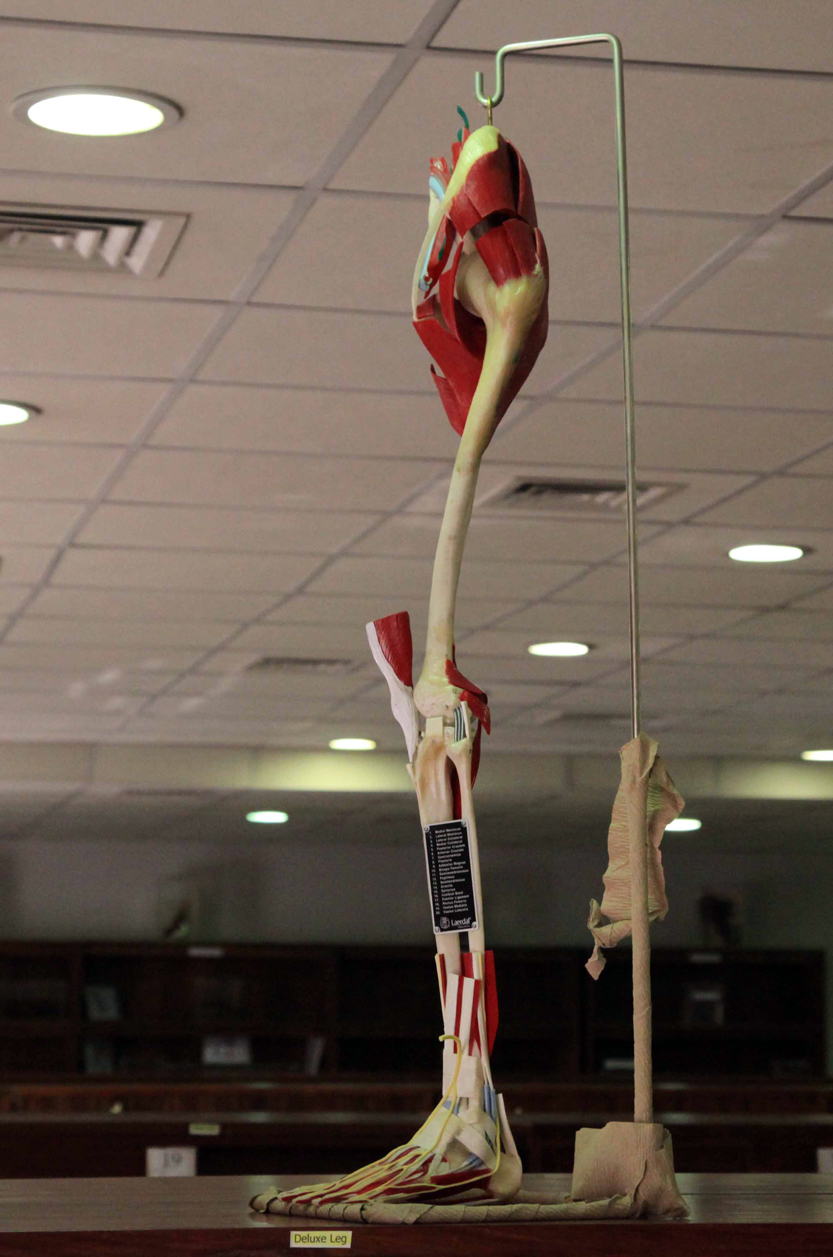
Department of Anatomy

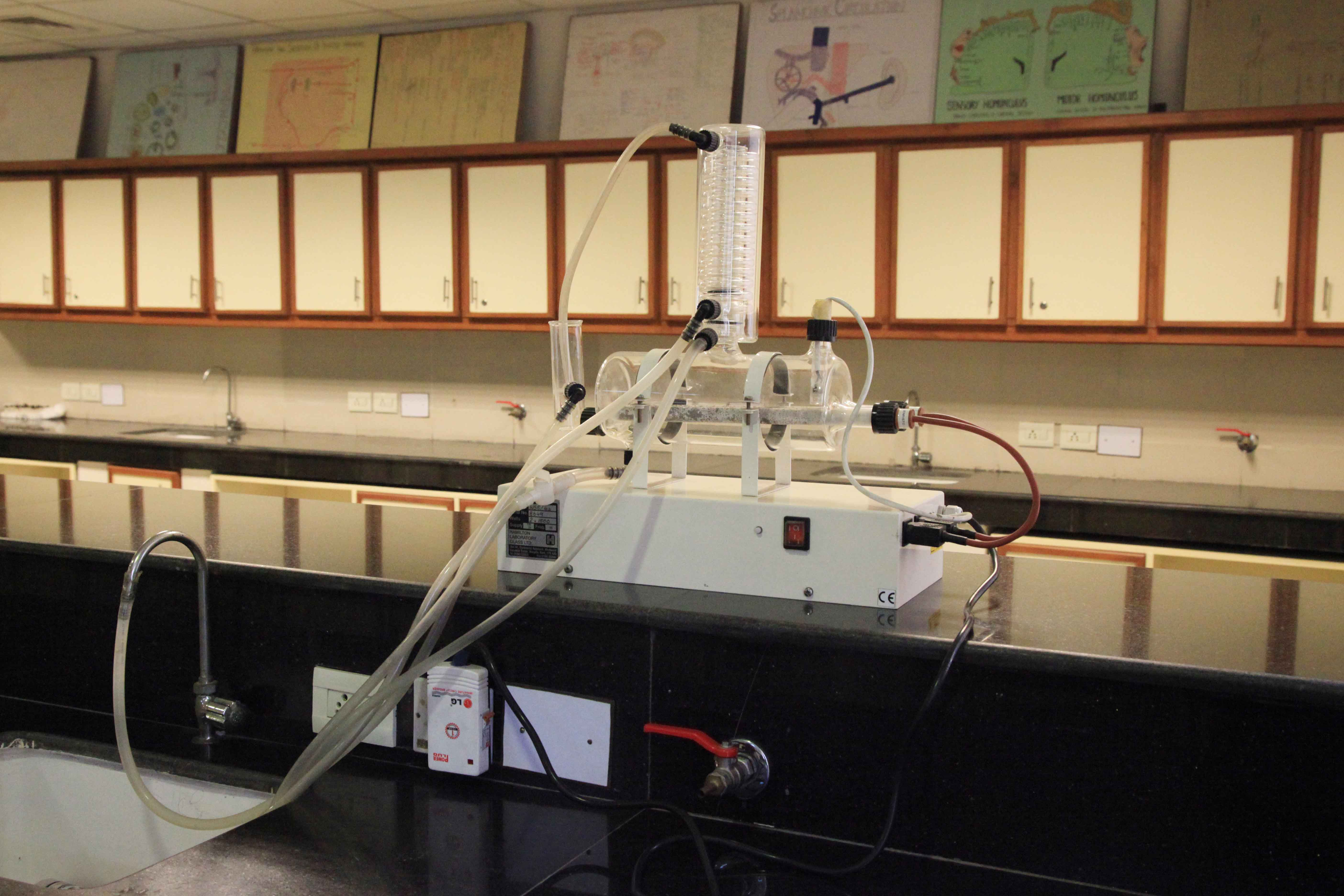
Physiology Laboratory

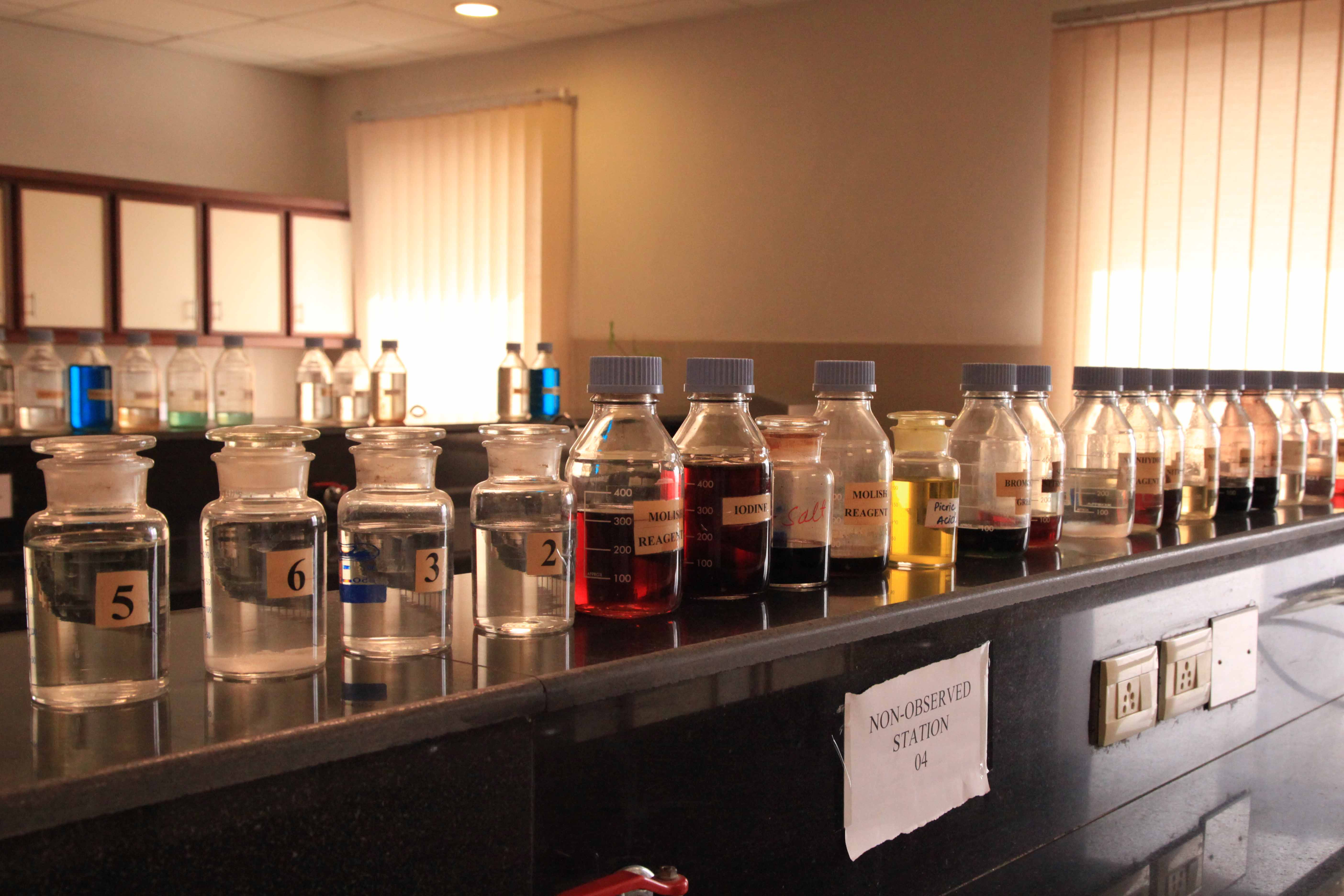
SIMS Biochemistry Laboratory

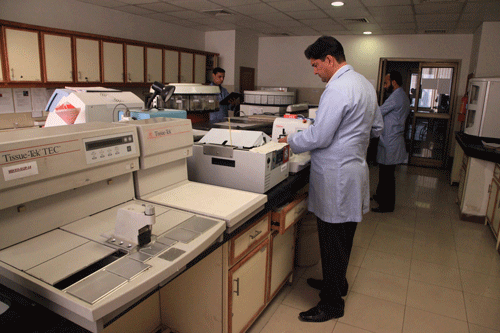
Pathology Laboratory

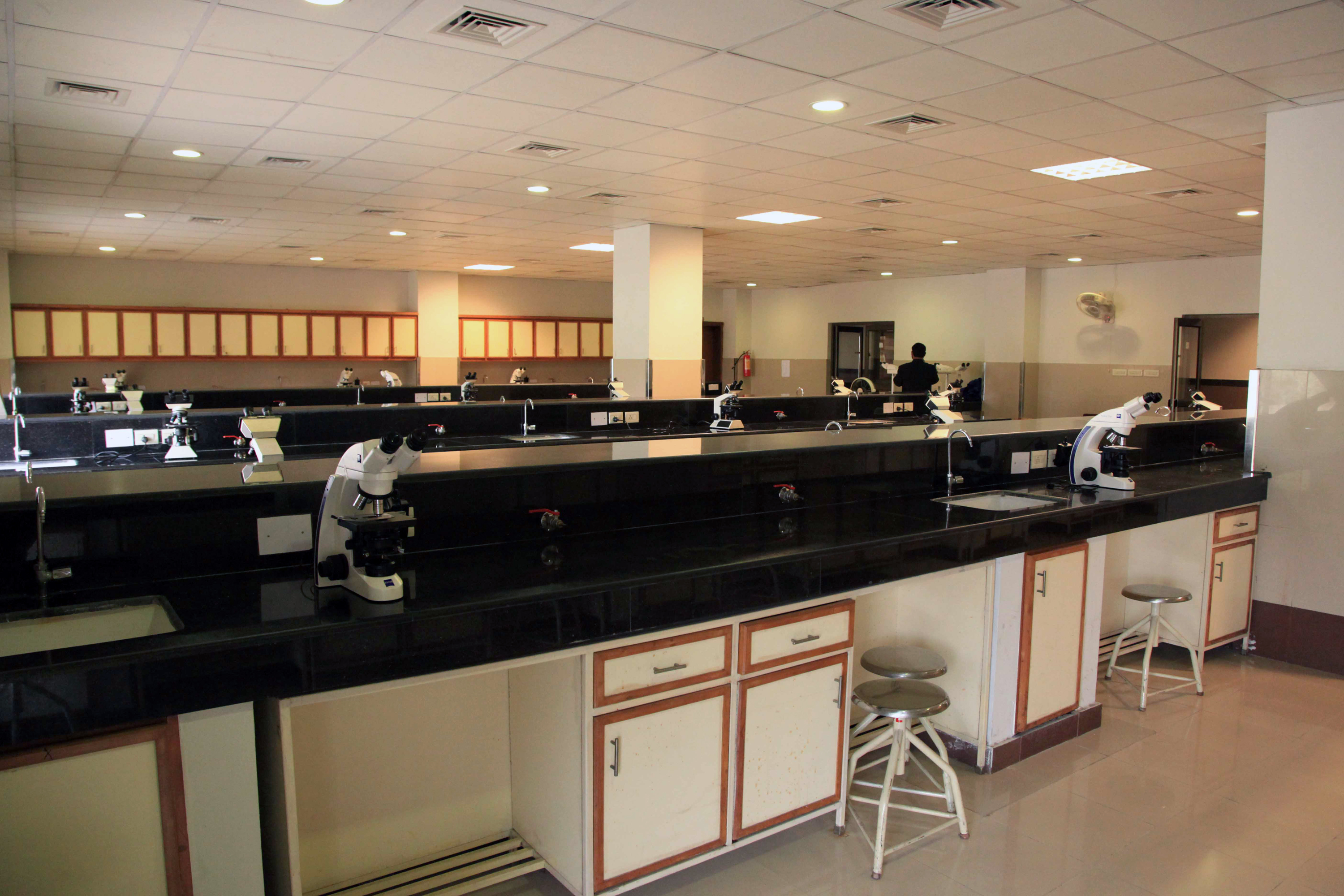
Histology Laboratory

== See also ==
- List of medical schools in Pakistan
