= List of hospitals in Lahore =

Lahore is the second-largest city in Pakistan. There are both public and private well-established hospitals operating in Lahore. The hospitals located in Lahore consist of the following:

== Private Hospitals ==
The list of private hospitals operating in Lahore includes the following hospitals.

- National Eye Center (11-A, Sanda Road, Near MAO College Lahore)
- Rashid Hospital (D.H.A Lahore)
- Bahria International Hospital
- City Hospital(Defence Road)
- Salam Medical Complex
- Doctors Hospital
- Farooq Hospital
- Fatima Memorial Hospital
- Haleema Memorial Foundation Hospital
- Ittefaq Hospital
- Mid City Hospital, Lahore
- Shalamar Hospital (Institute of Health Sciences)
- Shaukat Khanum Memorial Cancer Hospital & Research Centre
- Ghurki Trust Teaching Hospital, Lahore
- Surgimed Hospital
- University Dental Hospital - University of Lahore
- University Teaching Hospital - University of Lahore
- Institute Cosmetique
- Railway Hospital - Rawalpindi

== Military hospitals ==
- Combined Military Hospital Lahore

== Semi-private hospitals ==
- Gulab Devi Chest Hospital
- Shaikh Zayed Hospital Lahore
- Data Darbar Hospital Lahore

== Public hospitals ==
The following is a list of public hospitals operating in Lahore, Pakistan. These hospitals provide high-quality medical services to the people of Pakistan at affordable rates.

- Govt. teaching Hospital Shahdara, Lahore City, Lahore
- Govt. TB (Tuberculosis) Hospital, Bilal Gunj, Lahore
- Govt. Mozang Teaching Hospital, Lahore City, Lahore
- United Christian Hospital, Lahore
- The Children's Hospital & Institute of Child Health
- Jinnah Hospital
- Lady Aitchison Hospital
- Lady Willingdon Hospital
- Lahore General Hospital
- Mayo Hospital
- Govt Mian Munshi DHQ-1 Teaching Hospital, Lahore City, Lahore
- Nawaz Sharif Social Security Hospital, Multan Road
- Nawaz Sharif Hospital Kot Khawja Saeed Lahore.
- Pakistan Kidney and Liver Institute and Research Center, Lahore, Pakistan
- Punjab Institute of Cardiology
- Punjab Social Security Hospital
- Punjab Institute of Neurosciences Ferozepur Road Lahore.
- Punjab Dental Hospital, Lahore City, Lahore
- Railway Karen Hospital
- Said Mitha Hospital, Lahore City, Lahore
- Services Hospital
- Services Institute of Medical Sciences
- Social Security Hospital, Kotlakhpat, Ferozpur Road, Lahore
- Punjab Institute of Mental Health
- Sir Ganga Ram Hospital
- Janki Devi Hospital
- Jinnah Burn and Reconstructive Surgery Center, Allama Iqbal Medical College, Lahore
- Wapda Hospital
