= University college =

Tertiary education institution

In a number of countries, a university college is a college institution that provides tertiary education but does not have full or independent university status. A university college is often part of a larger university. The precise usage varies from country to country. Several institutions worldwide take this name.

== Australia ==
In Australia, the term university college was used to refer to educational institutions that were like universities, but lacked full autonomy. The La Trobe University College of Northern Victoria was one such college. University colleges existing today generally cater for specific subjects (such as theology or the arts). UNSW@ADFA was previously known as the University College, ADFA, and it provides the tertiary education component of officer cadet training at the Australian Defence Force Academy . It is a branch of the University of New South Wales.

Additionally, some residential colleges associated with universities are named "University College". These halls of residence are common in Australian universities and primarily provide accommodation to students. They may also provide academic support (such as tutorials) and social activities for residents. University College, Melbourne, formerly University Women's College, is one such residential college. It is affiliated with the University of Melbourne. In December 2023, SAE Institute became designated as a university college.

== Belgium ==
In Belgium, the term university college is used to refer to state-funded institutions of higher education belonging to one of the three communities of Belgium, that are specifically not universities. They can issue academic or non-academic bachelor's degrees or academic master's degrees, and they are performing practice-oriented and artistic research. Even if they are at the same level, academic degrees issued from university colleges are different from university degrees.

In the Dutch-speaking Flemish community, university colleges are called Hogescholen, while in the French community they are called Hautes écoles. However, the French community makes a difference between Hautes écoles and Écoles supérieures des arts, which are specialised art schools authorized to select incoming students. Both count as university colleges.

== Canada ==
In Canada, university college has three meanings: a degree-granting institution; an institution that offers university-level coursework; or a constituent organization (college) of a university, such as University College at the University of Toronto or University College Residences at Laurentian University.

The title "University College" is extensively used by institutions that do not have full university status, but which do extensive teaching at degree level. The title "university" is protected by regulations of the Canada Corporations Act, but the title "college" is only regulated in some Canadian provinces. Some Canadian university colleges are public institutions, some are private; some are regulated by government agencies, others are not. The Council of Ministers of Education maintains a list of accredited institutions through the Canadian Information Centre for International Credentials. Institutions that are members of the Association of Universities and Colleges of Canada are full universities.

In British Columbia, university colleges were a third category of higher education institutions offering primarily undergraduate degree programs beginning in 1989. By 2008 all had transitioned into full universities.

"University College" is also the name of a Canadian educational institution. University College is the name of the founding constituent college of the University of Toronto.

The Ontario College of Art & Design University is sometimes referred to as a university college due to its history as a college prior to 2002 when it was designated as a university under the Ontario College of Art and Design University Act.

There are a total of 30 affiliated and federated university colleges in Ontario, Canada.

== Finland ==
A classical university with several colleges is called yliopisto in Finnish. However, some specialized universities are called korkeakoulu, because unlike classical universities, they focus only on one discipline, even though they have the same status as an yliopisto; for example, Teatterikorkeakoulu, a theatre school, can be considered a single "theater college". The vocational universities, however, are called ammattikorkeakoulu. The potential for confusion has led some korkeakoulus to change their name to yliopisto, abandoning the distinction between the terms yliopisto and korkeakoulu. Additionally three Greater Helsinki-based korkeakoulus, Helsinki University of Technology, University of Art and Design Helsinki and Helsinki School of Economics, have opted to merge to form the Aalto University, Aalto-yliopisto.

== Germany ==
University College Freiburg is the central institution for international and interdisciplinary teaching at the University of Freiburg. Its main project is hosting the first public English-language Liberal Arts and Sciences program in Germany. It serves as a lab for innovative teaching approaches and instructional design. Students follow a four-year bachelor program consisting of 240 ECTS credits, and graduate with either a Bachelor of Science or a Bachelor of Arts.

== Ireland ==
The National University of Ireland and Queen's University Belfast were based on the UK university college system, and were both set up in 1908 before the establishment of the Republic of Ireland and having roots in the earlier Queen's University of Ireland which was also a university college-type system. The university colleges of the National University have since been raised to the status of universities—as they were considered for many years before statute recognition—but the system still maintains its overall federal status. Queen's University Belfast initially had no university colleges and the first university college was created in 1985 (St Mary's) and second in 1999 (Stranmillis), these two institutions previously were associated with the university, offering its degrees since 1968.

== Malaysia ==
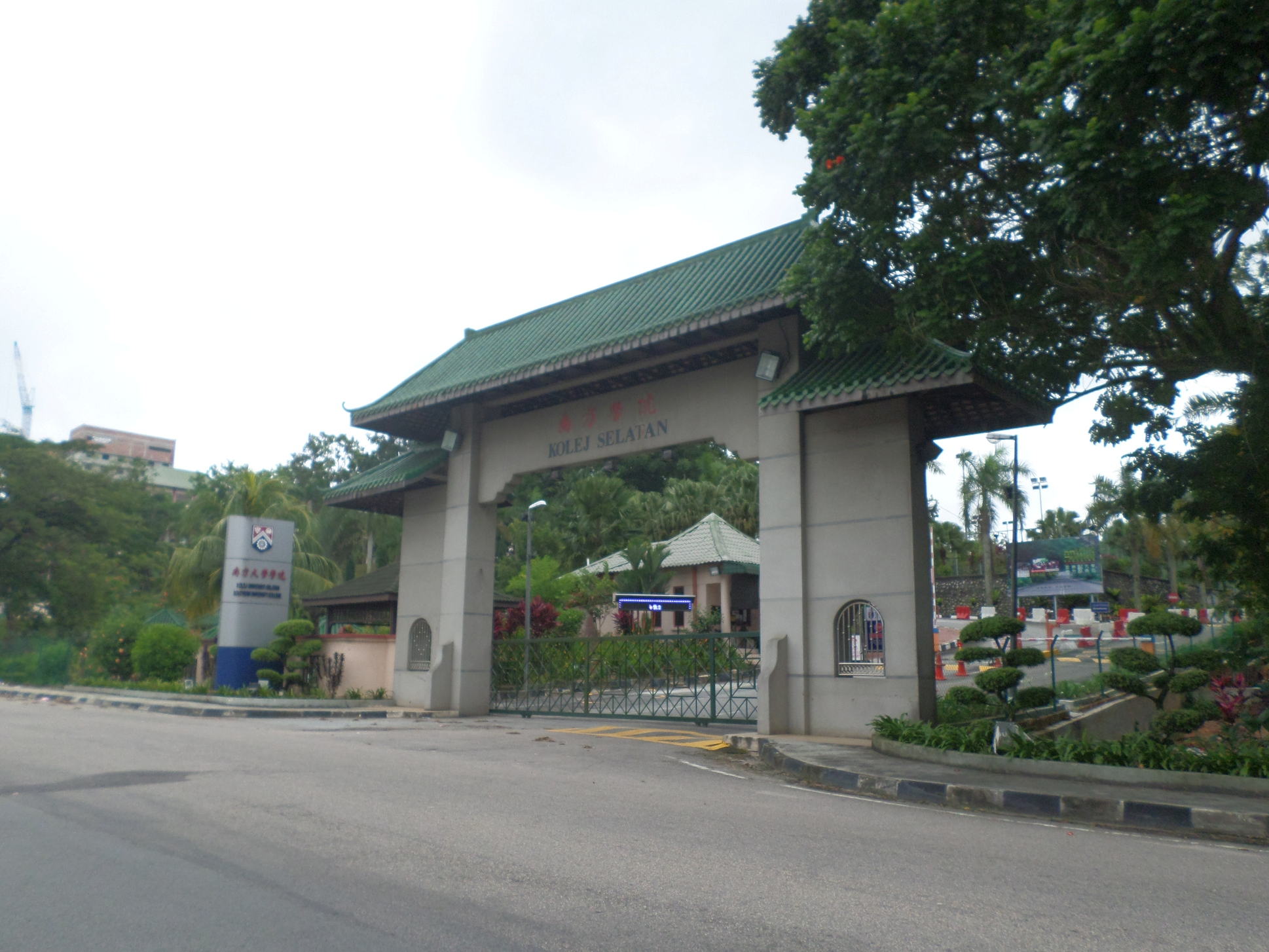
Southern University College in Johor.

The term university college in Malaysia denotes institutions that are granted the authority to issue degrees in their own names within specialised fields and disciplines. In contrast, an institution granted the status of "university" provides courses of training in multiple disciplines. The empowering legislations governing the establishment and governance of university colleges in Malaysia include the University and University Colleges Act 1971, Universiti Teknologi MARA Act 1976, the Education Act 1995, and the Private Higher Education Act 1996, the National Council of Higher Education Act 1996.

== Netherlands ==
In the Netherlands, the term university college refers to special programmes at several universities which are similar to United States liberal arts colleges in providing a broad tertiary education; students at Dutch universities normally study one subject only. The first university college to be founded was University College Utrecht at the University of Utrecht (1998); later, the universities of Amsterdam, Leiden (in the Hague), Middelburg (Roosevelt), Maastricht, Rotterdam, Enschede (Twente), Groningen University of Groningen, and Tilburg followed. University colleges are different from what is called a Hogeschool. While university colleges provide a broad liberal arts, often interdisciplinary education, similar to American small liberal arts colleges, a hogeschool is higher education context that focuses on vocational or applied training.

== New Zealand ==
Nearly all New Zealand universities were originally described as university colleges and were constituent parts of a federal body, the University of New Zealand. All of these are now fully independent; for example, the former Canterbury University College is now the University of Canterbury.

There is a specific university hall of residence named "University College" at the Otago University.

== Pakistan ==
In Pakistan, the term "University College" is infamous. Rather, the term "Constituent College" is widely used, which is quite similar to the "University College". Just like many universities throughout Pakistan has constituent colleges. University of the Punjab has many constituent colleges like

- College of Art and Design
- Punjab University Law College
- Hailey College of Banking & Finance
- Hailey College of Commerce
- Punjab University College of Pharmacy
- Punjab University College of Information Technology
- College of Statistical and Actuarial Sciences
- College of Engineering & Emerging computing
- College of Earth and Environmental Sciences
- University Oriental College lahore

== Philippines ==
In the 1950s, new academic units and degree programs were established at the University of the Philippines; the General Education (GE) Program, a series of core courses prescribed for all students at the undergraduate level were being taught at the then-College of Liberal Arts (now the College of Arts and Letters), was introduced in 1959. As a result, University President Vicente Sinco saw fit to reorganize the college into a university college, which would offer the core subjects to be taken during the first two years of the undergraduate program.

In 2000, retired educators from the University of the Philippines, led by José Abueva (president of the university from 1987 to 1993), sought to provide the quality of education offered by UP's University College to individuals who could not get into the UP System due to its limited quotas. Together with similarly minded individuals, all former UP educators and administrators, Abueva formed Kalayaan College. Under a memorandum of agreement between KC and UP, 'UP-quality education' is made possible by active members of the UP academic community being given teaching stints in KC, as well as the adoption of the same GE Program and grading system offered in UP. The college aims to develop the critical and creative faculties of its students in the basic fields of knowledge; particularly in the natural and physical sciences, the social sciences and the humanities to help them compete in a fast-changing environment.

== Spain ==
In Spain, a escuela universitaria is the name given to some higher education teaching centers where both undergraduate and postgraduate studies are taught. Together with the faculties, they are the centers in charge of organizing the teachings and academic, administrative and management processes of the universities. They can receive different denominations, such as escuela técnica, escuela técnica superior, escuela universitaria politécnica, escuela politécnica superior or escuela universitaria, depending on the nature of the university studies taught and the university to which they belong.

== United Kingdom ==
In the United Kingdom, the use of the word university (including university college) in the name of an institution is protected by law and must be authorised by an act of parliament, a royal charter, or by the privy council. Regulations governing the award of the title are drawn up by the government or devolved administration, and specify (in England) that an institution must hold taught degree awarding powers. However, it is permissible for an institute to be described as a university college without such permission as long as it does not use the term in its name.

As university college is a less prestigious title than university, institutes that meet the (stricter) criteria for university title normally apply for the latter. A subset of post-1992 universities are former university colleges. In 2005 a number of large university colleges became universities after the requirement to hold research-degree awarding powers was dropped, the only remaining difference between the criteria for university and university college title being the requirement for a university to have 4,000 students. From 2012 the requirement on the number of students needed for university title reduced to 1,000, allowing ten more university colleges to become universities. As of 2015 a further review of the criteria was under way.

Historically, the term university college denoted colleges (as opposed to universities) that delivered university-level teaching – particularly those in receipt of the parliamentary grants to universities and university colleges from 1889 until the formation of the University Grants Committee in 1919 – but, unlike in the modern usage of the term, did not hold their own degree-awarding powers. Instead, university colleges were associated with universities and thus formed a larger institutional unit while being physically independent. In most cases students at university colleges took the external exams of the University of London, but the colleges of the University of Wales and the Victoria University took degrees of those institutes while the university colleges in Newcastle and Dundee were associated with the universities of Durham and St Andrews respectively. Not all of these university colleges used university college in their name.

With the exception of colleges in London that remain part of the University of London, all have gone on to become independent civic universities. Examples include the University of Nottingham (which was University College Nottingham when D. H. Lawrence attended), the University of Southampton (associated with the University of London until 1952), and the University of Exeter, which until 1955 was the University College of the South West of England; Keele University was founded in 1949 as the University College of North Staffordshire until it was granted its royal charter in 1962 and transformed into a university. This was the recognised route for establishing new universities in the United Kingdom during the first half of the 20th century, prior to the founding of the plate-glass universities.

A related, but slightly different, use of the term existed in the federal University of Wales in the late 20th century; some of its constituent colleges took titles such as "University College Aberystwyth". These colleges were to all intents and purposes independent universities (the University of Wales' powers being largely restricted to the formal awarding of degrees). In 1996 the University of Wales was reorganised to admit two former higher-education institutions and the older members became "Constituent Institutions" rather than colleges, being renamed along the lines of University of Wales, Aberystwyth.

Northern Ireland has two institutions using the title university college: St Mary's University College, Belfast and Stranmillis University College. The usage here is closer to the older usage in England, as neither have their own degree-awarding powers but are instead listed bodies associated with Queen's University Belfast.

There are several specific British institutions named university college, including, but not limited to:

- University College Birmingham is a former university college (in the modern sense) that now has university status but has continued using university college in its name.
- University College, Durham is one of the constituent colleges of Durham University; founded in 1832, it is the foundation Durham college.
- University College Hospital is a teaching hospital in London founded as part of, and still closely associated with, UCL.
- University College London (often known as UCL) is one of the original constituent colleges of the federal University of London. While remaining part of the University of London, it has awarded its own degrees since 2008 and became a university in its own right in 2023.
- University College, Oxford is one of the constituent colleges of the University of Oxford; founded in 1249, it claims to be the oldest Oxbridge college.

There are also many institutions that have previously used university college in their name. Mostly, these have moved from University College X to the University of X on gaining university status, but a few exceptions are:

- University College, Cambridge is the former name of Wolfson College, Cambridge, one of the constituent colleges of the University of Cambridge, from its foundation in 1965 until its endowment by the Wolfson Foundation in 1972.
- Hartley University College is the former name of the University of Southampton
- Mason University College is a former name of the University of Birmingham
- University College of North Staffordshire is the former name of Keele University
- University College of North Wales is a former name of Bangor University as a college of the University of Wales
- University College of South Wales and Monmouthshire is a former name of Cardiff University as a college of the University of Wales
- University College of the South West of England is the former name of the University of Exeter
- University College, Stockton is a former name of Queen's Campus, Durham University, in Stockton on Tees.
- University College Wales is a former name of Aberystwyth University as a college of the University of Wales

== United States ==
Universities such as Washington University in St. Louis, Arizona State University, Rutgers University, the University of Denver, the University of Louisiana at Lafayette, the University of Maine, Syracuse University, the University of Toledo, and Virginia Wesleyan University use "University College" for the name of the division dedicated to continuing education and the needs of the non-traditional student. The University of Maryland System used this term as well for a separate institution within its system; it is now the University of Maryland Global Campus.

The University of Rhode Island, the University of North Carolina Wilmington, Illinois State University, Arizona State University, Ball State University, and the University of Oklahoma enroll all of their new students into their programs under the name of "University College", which does not grant degrees, but instead provides orientation, academic advising, and support for honors students, probationary students, student athletes, or students undecided in their choice of academic major. Appalachian State University uses University College to refer to the general education and first-year seminar programs.
