= Sir Ganga Ram Hospital =

Sir Ganga Ram Hospital may refer to:

- Sir Ganga Ram Hospital (India), Delhi, India
- Sir Ganga Ram Hospital, Lahore, Pakistan
