= Gulab Devi Chest Hospital =

Geography
- Location: Opposite Arfa Kareem tower, Kasur Road, Lahore, Punjab, Pakistan
- Coordinates: 31.4827°N 74.3423°E

Organisation
- Type: semi-private tertiary care
- Affiliated university: Al-Aleem medical college, Fatima Jinnah Medical College and College of Physicians and Surgeons of Pakistan

Services
- Beds: 1500

History
- Founded: 1934; 92 years ago

Links
- Website: http://www.gulabdevi.org/
- Other links: List of hospitals in Lahore

Gulab Devi Chest Hospital is a 1,500 bed semi-private tertiary care chest hospital located in Kasur Road, Lahore, Punjab, Pakistan. The hospital was established in 1934 by Indian freedom fighter Lala Lajpat Rai in the memory of his mother, Gulab Devi, who died due to tuberculosis in 1927.

The hospital is affiliated with Fatima Jinnah Medical College as a teaching hospital and is also affiliated with College of Physicians and Surgeons of Pakistan, as well as with Postgraduate Medical Institute (PGMI) and Ameer-ud-Din Medical College, both of which are affiliated with University of Health Sciences, Lahore. It has its own Medical College on its premises; Al-Aleem Medical College.

== History ==
Lala Lajpat Rai established a trust in 1927 to build and run a hospital, to perpetuate the memory of his mother, who died of tuberculosis in Lahore. The hospital is reportedly built where she died. The trust bought 16 hectares (40 acres) of land and was granted 4 hectares (10 acres) by the government in 1930. The construction of the hospital began in 1931 and was completed in 1934. It was opened on 17 July 1934 by Mahatma Gandhi.

In 1947, the hospital had 50 beds. Since it was located near the Railway Station that brought in refugees from India, those injured were brought here. Mohammad Ali Jinnah along with Fatima Jinnah visited the hospital on 6 November 1947 and wrote;

“ I visited the Gulab Devi Hospital which is now tending to the refugees on 6th November, 1947. Those who are in charge of it viz Doctors, Nurses and other are doing excellent work and deserve our thanks for their selfless devotion to this humanitarian work".

The Cardiac wing began in 1984 and the hospital is now one of the biggest cardio-thoracic hospitals in South and East Asia giving Tertiary health care to 1500 patients.

== Chairman of the Managing Committee ==
After the separation of the subcontinent in 1947, the government of Pakistan invited Begum Raana Liaquat Ali Khan, Syed Maratab Ali, Professor Dr. Amiruddin and some other notables and philanthropists to become acting trustees of the hospital in July 1948. They constituted a Managing Committee with Begum Raana in the chair to run the Gulab Devi Chest Hospital.

In 1958, Syed Maratab Ali was unanimously elected as chairman of the Managing Committee of the hospital. On his demise in 1961, the mantle passed to Syed Wajid Ali, who was elected as chairman for life. Syed Wajid Ali, elected Syed Shahid Ali and on his resignation, Mrs. Manzoor Ellahi was unanimously elected as chairperson of the Managing Committee in a meeting held on 15 June 2013. On the resignation of Mrs. Manzoor Ellahi, Syed Shahid Ali was unanimously elected as chairman of Managing Committee in a meeting held on 12 June 2014.

== Departments ==
- Out-Patients Department
- DOTS/DOTS PLUS
- In-Patients Department
- TB Wards
- Chest Surgical And Emergency Unit
- Anesthesia Department
- Chest ICU
- Oncology (Cancer) Ward
- Asthma Ward
- Asthma Clinic
- Bronchoscopy Unit
- Cardiac Complex
- Cardiac Surgery
- Pathology Department
- Radiology Department
- Computer Section
- Social Welfare Department
- Society for Rehabilitation of Patients
- Gulab Devi Post Graduate Medical Institute
- Al- Aleem Medical College
- Library
