= Lahore General Hospital =

Public hospital in Lahore, Pakistan

Geography
- Location: Lahore, Punjab, Pakistan
- Coordinates: 31°27′25″N 74°21′03″E

Organisation
- Care system: Public Sector hospital
- Type: General
- Affiliated university: Ameer-ud-Din Medical College; Postgraduate Medical Institute

Services
- Beds: 1600

Helipads
- Helipad: No

History
- Opened: 1959

Links
- Website: lgh.punjab.gov.pk
- Lists: Hospitals in Pakistan
- Other links: List of hospitals in Lahore

Lahore General Hospital is a public sector teaching hospital located on Ferozepur Road in Lahore, Punjab, Pakistan. It is affiliated with Ameer-ud-Din Medical College, Lahore.

== Recognition ==
- Lahore General Hospital is accredited by the College of Physicians and Surgeons of Pakistan.

== History ==
A piece of land measuring 2.8 hectares (7 acres), situated on Ferozepur Road, Lahore, about 17 kilometers from Lahore, was proposed for the construction of a beggar house. The foundation was laid by Begum Nahid Sikandar Mirza, the wife of then governor-general of Pakistan Iskander Mirza, on 27 February 1958. The first phase of the building was completed in late 1958. An opening ceremony took place on 30 September 1958, led by Nahid Mirza.

For certain reasons, the proposed beggar house plan was abandoned, and it was decided by the government leaders at the time to provide health facilities to the general public, leading to the creation of the hospital. At that time, the hospital was used as a convalescent home to accommodate the overflow of patients from Mayo Hospital in Lahore, as Lahore General Hospital lacked adequate treatment and diagnostic facilities.

The neurosurgery department of King Edward Medical College in Lahore was established at the hospital in 1966. This department was temporarily housed in an old building until 1981. After the creation of the Postgraduate Medical Institute in Lahore in 1974, Lahore General Hospital was affiliated with the Institute in July 1975.

In 1995, on the shifting of Allama Iqbal Medical College to a new campus, the Jinnah Hospital complex was affiliated with AIMC and PGMI was shifted to Services Hospital, Lahore. The Lahore General Hospital was attached with AIMC. This continued till 31 May 1997. Then, again, LGH was attached with PGMI on 31 May 1997. At present, all these departments are attached with PGMI Lahore, including the neurosurgery department.

On 1 July 1998, Lahore General Hospital was declared autonomous. Dr. Sabiha Khurshid Ahmad was appointed as the first chief executive. Following its autonomy, new urology and orthopedics operation theaters were established, reduced the significant burden of SOT. SOT was renovated, and a new recovery room was added. A laundry plant was also installed, and seven rooms for private patients were added in the general ward, along with eighteen rooms in the neurosurgery department.

In 2017, it became the first public sector hospital at which a laparoscopic sleeve gastrectomy was performed. It was recently exempted from all utility taxes.

On 12 December 2020, Punjab Chief Minister Sardar Usman Buzdar announced an expansion of the hospital, which would include 400 beds in the general ward, 400 beds in cardiology, and 200 beds in blood diseases wards.

== Clinical departments ==
1. Anatomy
2. Biochemistry
3. Dermatology
4. Medicine
5. Neurology
6. Obstetrics & gynaecology
7. Orthopedics
8. Pathology
9. Pharmacology
10. Plastic surgery
11. Pulmonology
12. Urology
13. Anesthesia
14. Community medicine
15. Forensic medicine
16. Nephrology
17. Neurosurgery
18. Ophthalmology
19. Otorhinolaryngology / ENT
20. Pediatrics
21. Physiology
22. Psychiatry
23. Radiology
24. Surgery
