= Ganga Ram =

Indian architect and engineer (1851–1927)

Rai Bahadur Sir Ganga Ram Agarwal CIE, MVO
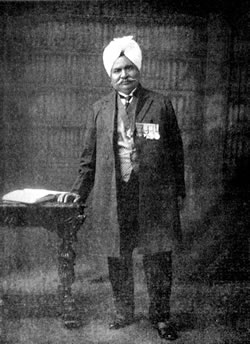
- Born: Ganga Ram Agarwal; 13 April 1851; Mangtanwala, Sheikhupura, Punjab, British India (now in Punjab, Pakistan)
- Died: 10 July 1927 (aged 76); London, United Kingdom
- Resting place: Portion of remains scattered in Ganges while the rest are stored in the Samadhi of Sir Ganga Ram in Lahore
- Monuments: Samadhi of Sir Ganga Ram near Taxali Gate, Lahore
- Other name: "Father of Modern Lahore"
- Education: GCU Lahore; Thomason College of Civil Engineering (now IIT Roorkee)
- Occupation: Civil engineer
- Known for: General Post Office, Lahore; Lahore Museum; Aitchison College, Lahore; Mayo School of Arts; Sir Ganga Ram Hospital; Mayo Hospital, Lahore; Sir Ganga Ram High School; Hailey College of Commerce; The Mall, Lahore
- Relatives: Ashwin Ram; Shreela Flather; Kesha Ram

Signature
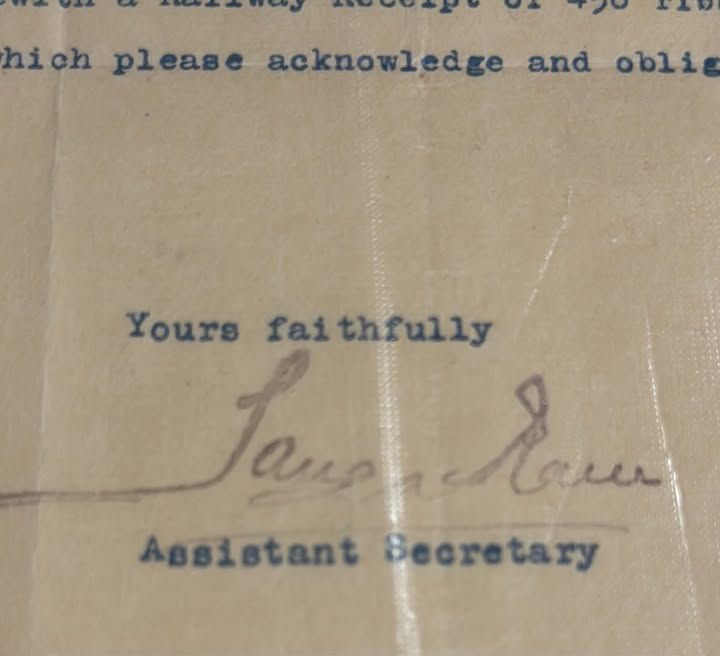

Rai Bahadur Sir Ganga Ram CIE MVO (born Ganga Ram Agarwal; 13 April 1851 – 10 July 1927) was an Indian civil engineer and architect. In view of his extensive contributions to the urban fabric of Lahore, then in British India and now in modern Pakistan, journalist Khaled Ahmed described him as "The Father of Modern Lahore".

== Early life ==
Ganga Ram Agarwal was born on 13 April 1851 in Mangtanwala, a village in Sheikhupura District in the Punjab Province of British India (now in the Nankana Sahib District of Punjab, Pakistan) into an Agrawal Punjabi Hindu family. His father, Doulat Ram, was a junior subinspector at a police station in Mangtanwala. Later, he shifted to Amritsar and became a copy-writer of the court. Here, Ganga Ram passed his matriculation examination from the Government High School and joined the Government College, Lahore in 1869. In 1871, he obtained a scholarship to the Thomason Civil Engineering College at Roorkee (now IIT Roorkee). He passed the final lower subordinate examination with the gold medal in 1873. He was appointed assistant engineer and called to Delhi to help in the building of the Imperial Assemblage.

== Career ==
=== Engineer ===
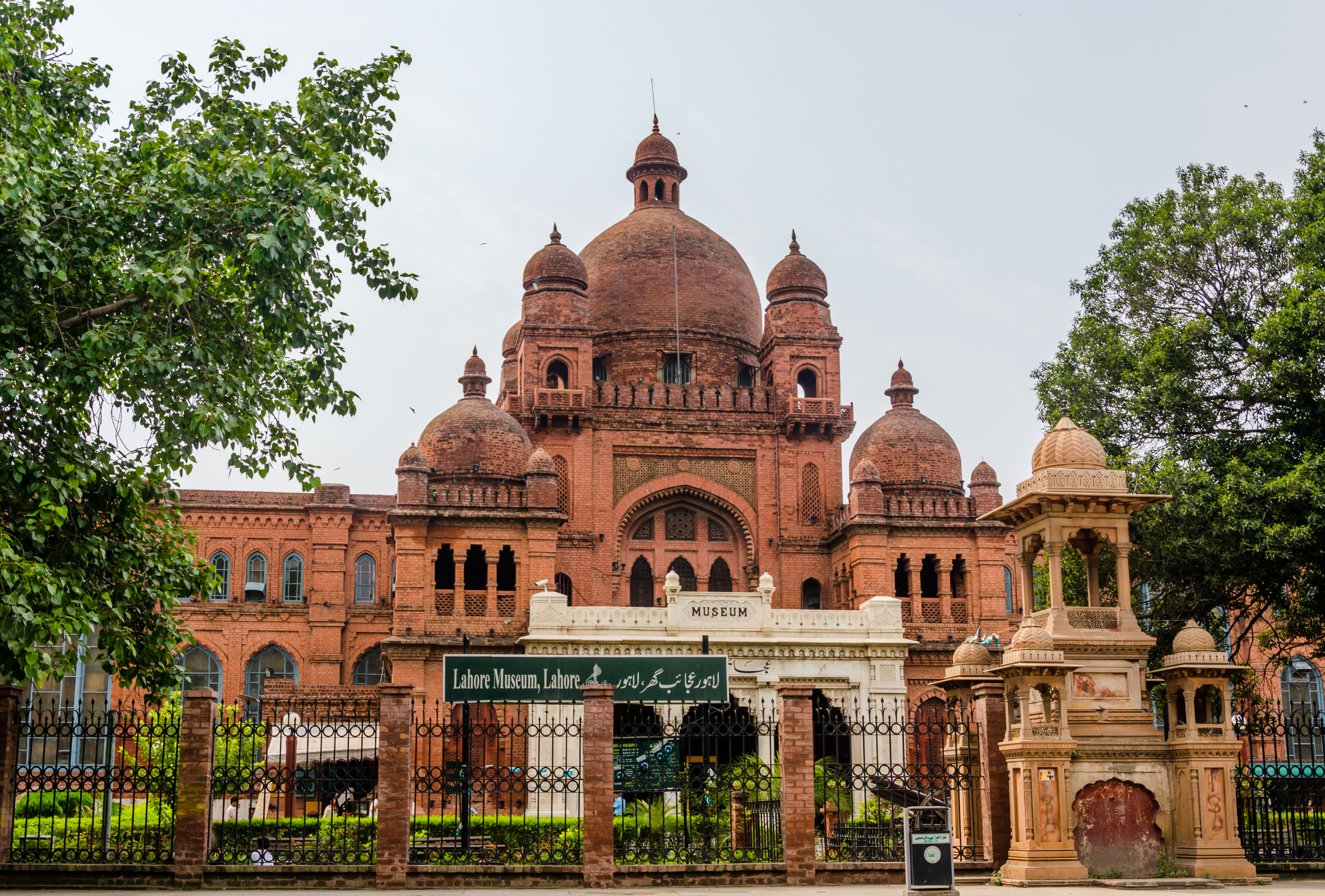
The building of Lahore Museum was designed in the Indo-Saracenic architectural style by John Lockwood and Ram Singh while its construction was supervised by Sir Ganga Ram.

In 1873, after a brief Service in Punjab P.W.D devoted himself to practical farming. He obtained, on lease from the government, 50,000 acres (20,000 ha) of barren, unirrigated land in Montgomery District, and within three years converted that vast desert into smiling fields, irrigated by water lifted by a hydroelectric plant and running through a thousand miles of irrigation channels, all constructed at his own cost. This was the biggest private enterprise of the kind, unknown and unthought-of in the country before. Sir Ganga Ram earned millions most of which he gave to charity.

In 1900, Ganga Ram was selected by Lord Curzon to act as superintendent of works in the Imperial Durbar to be held in connection with the accession of King Edward VII. He finished the work at the Darbar managing its manifold problems and challenges. He retired prematurely from service in 1903.

He received the title of Rai Bahadur in 1903, and was appointed a Companion of the Order of the Indian Empire (CIE) on 26 June 1903 for his services at the Delhi Durbar. On 12 December 1911, in a special honours list after the 1911 Delhi Durbar, he was appointed a Member Fourth Class (present-day Lieutenant) of the Royal Victorian Order (MVO). He was knighted in the 1922 Birthday Honours list, and on 8 July was personally invested with his honour at Buckingham Palace by the King-Emperor George V.

He designed and built General Post Office, Lahore, Ganga Ram Hospital, Lahore 1921, Lady Mclagan Girls High School, the chemistry department of the Government College University, the Albert Victor wing of Mayo Hospital, Sir Ganga Ram High School (now Lahore College for Women), the Hailey College of Commerce (now Hailey College of Banking & Finance), Ravi Road House for the Disabled, the Ganga Ram Trust Building on "The Mall" and Lady Maynard Industrial School. He also constructed Model Town and Gulberg town, once the best localities of Lahore, the powerhouse at Renala Khurd as well as the railway track between Pathankot and Amritsar. The construction of Lahore Museum, Aitchison College and Mayo School of Arts (now the National College of Arts) was supervised by him as well.

==== Service in Patiala State ====
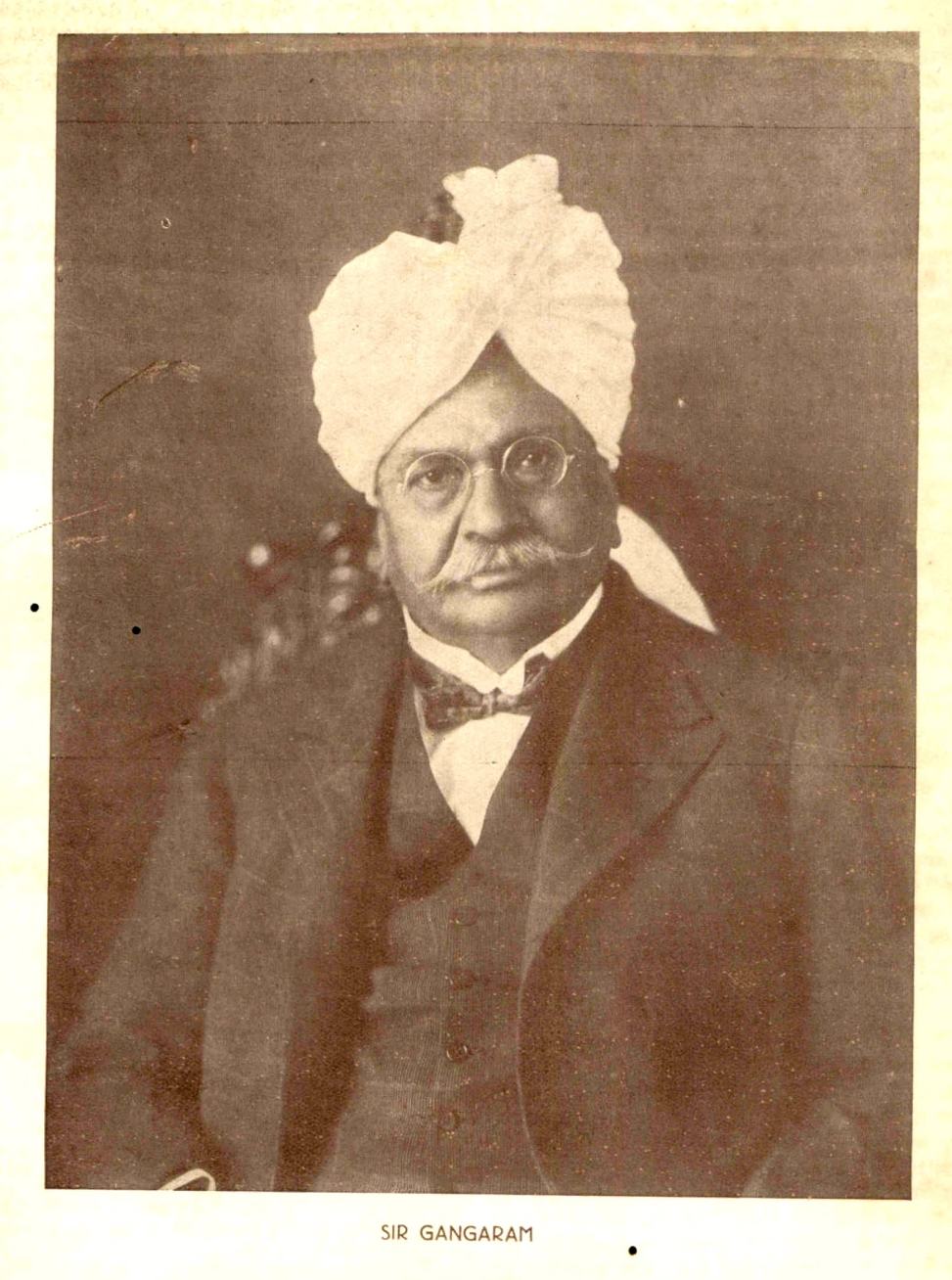
Ganga Ram in 1927 CE.

He became Superintending Engineer in Patiala State for the capital's reconstruction project after his retirement. Amongst his works were Moti Bagh Palace, Secretariat Building, New Delhi, Victoria Girls School, the law courts and police station.

In Tehsil Jaranwala of district Lyallpur (now Faisalabad), Ganga Ram built a unique travelling facility, Ghoda Train (horse pulled train). It was a railway line from Buchiana Railway station (on Lahore Jaranwala railway line) to the village of Gangapur. It remained in use for decades even after Independence. It became useless for need of repair in 1980s. It was unique of its kind. It was two simple trollies pulled on a narrow rail track with horse instead of railway engine.

=== Agriculturalist ===
He took more than 20,000 acres of land on lease from the Government near Renala and cultivated it by completely irrigating the barren land with hydro-electric pumping. He purchased thousands acres of barren land in Lyallpur on lease and by using engineering skills and modern irrigation methods, turned the arid lands into fertile fields. He established a Maynard-Ganga Ram award of Rs 3000 with a Rs 25000 endowment. The award was to be made every three years for anyone who made an innovation that increased agricultural production in Punjab.

== Death ==
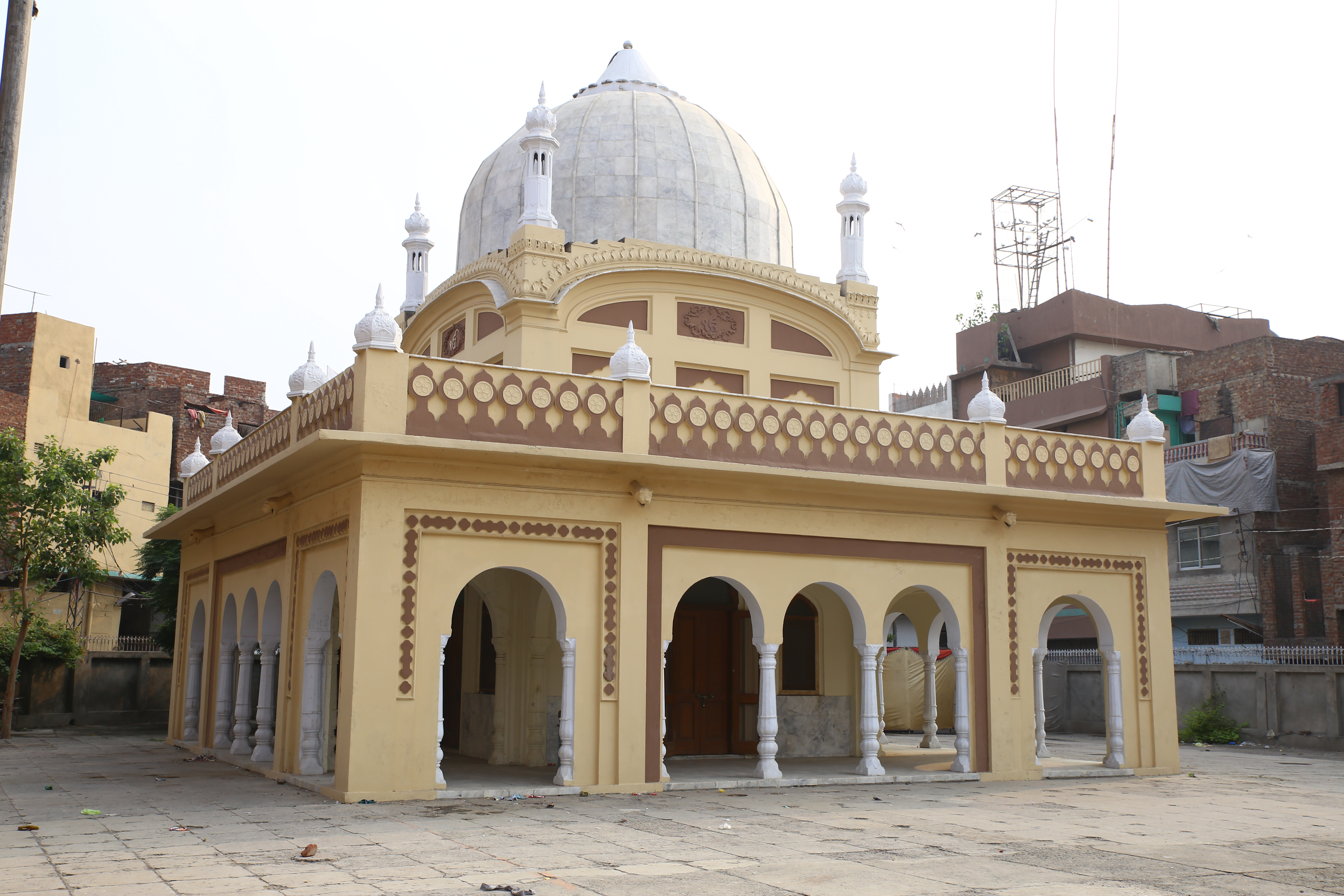
The samadhi of Sir Ganga Ram in Lahore.

He died in London on 10 July 1927. His body was cremated and his ashes were brought back to India. A portion of the ashes were consigned to Ganges River and the rest buried in Lahore on the bank of the Ravi River.

== Ram in literature ==
A marble statue of Sir Ganga Ram once stood in a public square on Mall Road in Lahore. In Urdu writer Saadat Hasan Manto's satirical story, "The Garland," set during the religious riots of 1947, an inflamed mob in Lahore, after attacking a residential area, attacks the statue of Ram. The police arrive and opened fire. As one of those shot by the police falls, the mob shouts: "Let us rush him to Sir Ganga Ram Hospital."

== Legacy ==
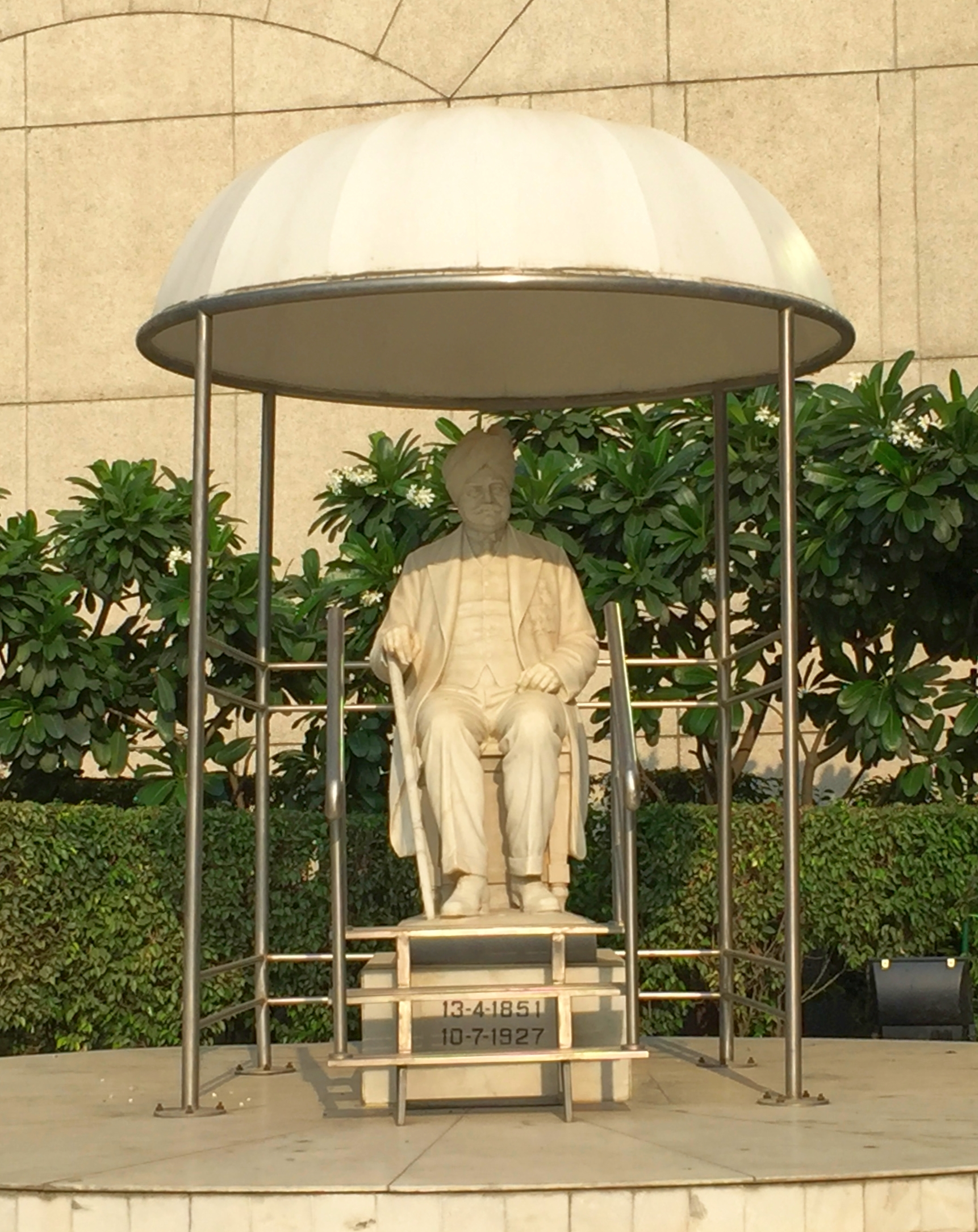
Ram's statue, Sir Ganga Ram Hospital

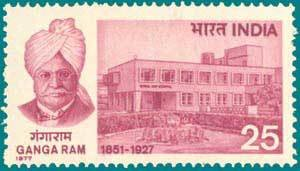
50th Death Anniversary of Ganga Ram commemorative stamp, 1977

After the partition of India and Pakistan, another hospital Sir Ganga Ram Hospital in New Delhi was built in 1951 in his memory. A student hostel, Ganga Bhawan was established at IIT Roorkee (erstwhile University of Roorkee and Thomason college of civil engineering) on 26 November 1957 in his honour. The Sir Ganga Ram Hospital in Lahore, Pakistan was partially damaged in the blasts that destroyed a nearby Police Station on 27 May 2009.

His great-grandson Dr. Ashwin Ram is a professor at the Georgia Institute of Technology. His great-granddaughter, Shreela Flather, Baroness Flather, was a teacher and politician.

== Works ==
Some buildings designed or built by Ganga Ram
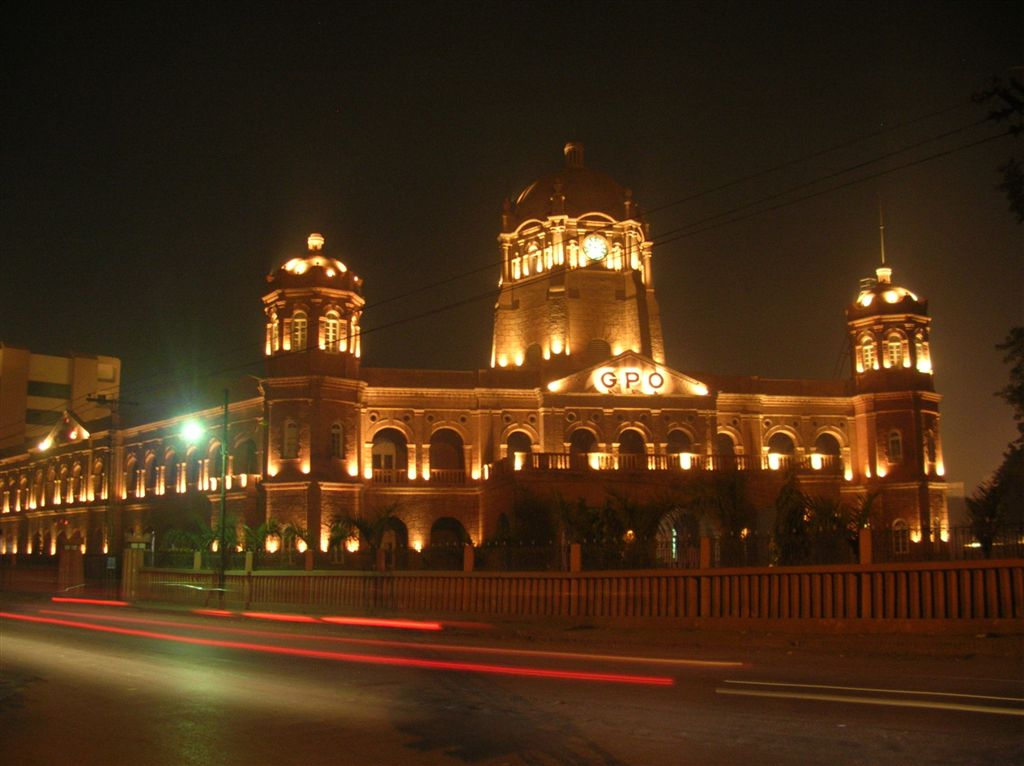
General Post Office, Lahore

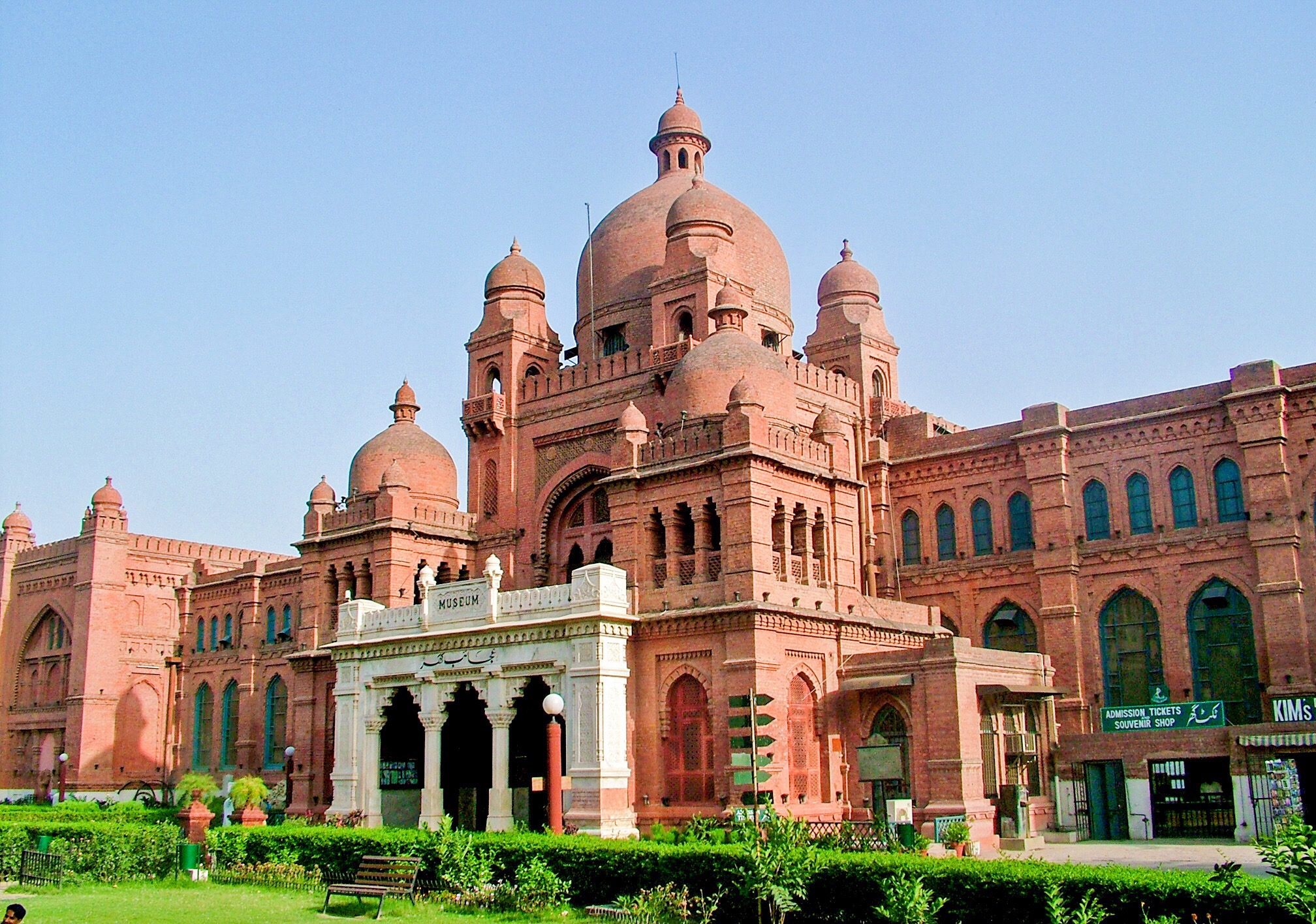
Lahore Museum

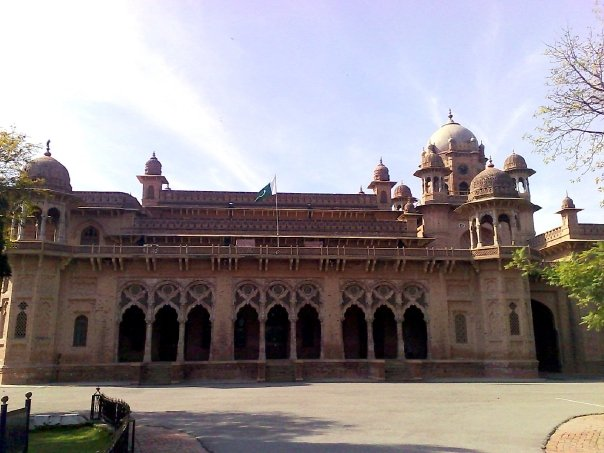
Aitchison College

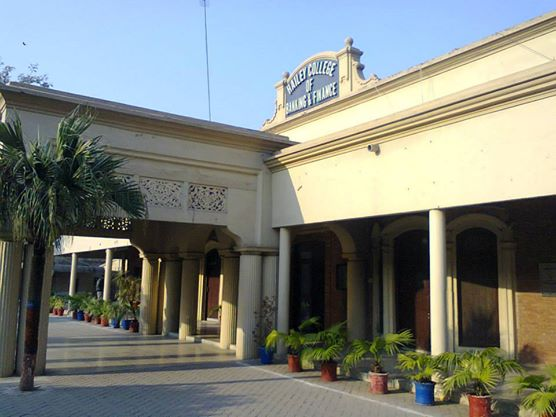
Hailey College of Banking & Finance

== Named after Ram ==
=== Institutes ===
- Sir Ganga Ram Hospital (India)
- Sir Ganga Ram Hospital (Pakistan)

=== Places ===
- Gangapur, Punjab, Pakistan

=== Hostel ===
Ganga Bhawan, PG/PhD hostel at IIT Roorkee
