= Khalid Masud Gondal =

Peon from Pakistan

Khalid Masood Gondal
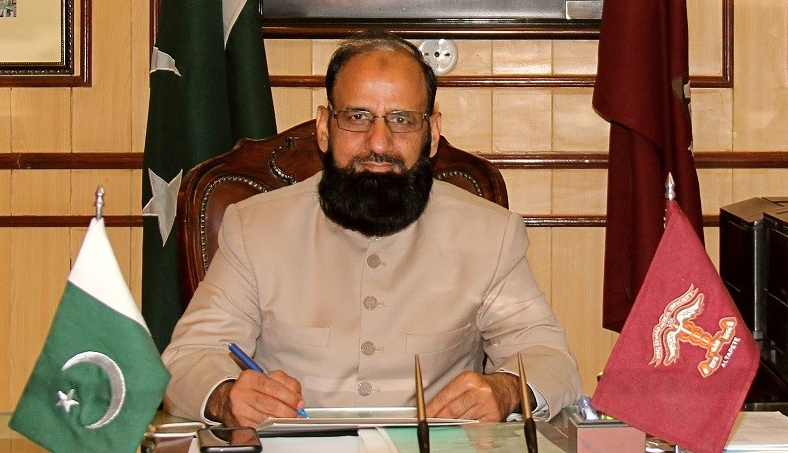
- Born: 17 April 1962 (age 64); Wara Alam Shah, Mandi Bahauddin, Pakistan
- Education: King Edward Medical University
- Occupation: General and Laparoscopic Surgeon
- Organization: Fatima Jinnah Medical University
- Known for: Expertise in General and Laparoscopic Surgery
- Awards: Pride of Performance Award in 2021; Tamgha-e-Imtiaz (Medal of Excellence) Award in 2013

Khalid Masud Gondal or Khalid Masood Gondal (Urdu: خالد مسعود گوندل, born 17 April 1962) is the vice-chancellor of Fatima Jinnah Medical University since July 2022 and the President of CPSP since March 2023. He is also the member of PHEC and PMDC. He is a fellow of the Royal College of Physicians and Surgeons of Glasgow, the Royal College of Physicians of Edinburgh, and the American College of Surgeons. He has also served as vice-chancellor of King Edward Medical University, Lahore from June 2018 to June 2022.

== Early life and career ==
Khalid Masood Gondal graduated from King Edward Medical College, Lahore, Pakistan in 1986. Then he completed his fellowship in surgery in 1992. He was appointed as a professor in 2005 and later became Chairman, of the Department of Surgery at his alma mater King Edward Medical University, Lahore. He has published more than 100 research publications in national and international journals. His main interest is in the field of medical education in Pakistan. He served as the first regular Vice Chancellor of Fatima Jinnah Medical University in Lahore. He has also served as the vice president College of Physicians and Surgeons Pakistan (CPSP) in 2011 and senior vice president of CPSP from 2015 to 2016. He was part of the delegation that represented CPSP in many countries including the United States, Canada, UK, Ireland and Saudi Arabia.

== Awards and recognition ==
- Tamgha-e-Imtiaz (Medal of Excellence) Award on 23 March 2023 by the Government of Pakistan for his services in the field of medical education in Pakistan.
- Pride of Performance Award on 23 March 2021 by the President of Pakistan for his services in the field of medical education.
