= Mangtanwala =

- Location within Pakistan
- Coordinates: 31.22°N 73.50°E
- Country: Pakistan
- Province: Punjab
- Elevation: 190 m (620 ft)
- Time zone: UTC+5 (PST)
- Calling code: 39460

Mangtanwala is a town of Nankana Sahib District in the Punjab province of Pakistan. It is located at 31°22'20N 73°50'40E with an altitude of 190 metres (626 feet).

This small town is the birthplace of Ganga Ram, commonly regarded as the "Father of Modern Lahore."
