= Fatima Jinnah Medical University =

Public medical university in Lahore, Pakistan

Coordinates: 31.5550°N 74.3197°E

- جامعہ طبی فاطمہ جناح
- Type: Public university
- Established: March 1948
- Founders: Shujaat Ali
- Affiliations: Higher Education Commission of Pakistan; Sir Ganga Ram Hospital; Pakistan Medical & Dental Council
- Vice-Chancellor: Prof. Khalid Masud Gondal
- Academic staff: 300
- Students: 1500
- Location: Lahore, Punjab, Pakistan
- Colors: Upsdell Red
- Website: www.fjmu.edu.pk

Fatima Jinnah Medical University (Urdu: جامعہ طبی فاطمہ جناح), previously known as Balak Ram Medical College, is a public medical university located in Lahore, Punjab, Pakistan.

Fatima Jinnah Medical University with its associated teaching hospital Sir Ganga Ram Hospital, is a medical institution to teach and train female doctors and post-graduate students and provide medical and healthcare facilities to the citizens of the country, particularly in and around Lahore, and more particularly to the female population. It is now a tertiary healthcare unit and is recognised by the Higher Education Commission of Pakistan.

Sir Ganga Ram Hospital was established in 1921 in the walled city of Lahore by a philanthropist Sir Ganga Ram who also donated a piece of land. The hospital was shifted to its present location in 1943 to cope with the growing demand for medical and health care services.

On 30 June 2015 the Health Department of Pakistan changed the status of the Medical College to the Medical University and the current principal was made the vice chancellor of the university.

== History ==
In 1941, the family of Sir Ganga Ram started a medical college called Balak Ram Medical College after a son of his. Soon after independence in 1947, the college was closed and its premises abandoned. However, the medical professional Professor Shujaat Ali and some colleagues asked the approval of Muhammad Ali Jinnah for the institution to be named after his sister Mohtarma Fatima Jinnah and he agreed. Fatima Jinnah Medical College For Women, Lahore admitted its first batch of 39 students in October 1948 and was formally inaugurated in March 1949 by Khawaja Nazimuddin, then Governor-General of Pakistan.

== Facilities ==
The library of the institution is well equipped with all modern facilities according to the HEC criteria. Library membership is free for all enrolled students. It has a collection of 47,000 volumes comprising text books and reference books on all disciplines of health sciences. Text book service is available in the library. For that purpose a book bank is working for the last 16 years with 5500 books. WHO corner also has been established in library for reference and research. There is a holding list of 27,500 core medical journals present in the library journals section. 37 national and 15 international journals are on its regular list. Nearly 35 videos on different health related topics are available in the library. Almost 130 CDs of medical books are available in the library. A general books section comprising 700 literary books is available for students. Networking of the departments of the university and hospital is being planned with linkages to other national and international universities. There is free Internet facility in the library.

The Audio Visual Department has been provided with new computers and eight multimedia systems for lectures.

The hostel for students consists of seven blocks. There are around one thousand students living in the hostel. There are facilities for outdoor and indoor games, a gymnasium and a swimming pool. The university operates seven buses for the day scholars.

== Ganga Ram Hospital ==
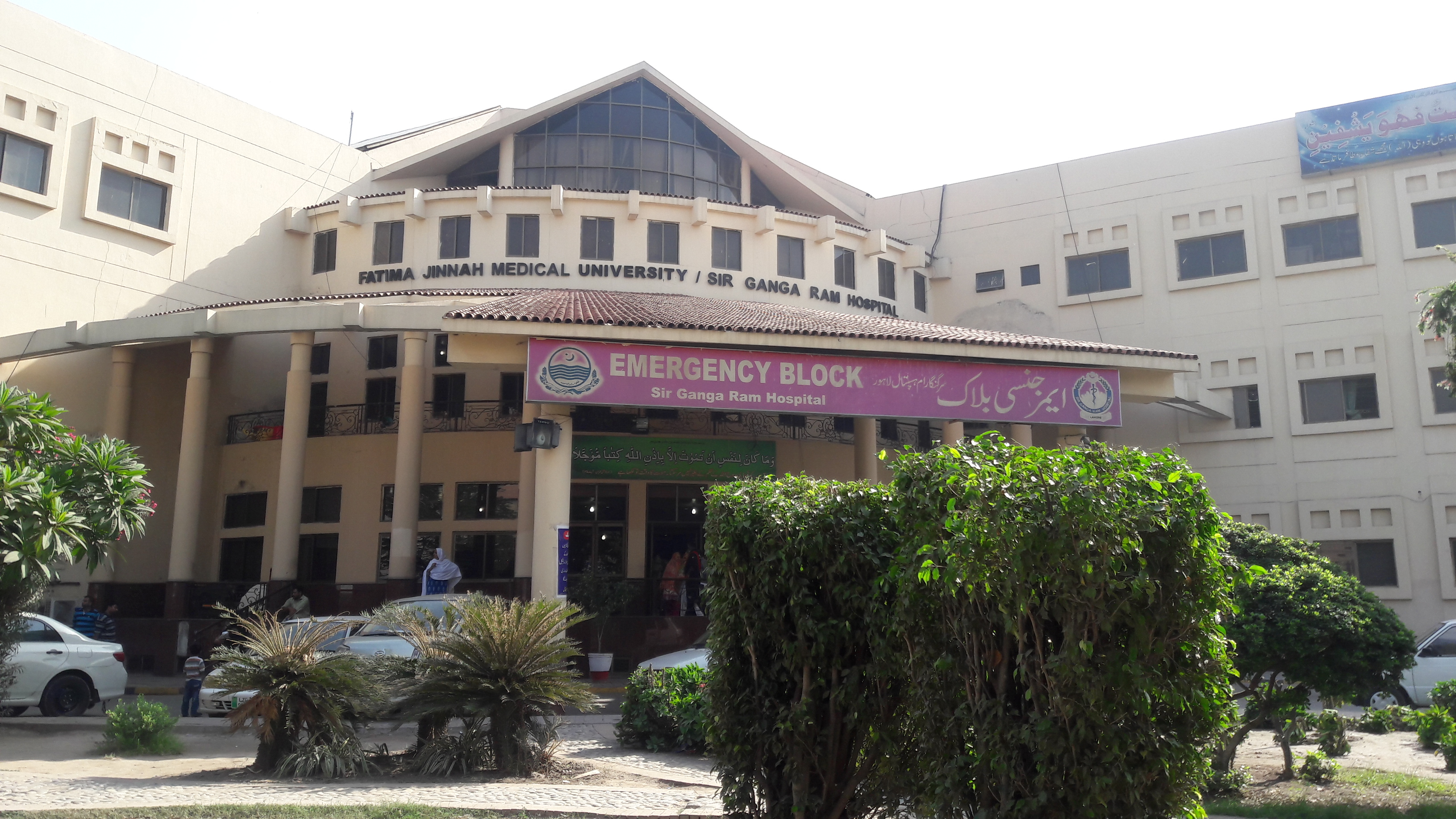
Fatima Jinnah Medical University, Lahore

Sir Ganga Ram Hospital, situated in the heart of city, close to the main artery of Lahore (Shahra-i-Quaid-iAzam) and Punjab Assembly, is the teaching hospital of FJMU. Surrounded by thickly populated area the hospital caters to the western and southern part of the city and provides services to adjacent districts of Lahore. The bed strength of the hospital is 700, but the average number of admissions usually touches 800. The complex covers 314 kanals (about 16 hectares).

== Admissions ==
Fatima Jinnah Medical University admits 250 students every year. 50% of the seats are reserved for the Federal Government and in these seats students from Sindh, Khyber Pakhtunkhwa, Balochistan, Azad Kashmir and Gilgit-Baltistan are admitted. 23 seats are reserved as PTAP (Pakistan Technical Assistance Programme) for the friendly and Islamic countries.

Fatima Jinnah Medical University also conducts JCAT (Joint Centralized Admission Test).

FJMU alumni have a strong presence in North America. The North America wing of FJMU's alumni holds annual meetings and is engaged in projects to help FJMC students, researchers and faculty.

== Notable alumni ==
- Amna Buttar – Pakistani American medical doctor and former member of Provincial Assembly of the Punjab
- Bilquis Nasrum Minallah – Former Pakistani politician who served as Member of the National Assembly of Pakistan from 1985 to 1988
- Yasmin Rashid, former Health Minister of Punjab

== Affiliations ==
The degree is recognised by Pakistan Medical and Dental Council, College of Physicians and Surgeons Pakistan and Higher Education Commission of Pakistan.
