= Lady Aitchison Hospital =

Coordinates: 31°34′N 74°19′E

Geography
- Location: Lahore, Punjab, Punjab, Pakistan

Organisation
- Type: Public
- Affiliated university: King Edward Medical College
- Patron: Government of Punjab, Pakistan

History
- Founded: 15 February 1887

Links
- Website: lah.punjab.gov.pk
- Lists: Hospitals in Pakistan
- Other links: List of hospitals in Lahore

Lady Aitchison Hospital is a maternity hospital located in Lahore, Punjab, Pakistan. It is a teaching hospital of King Edward Medical College.

== History ==
Lady Aitchison Hospital was founded on 15 February 1887 by Lady Beatrice Lyell Aitchison. She was the wife of Charles Umpherston Aitchison, the Lieutenant Governor of the Punjab who himself founded Aitchison College.
