= Punjab Social Security Hospital =

Hospital in Lahore, Pakistan

Geography
- Location: Lahore, Pakistan
- Coordinates: 31.497387°N 74.262361°E

Organisation
- Type: Public hospital
- Affiliated university: College of Physicians and Surgeons Pakistan

Services
- Beds: 610

Links
- Website: www.pessi.gop.pk/nsssh.php
- Lists: Hospitals in Pakistan
- Other links: List of hospitals in Lahore

The Punjab Social Security Hospital is a 610-bed teaching hospital in Lahore, Pakistan

It is situated on Multan Road, in south western part of Lahore. This hospital mainly provides free care for employees and families of industrial units in Punjab. It was built and is run by a public sector department PESSI (Punjab Employees Social Security Institution).

== Hospitals ==
- Social Security Hospital Multan Road Lahore
- Maternity and New Born Childcare Hospital Faisalabad
- Social Security Hospital Shandara
- Social Security Hospital Sheikhupura
- Social Security Hospital Gujranwala
- Social Security Hospital Sialkot
- Social Security Hospital Okara
- Social Security Hospital Islamabad
- Social Security Hospital Gujrat
- Social Security Hospital Kot Lakhpat
- Social Security Hospital Jauharabad
- Social Security Hospital Jarranwala
- Khawaja Fareed Social Security Hospital (KFSSH) Multan
- Social Security Hospital Faisalabad
- Social Security Hospital Sahiwal
- Social Security Hospital Jhang

== Accredited hospital ==
This hospital is accredited by the College of Physicians and Surgeons Pakistan.
