= Gulab Devi Postgraduate Medical Institute =

Coordinates: 31.48124°N 74.34224°E

Gulab Devi Postgraduate Medical Institute (abbreviated as only GPMI), established in 2004, is a postgraduate training institute for medical and health care professionals located in Lahore, Punjab, Pakistan. Gulab Devi Chest Hospital is attached to it as a training and teaching hospital.

The institute is accredited for training in FCPS Cardiology by the College of Physicians and Surgeons of Pakistan. PGMI is also affiliated with University of Health Sciences and constitutes Ameer-ud-Din Medical College.
