= Sir Ganga Ram Hospital (India) =

For-profit hospital in Delhi

Coordinates: 28.63°N 77.18°E

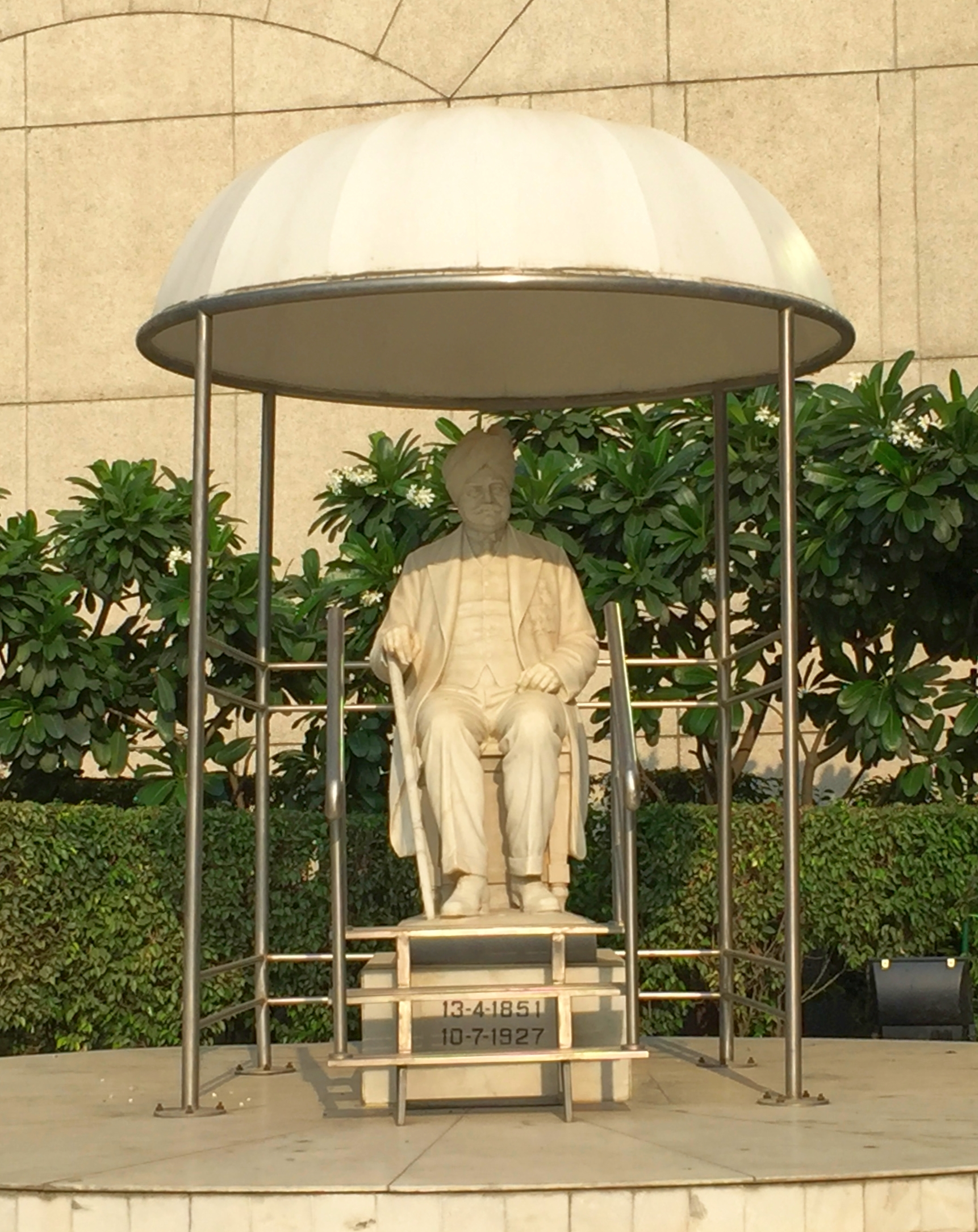
- Statue of the benefactor, Sir Ganga Ram at the hospital.

Geography
- Location: Delhi, India

Organisation
- Care system: Private hospital
- Type: General

Services
- Standards: NABH
- Emergency department: Yes (Trauma center)
- Beds: 900+

History
- Founded: 1954

The Sir Ganga Ram Hospital is a for-profit private hospital in Rajendra Nagar, Delhi. It provides comprehensive medical services to patients from all over Southeast Asia. The hospital's Minimal Access Surgery department was the first such department in South Asia.

The Sir Ganga Ram Hospital also provides training to young doctors under the Diplomate in National Board (DNB) program. The DNB program at the hospital was started in 1984 and currently runs the largest number of DNB specialties in the country. It has the distinction of having the first bone bank in India.

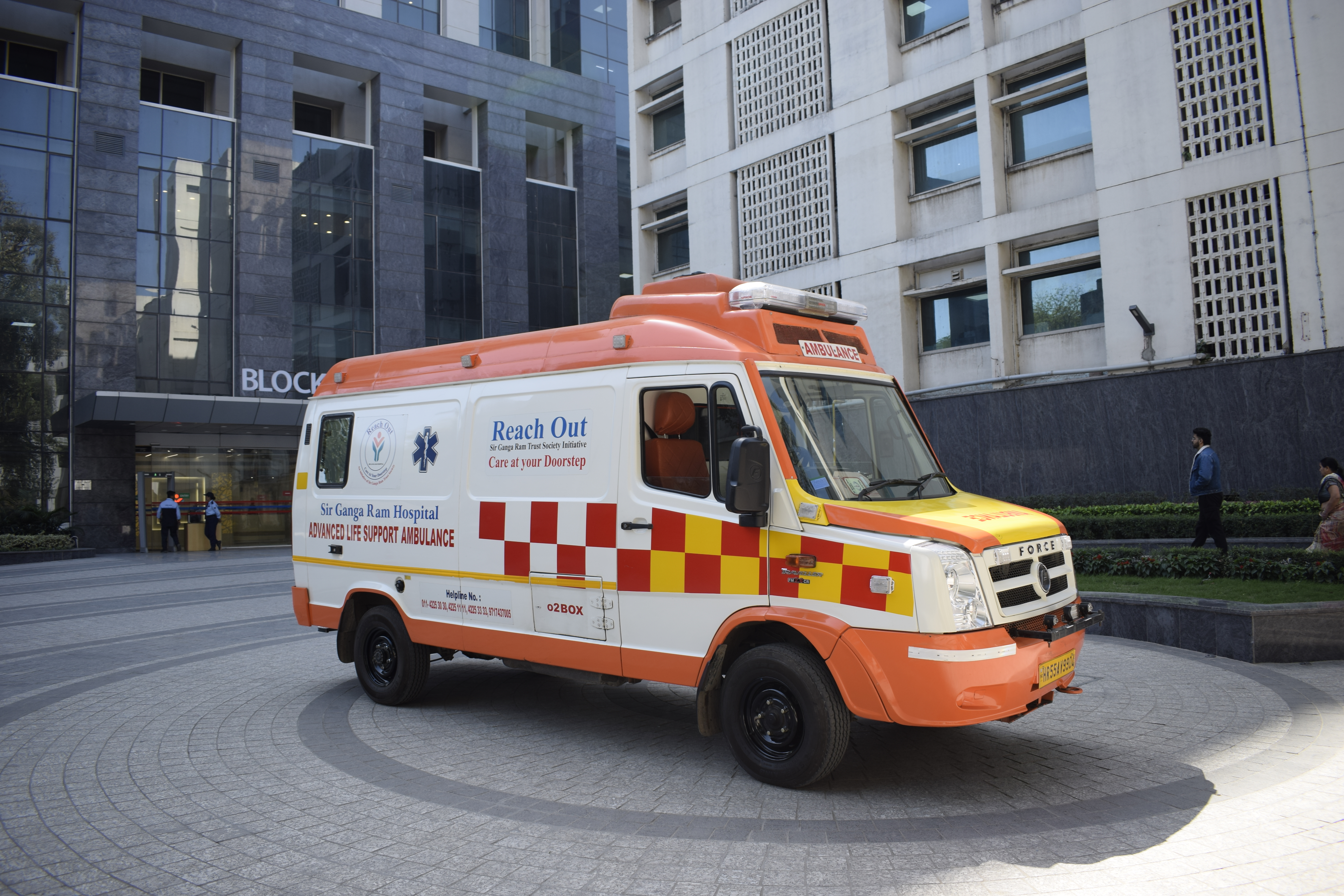
Sir Ganga Ram Hospital Ambulance

On 29 March 2019, the Sir Ganga Ram Hospital became the first large hospital in Delhi to join AB-PMJAY.

Currently, Sir Ganga Ram Hospital is led by Dr. (Prof.) D.S. Rana, who serves as Chairman, Sir Ganga Ram Trust Society, and Dr Ajay Swaroop, Chairman Board of Management.

== History ==
The original hospital was first founded in 1921 at Lahore, British India (now Pakistan) by Sir Ganga Ram (1851–1927), a civil engineer and leading philanthropist of his times. Following WWII and after the Partition of India in 1947, this second hospital was established in Central Delhi on a plot of land approximately 11 acres. The foundation was laid in April 1951 by the then Prime Minister of India Shri Jawahar Lal Nehru under the auspices of Dharma Vira, who at the time was also Principal Private Secretary to the Prime Minister. The hospital was later inaugurated by him on 13 April 1954. Dharma Vira, son in law of Sir Gangaram is also known as the Chief Architect and Founder of the Sir Gangaram Hospital in Delhi.

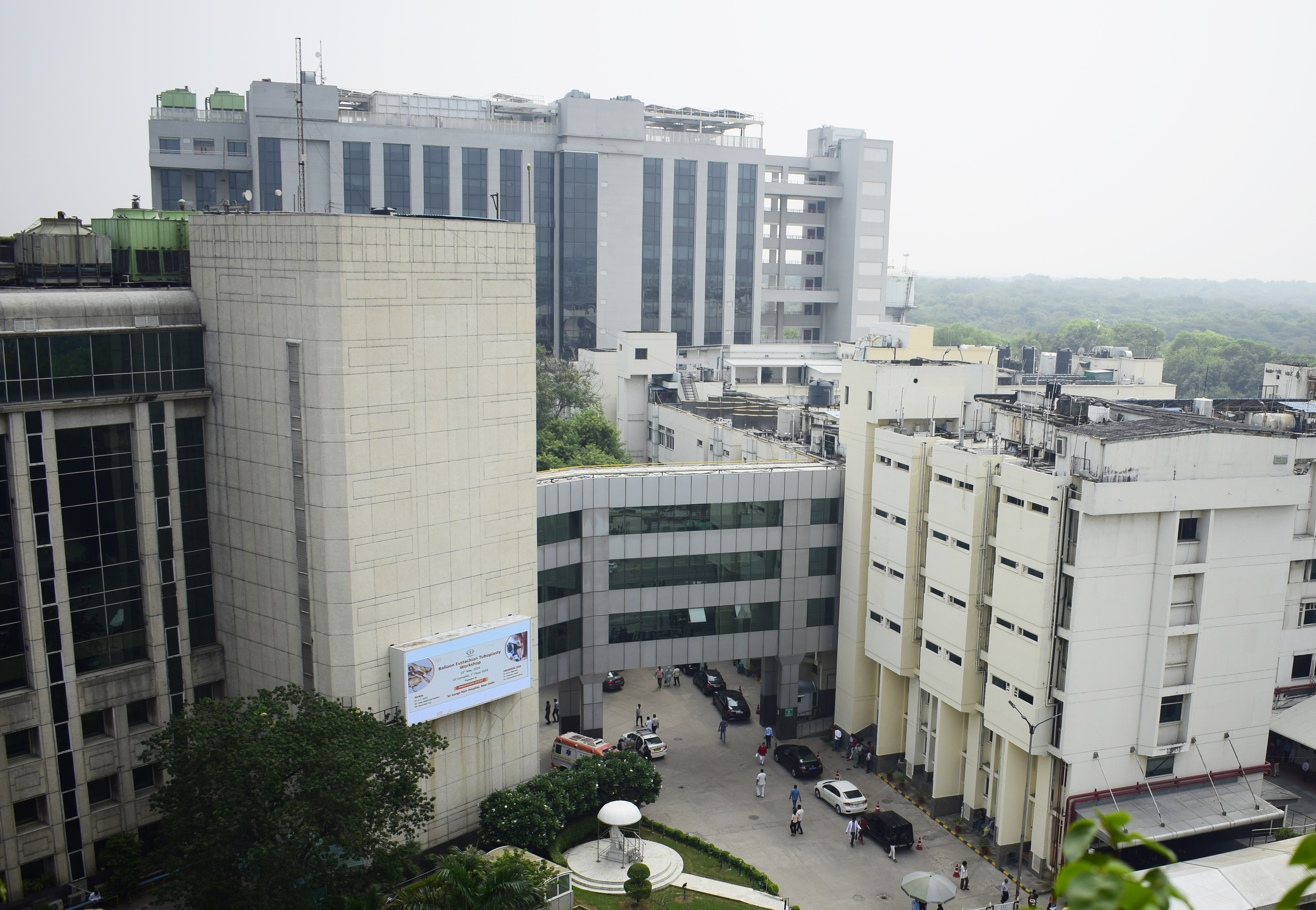
Sir Ganga Ram Hospital

The hospital nearly closed due to lack of funds in the 1970s. It was restructured by Dr. K.C. Mahajan, one of Delhi's notable general surgeons, in 1981. As chairman of the Board of Management, Dr. Mahajan revised the financial and functional structure of the hospital and opened the Mahajan Imaging Diagnostics Centre inside the premises of the Sir Ganga Ram Hospital. The lessons learned in the 1970s changed the hospital focus from being service oriented to being profitable with a high quality canteen service.

Dr.S.K.Bhandari established the gynaecology and obstetrics Department at Sir Ganga Ram Hospital and worked for 58 years before succumbing to heart failure and COVID-19 at the age of 86 years. Dr.Bhandari is said to have delivered several prominent personalities including Congress leaders Rahul Gandhi and Priyanka Gandhi and her children.
