= Wara Alam Shah =

Coordinates: 32°30′30″N 73°16′50″E

Wara Alam Shah واڑہ عالم شاہ
- Village and union council
- Interactive map of Wara Alam Shah
- Country: Pakistan
- Region: Punjab
- District: Mandi Bahauddin District
- Tehsil: Malakwal
- Time zone: UTC+5 (PST)
- Postal code: 50531
- Website: Wara Alam Shah

Wara Alam Shah (Urdu: واڑہ عالم شاہ) is a village and union council (administrative subdivision) of Mandi Bahauddin District in the Punjab province of Pakistan. Amjad Alam Khan founded Wara Alam Shah. The history of this village is known from an elder that this village came into existence about four hundred years ago. It is located at 32°30'30N 73°16'50E.
