= College of Statistical and Actuarial Sciences =

College of the University of the Punjab

College of Statistical Sciences
- Former name: Department of Statistics (1950-1952) Institute of Statistics (1952-2007)
- Established: 1950
- Parent institution: University of the Punjab
- Principal: Dr. Sohail Chand
- Location: Lahore, Punjab, Pakistan

College of Statistical Sciences is a constituent college of the University of the Punjab in Lahore.

== History ==
The subject of Statistics was introduced in 1941 in the University. The college was established as the Department of Statistics in 1950 by Dr. M. Zia ud Din. The department was raised to the status of an Institute in 1952 and renamed to its current name in 2007.
