= Doctors Hospital, Lahore =

Pakistani hospital

Doctors Hospital and Medical Center

Geography
- Location: Lahore, Punjab, Pakistan

Organisation
- Type: Private hospital
- Affiliated university: Lahore Medical and Dental College

Services
- Beds: 250

Links
- Website: www.doctorshospital.com.pk

Doctors Hospital and Medical Center is a 250-bed private, for-profit hospital located in Lahore, Punjab, Pakistan. It is attached to Lahore Medical and Dental College as a teaching hospital.

== History ==
In 1996, a small group of Pakistani doctors practicing in the United States held a retreat in Pennsylvania to discuss the creation of a new medical facility in Pakistan. These doctors moved back to Pakistan and started to build the Doctors' Hospital and Medical Center. Many colleagues from different specialties joined the core group, and the hospital was established in 2000.

== Incident ==
In 2015, the Pakistan Medical and Dental Council (PMDC) held Doctors Hospital responsible for the death of three-year-old Imanae Malik six years earlier. Despite being found guilty of negligence, the PMDC fined the hospital only Rs 100,000 "for being responsible for this sad incident which could have been avoided if the hospital management was vigilant in its administration”.

== Research Center ==
The new department of research are working to research on diabetes and cancer in collaboration with shaukat khanum hospital.

== Departments ==
Doctors Hospital and Medical Center has following departments.

- Cancer Center
- Cardiac Surgery
- Cardiology
- Clinical Nutrition
- Dermatology
- Diabetes and Endocrinology
- Emergency Care
- Ear, Nose and Throat
- Gastroenterology
- General Surgery
- Hematology and Oncology
- Hepato – Pancreatico – Billary and Liver Transplant Surgery
- Internal Medicine
- Kidney Transplantation
- Microbiology
- Nephrology and Dialysis
- Neurology
- Nuclear Medicine
- Obstetrics and Gynecology
- Ophthalmology
- Oral and Maxillofacial Surgery
- Orthopaedic Surgery
- Pathology
- Pediatric Oncology
- Pediatrics
- Physical Therapy
- Plastic Surgery
- Psychiatry
- Pulmonology
- Radiology
- Speech Therapist
- Surgical Oncology
- Urology
- Vascular Surgery
