= Lahore University of Biological & Applied Sciences =

Medical university in Lahore, Pakistan

- Type: Private
- Established: 1997
- Location: Lahore, Punjab, Pakistan
- Campus: Urban
- Colors: Green and white
- Mascot: Lamcians
- Website: ubas.edu.pk

Lahore University of Biological & Applied Sciences (LUBAS) is a private university located in Tulspura, Lahore, Punjab, Pakistan. It is part of Punjab Group of Colleges.

Lahore University of Biological & Applied Sciences was founded in 1997. It is registered with and accredited by Pakistan Medical and Dental Council and affiliated with University of Health Sciences, Lahore (UHS).

Doctors Hospital, Surgimed Hospital and Ghurki Trust Teaching Hospital are attached as training and teaching hospitals.

== Associated colleges ==
- Lahore Medical College
- Lahore Dental College
- Lahore Pharmacy College (LPC)
- Lahore College of Physiotherapy (LCPT)
- Ruth Pfau College of Nutritional Sciences
- Ruth Pfau College of Biotechnology
- Doctor hospital college of nursing (DHCON)
