= Hailey College of Banking and Finance =

Hailey College of Banking and Finance, Lahore
- Type: Public University
- Established: 26 March 2003
- Accreditation: HEC Pakistan
- Affiliations: University of the Punjab
- Chancellor: Governor of Punjab, Pakistan (Currently Sardar Saleem Haider Khan)
- Vice-Chancellor: Prof. Dr. Khalid Mahmood
- Principal: Dr. Ahmed Muneeb Mehta
- Location: Lahore, Punjab, Pakistan
- Website: www.puhcbf.edu.pk

Hailey College of Banking and Finance is a business school has an affiliation with University of the Punjab in Lahore, Pakistan.

== History ==
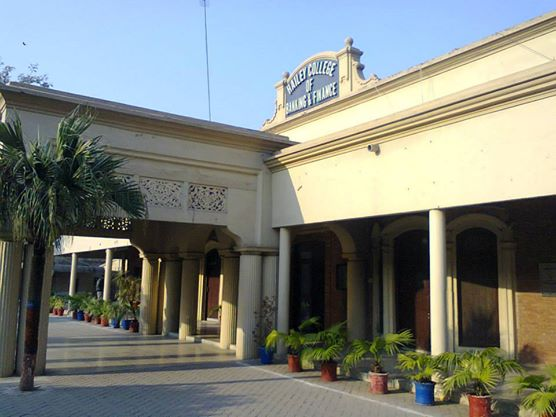
Hailey College of Banking and Finance

Hailey College was emerged on 23 March 2003 by Khalid Maqbool. Hailey College of Banking and Finance has been established as the 5th Constituent College of the University of the Punjab, Lahore. College was inaugurated by Lt. Gen. (R) Khalid Maqbool (formerly Chancellor and Governor Punjab) on 26 March 2003. It is established in renovated old premises of Hailey College of Commerce which was shifted to Quaid-i-Azam (New) Campus, University of the Punjab in 1978. The Building was donated by Sir Ganga Ram.

The college is planning to start Certifications, Diplomas and Short Terms Courses to cater the need of the Trade, Commerce and Industry. Efforts are being made to develop entrepreneurship in the students so that they can undertake their own business work. Hailey college of banking and finance is more focusing on making entrepreneur rather than UN skill labour.

== Programs ==
It provides following programs.

- Bachelor of Business Administration
- Master of Business Administration
