= Punjab Institute of Mental Health =

Psychiatric facility in Lahore, Pakistan

Coordinates: 31.53583°N 74.33545°E

Punjab Institute of Mental Health is an institute situated in Lahore, Pakistan. It is the largest psychiatric facility in South Asia.

== History ==
Johann Martin Honigberger was a Hungarian doctor who served as the personal physician to Maharaja Ranjit Singh from 1812 until the Maharaja's death in 1839. He set up the first psychiatric ward just behind the gunpowder factory and started treating more patients after the Maharaja's death. He left for Europe when the East India Company annexed Punjab in 1849. Judicial Commissioner Robert Montgomery took control and decided to build a larger, more secluded facility.

The Lahore Mental Hospital was built in 1900 on 69.6 ha (172 acres) of land.
