= Ameer-ud-Din Medical College =

Medical college in Punjab, Pakistan

- امیرالدین طبی درس گاہ
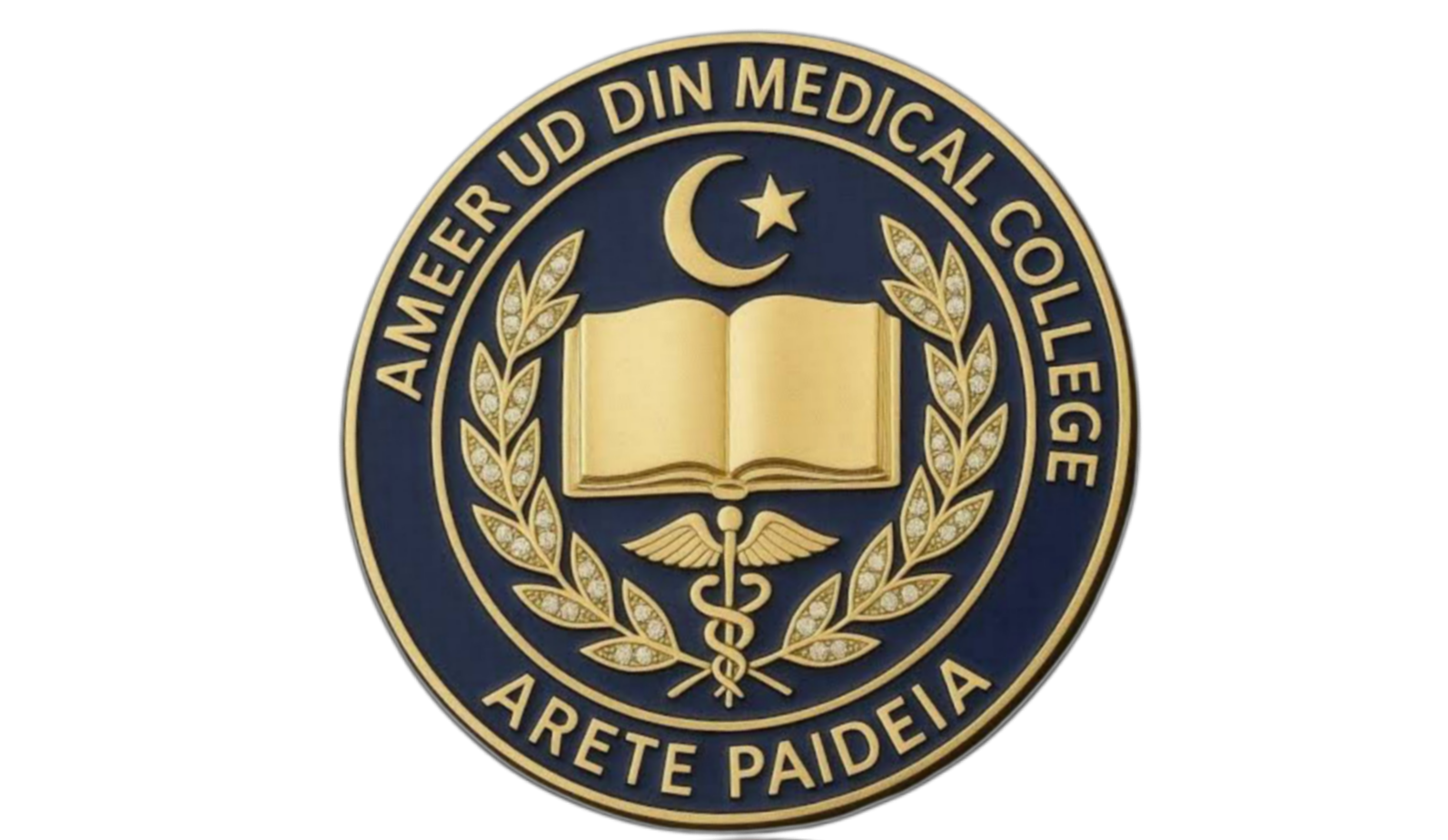
- Official Seal of AMC
- Other name: AMC
- Motto: Arete Paideia
- Motto in English: Excellence through Education
- Type: Public Medical school
- Established: 2011
- Parent institution: University of Health Sciences, Lahore
- Accreditation: Pakistan Medical and Dental Council; Pakistan Nursing Council
- Academic affiliations: Post Graduate Medical Institute,Punjab Institute of Neurosciences (PINS)Lahore
- Principal: Jodat Saleem
- Location: 6-Birdwood Road Jinnah Town, Lahore, Punjab, Pakistan; 31°32′43″N 74°19′22″E
- Campus: Urban, 2.68 acres (1.08 ha)
- Language: English
- Magazine: AMLIT
- Colors
- Nickname: Ameerians
- Website: www.pgmipunjab.edu.pk

Ameer-ud-Din Medical College (Urdu: امیرالدین طبی درس گاہ) (abbreviated as AMC; also known as PGMI), established in 2011, is one of the six public colleges of medicine located in, Lahore, Punjab, Pakistan. Lahore General Hospital is attached as a training and teaching hospital. The college is named after Ameer-ud-din, a surgeon and teacher.

It was established on the initiative of CM Shehbaz Sharif to give quality education in the region of Punjab and especially in Lahore. It is registered with PMDC, listed in IMED, affiliated with UHS, and approved by the Ministry of Health.

== History ==
Ameer-ud-Din Medical College (abbreviated as AMC; also known as PGMI), established in 2011, is one of the five public colleges of medicine located in, Lahore. It is registered with PMDC, listed in IMED, affiliated with PGMI and UHS, and approved by the Ministry of Health. Lahore General Hospital is attached as a training and teaching hospital. Dr. Ameer served as senior professor of surgery at Mayo Hospital at the time of partition. He rendered glorious services for the treatment of those who got injured at the hands of Sikhs and Hindus during migration. The secret of his success as a medical educationist lay in the fact that he practiced in his life what he preached in his lectures to his students. Prof. Ameer-ud-Din was punctual and produced health professionals who headed various eminent institutions in Punjab and other provinces. He used to extend his helping hands towards the needy impecunious patients and educational scholarships to deserving students. Prof. Ameer sold his personal capacious house situated in the most expensive area of the city Gulberg and donated all the money got from purchasing his house to the development of the Paediatric Surgery Ward of Mayo Hospital Lahore. Considering his unprecedented contribution towards a medical education and his arduous services for ailing humanity, the Academic Council of PGMI/AMC decided to honor him by giving his name to this newly established medical college. The fifth badge of 114 students is inducted every year. University of Health Sciences (UHS) processes the Admission procedure. The first batch of Ameer-ud-Din Medical College bagged first position in the Punjab Province which is a tribute to Dr. Ameer in some way. May his soul rest in eternal peace.

== Academic Programs ==
- Bachelor of medicine and Bachelor of surgery (MBBS)— a five year undergraduate programme.

== Departments ==
- Basic science departments
  - Anatomy
  - Biochemistry
  - Community medicine
  - Forensic medicine
  - Pathology
  - Pharmacology
  - Physiology
- Medicine and allied departments
  - Cardiology
  - Dermatology
  - Endocrinology & Metabolism
  - General medicine
  - Neurology
  - Pediatrics
  - Preventive medicine
  - Psychiatry
  - Pulmonology (Chest medicine)
  - Radiotherapy
  - Urology
- Surgery and allied departments
  - Anesthesiology
  - Cardiac surgery
  - Cosmetic surgery
  - General surgery
  - Neurosurgery
  - Obstetrics and gynaecology
  - Ophthalmology
  - Oral and maxillofacial surgery
  - Orthopedics
  - Otorhinolaryngology
  - Pediatric surgery
  - Radiology
- Administrative departments
  - IT Department
