= Sir Ganga Ram Hospital, Lahore =

Hospital in Lahore, Pakistan

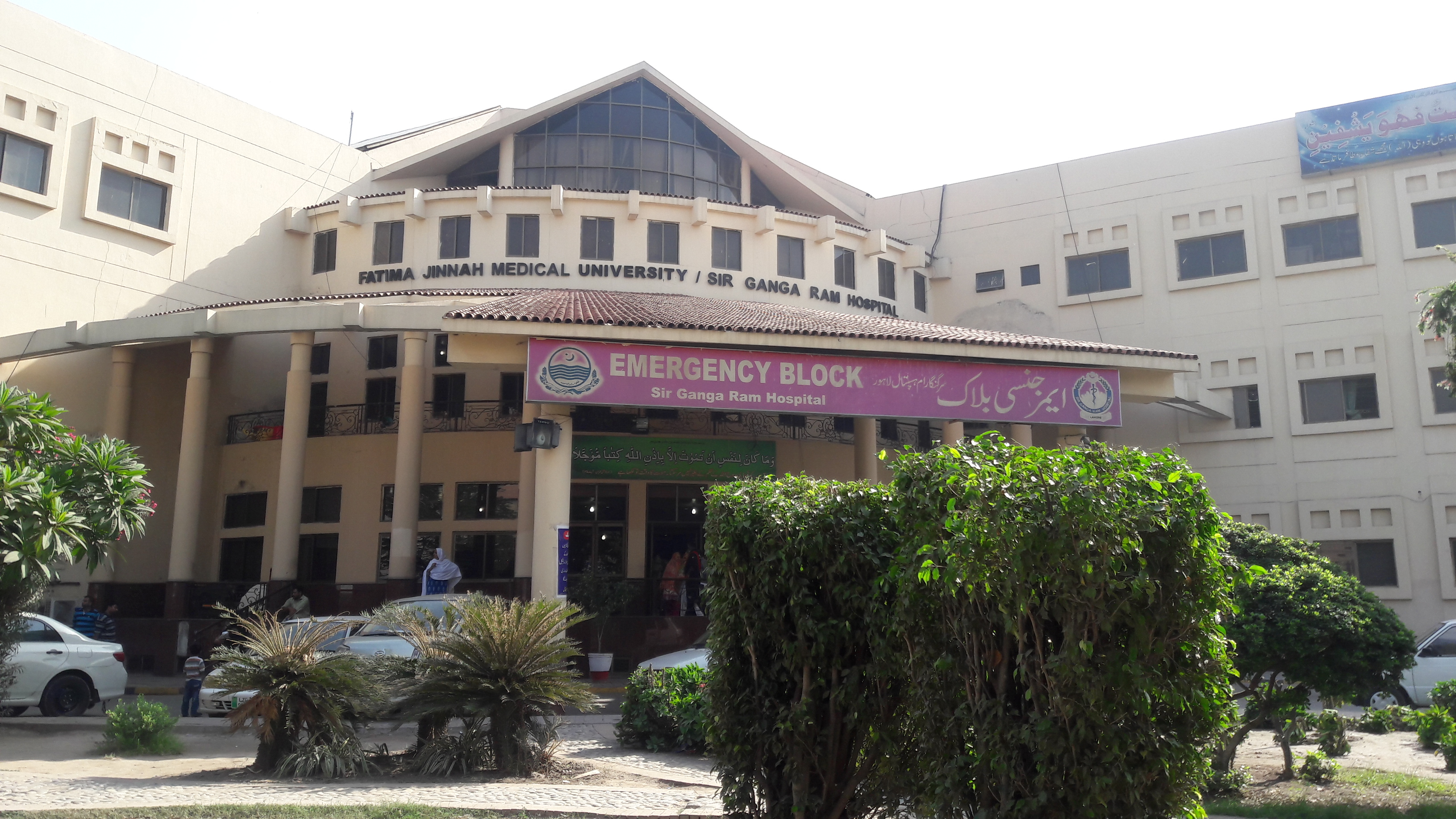
- Sir Ganga Ram Hospital, Lahore

Geography
- Location: Lahore, Punjab, Pakistan, Pakistan
- Coordinates: 31.554419°N 74.320673°E

Organisation
- Care system: Public Sector hospital
- Type: Teaching
- Affiliated university: Fatima Jinnah Medical University

Services
- Emergency department: Yes
- Beds: 831

History
- Founded: 1921

Links
- Lists: Hospitals in Pakistan

Sir Ganga Ram Hospital (Urdu: سر گنگا رام ہسپتال) is a 550-bed hospital in Lahore, Pakistan. This was the original hospital established by Sir Ganga Ram, a Civil Engineer who served the British government. He established the hospital in Lahore in 1921, during the British Raj.

== History ==
Sir Ganga Ram Hospital was established in 1921, at the end of WWI in the walled city of Lahore. The benefactor, Sir Ganga Ram, was a civil engineer and leading philanthropist of his time who also donated land for the site. In 1943 during WWII, the hospital was shifted to its present location to cope with the growing demand for medical and health care services. After the partition in 1947, India built another "Sir Ganga Ram Hospital" in New Delhi.

== Associated medical college ==
In 1944, the family of Sir Ganga Ram started a medical college by the name Balak Ram Medical College named after a son of Sir Ganga Ram. The college was closed soon after the independence of Pakistan in 1947 and its premises were abandoned. Fatima Jinnah Medical University was established in 1948 on the same land and named after Fatima Jinnah, the sister of Muhammad Ali Jinnah.

Sir Ganga Ram Hospital is now an affiliated hospital of Fatima Jinnah Medical University. It is now being extended over another 11,128.9 m^{2} (119,790 sq ft) of land and will provide an additional 400 beds. Although it is an all-female medical college, the faculty consists of highly qualified male and female teachers. The college has well-equipped laboratories, an air-conditioned dissection hall, lecture theatres with audio-visual aids for teaching purposes, a pathology museum, clinical academic rooms, a well-equipped library, and an auditorium for seminars and international conferences. A purpose-built accident and emergency department has been added.

The hostel for students is within walking distance of the college. It consists of six blocks. Two new blocks are being built to accommodate more students. At the moment there are around one thousand students living in the hostel.

== Recognition ==
- Accredited by College of Physicians and Surgeons of Pakistan.

== In literature ==
A marble statue of Sir Ganga Ram once stood in a public square on Mall Road in Lahore. Famous Urdu writer Saadat Hasan Manto (known for his satire "Toba Tek Singh") wrote a satire about persons who were trying to obliterate any memory of Hindu in Lahore after Pakistan came into existence. In his story "Garland", based on a true incident during the religious riots of 1947, an inflamed mob in Lahore, after attacking a residential area, turned to attack the statue of Sir Ganga Ram, a Hindu philanthropist of Lahore. They first pelted the statue with stones, then smothered its face with coal tar. A man then made a garland of old shoes and climbed up to put it around the statue's neck. The police arrived and opened fire. Among the injured was the man with the garland of old shoes. As he fell, the mob shouted, "Let us rush him to Sir Ganga Ram Hospital," forgetting that they were trying to obliterate the memory of the very person who had founded the hospital to which they now wanted to take him to save his life.
