= Hailey College of Commerce =

Business college in Lahore, Pakistan

- Type: Public (undergraduate and graduate)
- Established: 4 March 1927
- Affiliation: University of the Punjab
- Principal: Hafiz Zafar Ahmad
- Students: 3300
- Location: Lahore, Punjab, Pakistan; 31°34′N 74°18′E
- Campus: Two main blocks : Nazir Block and Anis Block
- Website: www.hcc.edu.pk

Hailey College of Commerce is a constituent undergraduate and postgraduate college of the University of the Punjab in Lahore, Punjab, Pakistan.

Established on 4 March 1927, it is the oldest specialized institution of commerce in Asia. It was first situated on the university's old campus and was relocated to its new campus in 1981. The college serves approximately 3000 students with a permanent faculty of 37.

== Historical background ==
University of the Punjab came into existence on 14 October 1882 and the Faculty of Commerce was established during the session 1919–1920. In 1922, the Faculty of Commerce recommend to start a bachelor's degree in Commerce instead of the diploma offered at that time. This idea was further strengthened with the establishment of Northern India Chamber of Commerce in 1923 at Lahore. However, the plan was deferred for three years due to financial constraints. This problem was overcome by the generous offer of Sir Ganga Ram to donate his residential building "Nabha House" opposite the University Grounds for exclusive use to establish a College of Commerce. The Government of Punjab in return agreed to provide a recurring grant of Rs. 42,000 to meet the annual expenditure on the staff and establishment and a nonrecurring grant of Rs. 10,000 for furniture and other expenditures. All these offers were accepted and approved and Hailey College was established on 4 March 1927, named after the then Governor of Punjab and the Chancellor of the University Sir William Malcolm Hailey. Three years B. Corn. Degree Course was introduced at that time. The primary aim of the college was to impart sound and high-class education and training in the field of Commerce.

Sir Ganga Ram donated the "Nabha House" and the old hostel building for the establishment of the college in 1927. Later on, University of the Punjab added a Hall, four classrooms, a second hostel and other offices. But with the gradual increase in the number of students, these premises were considered insufficient to meet the college requirements. The idea to shift the college to New Campus greatly developed during its Golden Jubilee Celebration in 1977 and it was shifted to the o New Campus on 23 September 1978 and temporarily housed in Hostel No. 15. The present premises were inaugurated on 1 January 1981. Later, the first floor and a separate Cafeteria were added during the next two years. The Library was built a structure of 6048 square feet and all its books were shifted from the City Campus to the new building in July 1985. A beautiful Table Tennis Court was donated by M/S Sends Industries Limited in 1987 and the college has also constructed Squash Racket Courts. There is a plan of adding a multipurpose hall in the near future.

Presently, the college is spread over a vast area in beautiful lush green surroundings with the Canal on one side and University Law College on the other. It has also the privilege of having the main mosque in its vicinity.
