= Dow University of Health Sciences =

Public medical university in Karachi, Pakistan

- Other name: DUHS
- Motto in English: Prevention Is Better than Cure.
- Type: Public
- Established: 1945
- Accreditation: HEC, PMDC, CPSP
- Chancellor: Kamran Tessori (Governor of Sindh)
- Registrar: Ashar Afaq
- Location: Karachi, Sindh, Pakistan
- Campus: Urban
Colours
- Website: www.duhs.edu.pk

The Dow University of Health Sciences (DUHS) is a public medical university located in Karachi, Sindh, Pakistan. It was established as Dow Medical College during the British Raj in 1945 and is named after the British governor of Sindh at the time Sir Hugh Dow.

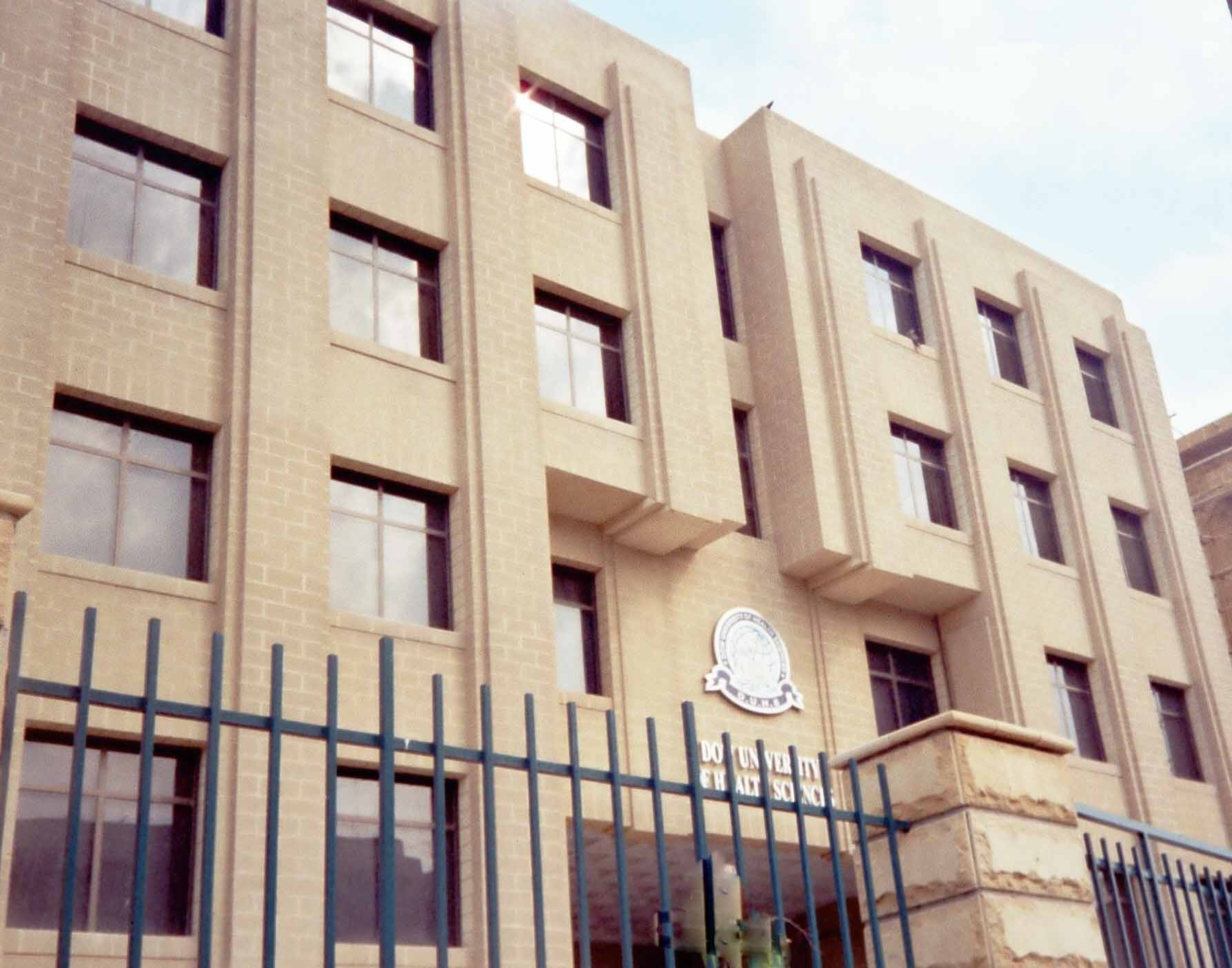
Dow University of Health Sciences

It is known for its strong emphasis on economics biomedical, health, and medical research programmes. It is ranked among the top medical schools by HEC in 2014. It also ranked latest by QS World University Rankings as among 600 best universities globally in the field of medicine.

== History ==
Sir Hugh Dow laid the foundation stone of Dow Medical College, Karachi, on 10 December 1945, at the site of old NJV School. Three weeks later, on 31 December 1945, the college consisting of forty-five students, including one female Muslim student, transferred from Hyderabad to Karachi. The Government of Sindh under the lead of then Health minister Dr. Hemandas Wadhwani, arranged this transfer. The 20 member teaching faculty was led by Dr Kewalram Tarasing Ramchandani as the Principal. Some staff taught multiple subjects. It was initially housed in the old NJV High School Building on Mission Road. The new building was inaugurated in November 1946. Until 1947, it was an affiliate of University of Mumbai. After the Pakistan's independence, it was under the University of Sindh. After the University of Karachi was founded, it became its affiliate. It was in 2003 when the Dow University of Health Sciences was established as an independent institution, with Dow Medical College and two other colleges being put under its umbrella.

== Affiliated Hospital ==
The university also has Civil Hospital Karachi as an affiliated hospital.

== Affiliated colleges ==
- Dow Medical College
- Dow International Medical College
- Dow Dental College
- Dow International Dental College
- Dow College of Pharmacy
- Dow College of Biotechnology

== Academics ==
The institution offers undergraduate, post-graduate, doctorate diplomas and certificate courses in almost all academic disciplines relating to medical sciences.

=== Undergraduate programs ===
Dow Institute of Medical Technology offers Bachelor's programs 16 undergraduate degrees in four disciplines: Clinical Pathology Technology, Surgical Technology, Respiratory and Critical Care Technology and Ophthalmology.

- Bachelor of Medicine and Bachelor of Surgery
- Bachelors In Dental Surgery
- Doctor of Pharmacy
- BS Generic Nursing, Post RN Nursing
- Doctor of Physiotherapy
- BS Occupation Theory
- BS Prosthetics & Orthotics
- BS In Dental Care Professional (dental hygiene, dental technology)
- BS Medical Technology
- Specialties of DIMT
- Bachelors of Business Administration
- BS Nutrition Sciences
- BS Biotechnology

=== Post-graduate programs ===
- Master of Surgery
- M.Phil. Pharmacology
- M.Phil. Pharmaceutics
- M.Phil. Pharmaceutical Chemistry
- M.Phil. Pharmacognosy
- M.Phil. Pharmacy Practice
- Masters of Dental Surgery, Clinical
- Masters of Dental Surgery, Basic
- Masters of Dental Sciences, Clinical
- Masters of Dental Sciences, Basic
- Masters In Public Health
- Masters of Science In Public Health
- Masters of Health Professions' Education
- Masters of science In Nursing
- MS Advanced Physiotherapy
- Masters of Business Administration
- MSc. Diabetes and Endocrinology
- M. Phil program
- Masters of Science in Bio statistics & Epidemiology (MSBE)

==== Doctorate programs ====
- PhD – Basic Medical Sciences
- PhD – Pharmacology
- PhD – Pharmaceutics
- PhD – Pharmacy Practice
- PhD – Pharmaceutical Chemistry
- PhD – Pharmacognosy
- PhD – Public Health Program
- Doctor of Philosophy in Basic Medical Sciences
- Doctor of Philosophy in Clinical Medical Sciences
- Doctor of Philosophy in Public Health
- Doctor of Philosophy in Dental Sciences
- Doctor of Medicine-MD

=== Diploma courses ===
- Diploma In Family Medicine
- Diploma In Medical Jurisprudence
- Diploma In Cardiology
- Diploma In Laryange Otorhinology
- Diploma In Critical Care Medicine
- Diploma In Tuberculosis & Chest Diseases
- Diploma In Child Health
- Diploma In Dermatology
- Diploma In Radiology
- Diploma In Anaesthesiology
- Diploma In Ophthalmology
- Diploma In Psychiatric Medicine
- Diploma in Echocardiography

=== Certificate courses ===
- Certificate Course In Vascular Doppler Ultrasound
- Certificate Course In Color Doppler Ultrasound
- Certificate Course In Non Vascular Doppler Interventional Radiology
- Certificate Course In Neuro Spinal imaging
- Certificate Course In Ultrasonology

== Journals ==
The Journal of the Dow University of Health Science is published 4 monthly by Dow University of Health Sciences. It is recognised by Pakistan Medical and Dental Council and indexed in IMEMR, Pakmedinet and Global Health. It is also available as an online medical journal.

The Journal of Pakistan Medical Students JPMS, the Journal of Pioneering Medical Sciences, an open access, peer-reviewed, online medical journal is a peer-reviewed, international journal from the students of Dow Medical College. It was started by Anis Rehman and Haris Riaz, from Batch of 2011.

== Social service activities ==
Patients' Welfare Association, also known as PWA, is one of the largest and oldest student run volunteer NGO of Pakistan. Students of Dow Medical College have been managing it since 1979. The organization is a blessing for the poor patients coming to Civil Hospital Karachi, helping them through its Blood Bank, Drug Bank, Thalassemia Services, and General and Tuberculosis Follow-Up Clinics. It has been cited in press for its earnest efforts in free patient service

== Research and development ==
Research at Dow University has discovered some variants of human gene, which may provide potency for fighting against Coronavirus disease 2019, as the sequence of virus in Pakistan is somewhat different from the Wuhan virus with few mutations Team of scientists at Karachi has earlier found and identified 9 gene compounds and their efficiency in controlling the growth of epidemic virus. On 13 April, Research team of Dow University disclosed that the DUHS finds a ray of hope in combating COVID-19 epidemic, by suggesting local IVIG from recovered patients holds the potential to control the progress of virus in host (infected). They pointed out that this treatment process involves minimum risk with desired efficacy in recovering from COVID-19.

== International conference on SDGs ==
Office of Research, Innovation, & Commercialization (ORIC) and School of Public Health (SPH), Dow University of Health Sciences (DUHS) hosted a three-day international conference that focused on the sustainable development goals, for population health and wellbeing to achieve the targets by United States. The SDGs covered by DUHS are:

1. Education, gender and inequality
2. Health, well-being and demography
3. Energy decarbonization and sustainable industry
4. Sustainable food, land, water and oceans
5. Sustainable cities and communities
6. Digital revolution for sustainable development

== Notable alumni ==
- Pushpa Kumari Kohli- First Hindu woman to become a police officer in Pakistan.
- Khatu Mal Jeewan, member of National Assembly.
- Shoaib Tauheed, professor and head of physiology
- Basheer Ahmed - physician and American medical academic
- Abdul Bari Khan - Cardiologist, philanthropist and CEO of Indus Hospital and Health Network
- Adeebul Hasan Rizvi – Transplant Urologist, philanthropist and head of Sindh Institute of Urology and Transplantation.
- Sanjay Gangwani - Pakistani Politician
- Musarrat Hussain, director of Jinnah Post Graduate Medical Centre and president of the Pakistan Psychiatrists Society.
- Rafat Hussain – Deputy Head of the School of Rural Medicine at the University of New England, Australia
- Ishrat-ul-Ibad Khan – Governor of Sindh, Pakistan.
- Shabuddin H. Rahimtoola, MBBS, FRCP [Edin], MACP, MACC, D.Sc. (Hon) - Author, Cardiologist at Mayo Clinic best known for his work in valvular heart disease, coronary artery disease, results of cardiac surgery, and arrhythmias along with cardio-myopathy and congenital heart disease.
- Fahad Mirza - Actor and Model
- Azra Raza - Author, Director of Myelodysplastic Syndrome (MDS) Center at Columbia University
- Javed Iqbal Kazi, Dean of medicine- University of Karachi, Sindh Institute of Urology & Transplantation
- Nausheen Hamid - Pakistani politician and social activist, member of the National Assembly of Pakistan
- Tahir Shamsi - Pakistani hematologist and bone marrow pioneer
