= Javed Iqbal Kazi =

Pakistani pathologist (1955–2014)

- Born: 29 May 1955; Karachi, Pakistan
- Died: 17 February 2014 (aged 58); Karachi, Pakistan
- Occupations: Doctor, academician
- Years active: 1995–2014
- Known for: Renal and transplant pathology
- Medical career
- Institutions: Dow Medical College, University of Karachi, National University of Singapore, Addenbrooke's Hospital, University of Cambridge, Royal College of Pathologists, University of Leicester, Sindh Institute of Urology & Transplantation
- Sub-specialties: Histopathology
- Research: Renal and transplant pathology

Javed Iqbal Kazi (Urdu: جاوید اقبال قاضی; 29 May 1955 – 17 February 2014) was a Pakistani pathologist specialized in renal pathology, professor and chairman of Histopathology at Karachi Medical and Dental College, Sindh Institute of Urology & Transplantation, Dr. Ziauddin Hospitals & National Institute of Blood Diseases, and served as Dean of medicine of University of Karachi.

He was also the board member of Journal of Pakistan Medical Association since 2005. He established the department of Histopathology at Sindh Institute of Urology & Transplantation, Karachi, in 1995 and is the pioneer of Renal and Transplant Pathology in Pakistan.

== Early life and career ==
Javed Iqbal Kazi was born on 29 May 1955 in Karachi, Pakistan. He graduated from Dow Medical College in 1980. Kazi served as a lecturer of pathology at Jinnah Sindh Medical University and did his M.Phil. in histopathology from BMSI, JPMC- Jinnah Postgraduate Medical Centre in 1986. He then pursued his Ph.D. in Histopathology from University of Karachi which was a split program whereby he conducted his ph.D. research on Helicobacter pylori at National University of Singapore. During his stay at National University of Singapore, under the mentorship of Professor Rajalingam Sinniah, he learned the techniques of immunohistochemistry and electron microscopy. His research work was published in The Journal of Pathology, UK.

In 1990, Kazi pursued his clinical fellowship in renal pathology at the Addenbrooke's Hospital, University of Cambridge, UK, where the university's clinical school of medicine is based. While at the UK, in 1995, he also acquired his Diplomate from the Royal College of Pathologists, London. After completing his clinical fellowship at Cambridge University, UK, in 1995, Kazi established the department of histopathology and the electron microscopy unit at Sindh Institute of Urology and Transplantation and was the main driving force behind its development. The department is the first set up of transplant pathology and electron microscopy diagnostic facility in Pakistan. He joined Karachi Medical & Dental College as professor of pathology in 1995.

In 1998, Kazi developed an artificial neural network based on Bayesian Belief Network to improve the histopathological parameters for early acute transplant rejection in the renal allograft biopsies in collaboration with Professor Peter Furness, President of the Royal College of Pathologists-London, at University of Leicester, UK. A total of five peer-reviewed papers resulted from their collaboration. Kazi also trained further in renal electron microscopy with Professor Peter Furness at Leicester Royal Infirmary to upgrade electron microscopy for renal & transplant pathology in Pakistan at the Sindh Institute of Urology & Transplantation, making Sindh Institute of Urology & Transplantation the first and only center in Pakistan where diagnostic electron microscopy is regularly done on both native renal and renal allograft biopsy material. The Histopathology department at Sindh Institute of Urology & Transplantation, with the facility of renal & transplant pathology, has facilitated the institute to become the largest renal transplant centre in South Asia, conducting the highest number of renal transplants in the region.

Since the late 1990s, Kazi had been involved in promoting renal and transplant pathology in Pakistan. Kazi also headed the department of Histopathology at Dr. Ziauddin Hospitals since 2004. The department under his supervision developed special techniques like tumor markers by immunohistochemistry, immunofluorescence, and fluorescent in situ hybridization for accurate diagnosis and classification of cancers along with determining the prognosis, hormone receptors and drug sensitivity in common cancers of the population. The Ziauddin Histopathology laboratory has acquired the status of a referral center for cancer diagnosis in Pakistan.

Kazi was also the approved Higher Education Commission (Pakistan) supervisor for Ph.D. on histopathology.

Kazi was appointed the Dean, Faculty of Medicine- University of Karachi, by the Governor of Sindh in 2013 and served the honorary position till his demise in 2014. The Dean, Faculty of Medicine of University of Karachi, is the head of seven medical & dental colleges, with these colleges being affiliated with the University of Karachi. At the time of Kazi's appointment, the following medical colleges came under the deanship (of which some were previously affiliated with the University of Karachi), namely Karachi Medical and Dental College, Liaquat National Medical College of Liaquat National Hospital (previously affiliated), Sir Syed College of Medicine, Liaquat College of Medicine and Dentistry, Altamash Institute of Dental Medicine, Fatima Jinnah Dental College (previously affiliated) and Jinnah Medical Dental College (previously affiliated). The only public sector college is Karachi Medical & Dental College. The colleges which conduct both MBBS & Bachelor of Dental Surgery (BDS) programs are Karachi Medical & Dental College, Jinnah Medical Dental College, and Liaquat College of Medicine and Dentistry.

== Positions held & Honors ==
- Dean, Faculty of Medicine, University of Karachi
- Head and professor, department of Histopathology, Sindh Institute of Urology & Transplantation
- Head, Department of histopathology, Dr. Ziauddin Hospitals
- Head, chairman and professor of pathology, Karachi Medical and Dental College
- Member of the Editorial Board, Journal of Pakistan Medical Association
- Research Advisor for Immunology and Infectious Diseases- Research Lab, University of Karachi
- Fellow, College of Pathologists, Pakistan
- Member, Royal College of Pathologists, London
- Life Member, Pakistan Association of Pathologists
- Life Member, Middle East Society for Organ Transplantation

== Research and published work ==
Kazi's research work in renal & transplant pathology includes over 80 published works, mostly in international medical & scientific journals. These include the papers on the use of Bayesian Belief Network for accurate diagnosis of early acute transplant rejection at the University of Leicester with Professor Peter Furness, and the papers that described the true pattern of renal diseases in adults and children for the first time in Pakistan with Professor Adeebul Hasan Rizvi and Professor Muhammed Mubarak.

=== Books ===
- Mubarak, Muhammed; Kazi, Javed I. (4 April 2012). Topics in Renal Biopsy and Pathology. IntechOpen. ISBN 978-953-51-0477-3.

=== Scientific papers ===
Original research papers:

== Death ==
On 17 February 2014, Kazi was assassinated by unknown armed men while leaving the Karachi Medical and Dental College in his car, where he and his driver were shot multiple times. His driver drove him to Ziauddin Hospital where he succumbed to his injuries. His death sparked outrage in the medical fraternity of Pakistan and protests erupted following his death. The case could not be concluded and investigators were unsure of the motive behind the murder. Doctors and physicians from across the city came out to protest at the Civic Center, Karachi and outpatient departments of hospitals across the city were shut down as part of the strike. Demanding immediate arrest of the killers, doctors from various hospitals including Abbasi Shaheed Hospital & Karachi Institute of Heart Diseases refused to carry out their duties. A meeting was held at the seminar hall of the Civic Center, Karachi where the leaders of the doctors' community delivered their speech on Kazi and against his brutal murder. The central leader of the Pakistan Medical Association, Dr. Qaiser Sajjad, said that the killers should be given a stern punishment, while former president of Pakistan Medical Association- Professor Tipu Sultan also spoke on the occasion. The principal of Karachi Medical and Dental College demanded the government provide protection to the doctors.

Sindh Institute of Urology and Transplantation held a memorial where Professor Adeebul Hasan Rizvi said, "In his death, we have not killed a single person but rather have buried an era of technological expertise developed over so many years of hard work, dedication, and sacrifice."

The Karachi University Teachers Society condemned the murder of Kazi and remarked in a press release, " It is an unfortunate fact that innocent professors and teachers are being attacked with impunity, while the law enforcement agencies personnel were not laying hands on the culprits. If the previous such attacks were thoroughly investigated and the culprits brought to task, Pakistan would not have lost an able doctor like Javed Kazi." They deeply expressed the need to safeguard the country's intelligentsia amid the weak law and order situation in the city. The University of Karachi held a memorial for Kazi at its Art Auditorium while a condolence meeting was held at the Ziauddin University which was attended by various doctors and professors including Professor Pirzada Qasim, the vice-chancellor of Ziauddin University, where they praised and highlighted Kazi's contribution for the cause of medical education in Pakistan and Renal pathology, and demanded the arrest of the killers. The President of Pakistan Dental Association, Central Council – Dr. Saqib Rashid and the President of PDA Sindh – Dr. Mehmood Shah also held a joint meeting to condemn the assassination and termed it as a big loss for Pakistan's healthcare sector.

Professor Adeebul Hasan Rizvi delivered a keynote address in the inaugural session of the 40th annual conference of the Pakistan Association of Pathologists at the Sindh Institute of Urology & Transplantation in December 2017. He dedicated his address to Kazi as a tribute and highlighted his contributions in the field of pathology and nephro-pathology in Pakistan.

== Legacy ==
In 2017, the Alumni Association of Karachi Medical and Dental College started a scholarship program in the name of Kazi, 'Professor Javed Kazi and Professor Sohail Rafi Awards of academic excellence', to award the highest achieving medical students at Karachi Medical & Dental College.

The Histopathology Department at Sindh Institute of Urology & Transplantation was named after Kazi as the Javed I. Kazi Department of Histopathology, SIUT, who established it in 1995.
