= Patients' Welfare Association =

The Patients' Welfare Association (PWA) is a non-political, non-governmental organization (NGO) located within Civil Hospital, Karachi run by the students of Dow Medical College, which works for the medical aid of underprivileged patients by providing a number of services free of cost. The organization depends upon its donors and volunteers for its functionality and maintenance. Other than conventional charity donations and zakat funds, PWA also holds many fund raising campaigns such as bakesales and promotion in school campuses. Established in 1979, by three students of Dow Medical College, it soon transformed from being a small student based organization to a much larger movement with much coverage of their humanitarian deeds being publicized by means of local Television channels, Newspaper, Radio as well as their own newsletter which is circulated in their locality.

== History ==
Patients' Welfare Association was established as a small student based organization by three students of Dow Medical College in 1979, with simple services such as free of cost drugs for needy patients. In the years to come the organization gained much popularity and by 1982 it had gained enough funds and volunteer force to form a blood bank and a Thalassemia Follow-up Clinic. With their influence spreading, in 1986 a diagnostic laboratory was set up.

== Services ==
With the slogan "We feel, We serve," their existence depends on service to the underprivileged segment of society. The organization achieves this by means of several departments which have been built within the vicinity of Civil Hospital, Karachi.

=== Blood bank ===
The Blood bank provides more than 350 units of blood daily on exchange basis not only to patients of Civil Hospital Karachi, but also extends its services to patients all over the city. All units dispatched are screened for Hepatitis B, Hepatitis C, HIV, Syphilis and Malarial Parasite, thus ensuring patient safety. The blood bank also provides blood components such as packed cells, platelets and fresh frozen plasma. The Blood Bank has also started the service of providing mega unit of platelets to patients of Civil Hospital Karachi, free of cost.

=== Thalassemia Services ===
Previously working under the 'Follow Up Clinics', PWA Thalassemia Services was upgraded to a separate department with the start of transfusion facility for registered Thalassemia patients in 2011. The department has 260 registered patients with Thalassemia, a hereditary blood disorder. These patients are receiving regular blood transfusions and consultations by a qualified Haematologist along with regular diagnostic investigations. Due to shortage of funds, only 60 registered patients are currently being provided with Iron chelation therapy. Efforts are under-way to collect funds and start provision of Iron chelation therapy to all registered patients. The cost of treatment of one patients with this lifelong disease is Pakistani Rs. 300,000 - Rs. 500,000 per annum depending upon the age and blood transfusion needs of the patient. PWA Thalassemia Services is providing all these facilities completely free of charge.

== Other events ==
The Patients' Welfare Association holds many events; from fund raising activities to seminars concerning local medical issues. One of their main fund raising events is an annual ‘Food Mela', a bake sale of colossal magnitude, where funds more than one million rupees have been gathered in recent years.
