= Shoaib Tauheed =

Pakistani professor, medical doctor, researcher and an author (1960–2007)

Shoaib Tauheed MBBS, M Phil., MCPS, FCPS (1960–2007) was a professor, medical doctor, researcher and an author from Pakistan. He is widely known for his contributions in the field of Physiology and Medicine. Besides practicing clinical medicine he served as a professor and Head of the Department of Physiology in Dow Medical College, Dow University of Health Sciences (DUHS), Karachi. Since the establishment of the Dow University of Health Sciences, Prof. Tauheed was appointed chairman of the Physiology Department. He was also one of the members of the Curriculum Revision Committee of the Higher Education Commission, and was involved in expanding and conducting Continuing Medical Education courses at DUHS He also served as the Head of Physiology Department of Sindh Medical College, Karachi. He is still the first and only Pakistani to be a member of the American Physiological Society. Considered by many as the most favorite and popular professor among medical students.

== Life and work ==
Born in Larkana, Sindh. His father was Tohid Ahmad Siddiqui (died 1967) a famous teacher of the town. He passed his intermediate from D.J Science College in 1977, Karachi and was admitted to Dow Medical College, the same college where later he became the Head of the Department of Physiology.

He served as a professor and Head of the Department of Physiology at Dow Medical College, Dow University of Health Sciences, Karachi. Since the establishment of the Dow University of Health Sciences, Prof. Tauheed was appointed chairman of the Physiology Department. He was also one of the members of the Curriculum Revision Committee of the Higher Education Commission, and was involved in expanding and conducting Continuing Medical Education courses at DUHS He also served as the Head of Physiology Department of Sindh Medical College, Karachi. Dr. Tauheed was always involved in helping and training the students for this purpose he wrote a physiology book " Shoaib's Physiology" which is still used as a curriculum guide for the medical students in Pakistan. He was always actively involved and a supporter of research work for the medical students of Pakistan. In addition, he also served as the joint secretary of the Pakistan Physiological Society from 2006 to 2008.

The DUHS former Vice Chancellor Masood Hameed Khan said about Tauheed at the time of this death that it was all due to the efforts of Dr. Tauheed that post-graduate level work started for the first time at the Physiology department. The idea to initiate M.Phil and Ph.D. programs in Basic Medical Sciences was also put forward by Tauheed. The Professor Shoaib Tauheed Gold Medal is given to a DUHS student securing the highest marks in physiology each year.

== Death and legacy ==
Tauheed was diagnosed with cancer in 2005, and died at the age of 46 on 26 September 2007. Dow University created the Dr. Tauheed Power Lab and Shoaib Tauheed lecture Hall in his honour.
