= Ahmed Elkadi =

American Muslim activist (1940–2009)

- Born: Ahmed Elkadi; August 1, 1940; Egypt
- Died: 11 April 2009 (aged 68); Tampa, Florida
- Other names: Dr.Elkadi
- Citizenship: American
- Occupation: Doctor

Ahmed Elkadi (August 1, 1940, in Egypt – April 11, 2009) was a prominent leader of the U.S. Muslim Brotherhood and other organizations including the Islamic Circle of North America (ICNA), the Muslim Youth of North America (MYNA) and the Islamic Medical Association (IMA). He is considered to have been instrumental in the founding of the Muslim American Society. He died in Tampa, Florida, at the age of 69.

== Community ==
In the mid-1980s, Bay County's Islamic community began to grow. One of its earliest residents and founder, the late Dr. Ahmed Elkadi, saw the need for an Islamic School, so he established the Islamic Community School (ICS). The school was located in Springfield, Florida, and operated until June 1995. When ICS closed, Panama City Advanced School (PCAS) took its place in the spring of 1995. At first, PCAS used the Bay County Islamic Society facilities.

== Activism ==
Founder or co-founder of:

- Islamic Circle of North America (ICNA)
- Muslim Youth of North America (MYNA)
- Islamic Medical Association of North America
- Federation of Islamic Medical Associations
- Bay County Islamic Society
- Muslim American Society – co-founded with Omar Soubani of Lansing, Michigan and Jamal Badawi of Halifax, Nova Scotia in 1993. Zuhair Nurani was registered agent.

Key leadership positions in:

- North American Islamic Trust (NAIT) – President
