= Nausheen Hamid =

Pakistani politician (born 1961)

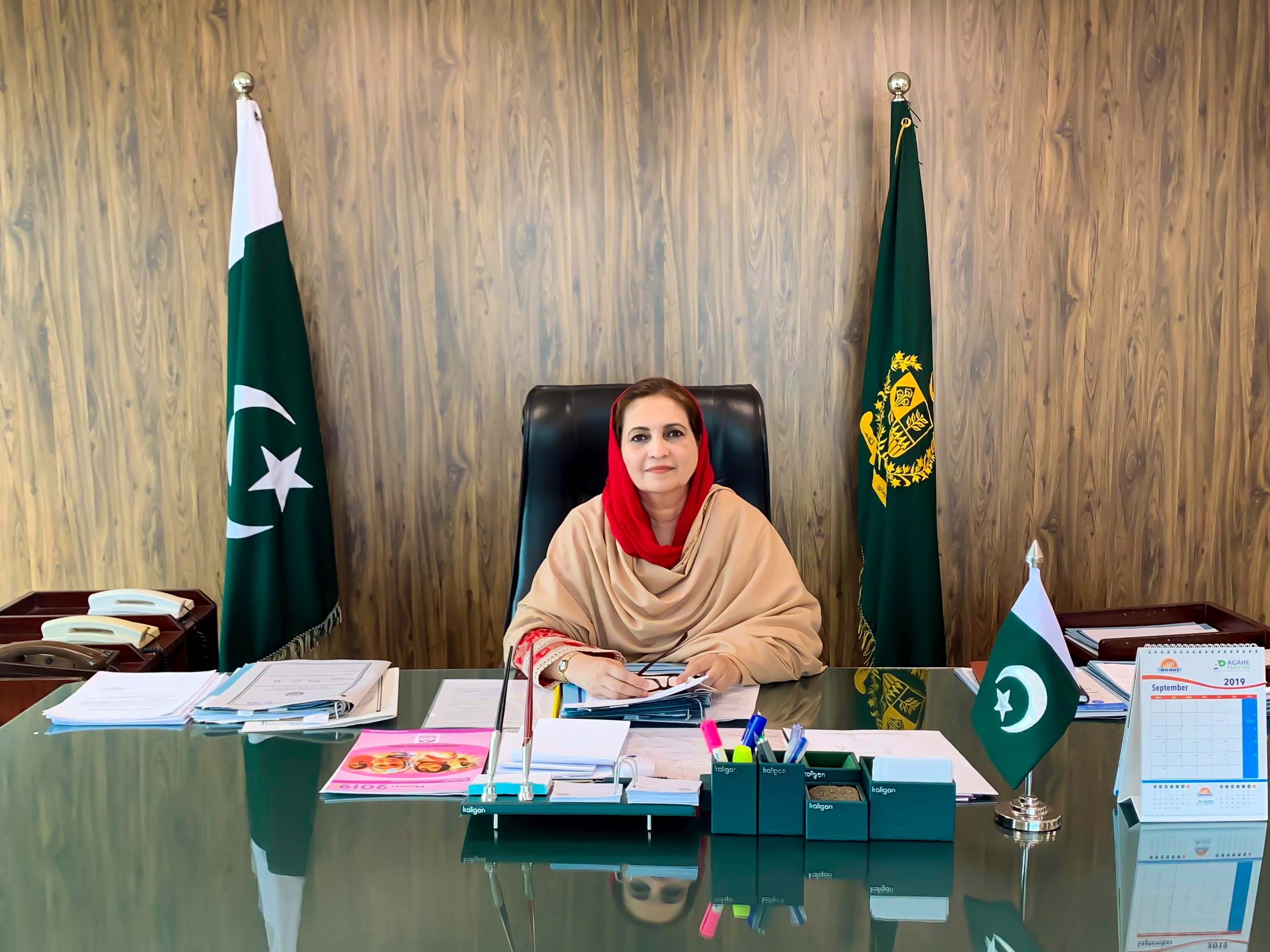

Parliamentary Secretary for the Ministry of National Health Services, Regulation and Coordination
- In office September 2018 – 10 April 2022
- President: Arif Alvi
- Prime Minister: Imran Khan

President Central Working Committee for Women Wing PTI
- Incumbent
- Assumed office 4 February 2020

Member of the National Assembly of Pakistan
- In office 13 August 2018 – 25 January 2023
- Constituency: Reserved Seat for Women (NA-297)

Member of the Provincial Assembly of Punjab
- In office 2013–2018
- Constituency: Reserved Seat for Women (W-356)

Vice President Central Working Committee for Women Wing Pakistan Tehreek-e-Insaf
- In office 2012–2013

Personal details
- Born: 19 February 1961 (age 65) Lahore, Punjab, Pakistan
- Party: PTI (2013-present)
- Education: Dow University of Health Sciences

Dr. Nausheen Hamid (Urdu: نوشین حامد; born 19 February 1961) is a Pakistani politician and social activist who served as a member of the National Assembly of Pakistan from August 2018 to January 2023. From September 2018 to April 2022, she served as the Parliamentary Secretary for the Ministry of National Health Services, Regulation, and Coordination.

Previously, she was a member of the Provincial Assembly of the Punjab (W-356), from 2013 to 2018 (16th Assembly). She served as a member of the Syndicate Board of Fatima Jinnah Medical University, during this tenure.

She currently serves as the president of the Central Working Committee for Insaf Women Wing of the Pakistan Tehreek-e-Insaf since 2020, having previously served as regional organizer of the party from 2010 to 2012 and central vice president of the Women's Wing from 2012 to 2013.

== Early life and education ==
Hamid was born on 19 February 1961, in Lahore and spent her early life in Karachi. Her father, Gulzar Ahmad Qureshi, was a civil servant and served as a Commissioner of Income Tax in the Government of Pakistan. She received her primary education at Sacred Heart School in Karachi, graduating in 1971. She completed her secondary education at Mama Parsi Girls' Secondary School, Alumni of 1976. She attended high school at St Joseph's Convent School. She earned the degree of Bachelor of Medicine and Bachelor of Surgery (MBBS) with distinction in BioChemistry from Dow Medical College in 1986.

She served as a demonstrator in Fatima Jinnah Medical College, from 1989 to 1990 and later as Medical Officer in Jinnah Hospital, Lahore. From 2006 to 2015, she was General Secretary of the Lahore Chapter of the Business and Professional Women's Foundation.

== Political background ==
Hamid belongs to a well-known political family of Lahore, Pakistan. Her father-in-law, Mian Miraj Din (1927-2005), Senior Vice President of PML Punjab, was elected a Member of the Provincial Assembly of West Pakistan from 1962 to 1965 (Parliamentary Secretary for Basic Democracies & Local Government) and 1965 to 1969 (Parliamentary Secretary for Services & General Administration and Home, Labour and Jails). He remained a Member of the Cial Assembly of the Punjab from 1993 to 1996 and 1997 to 1999 and functioned as Minister for Excise and taxation department, Punjab (Pakistan).

Her husband Mian Hamid Miraj, served as the Deputy Mayor of Lahore from 1993 to 1996. He contested the 2010 by-election from NA-123 after Javed Hashmi vacated the seat, on the ticket of Pakistan Tehreek-e-Insaf (PTI). He was elected as Senior Vice President of Punjab, Pakistan Tehreek-e-Insaf (PTI), in the 2013 intra-party elections.

Ahsan Rashid (1944-2014), a well-known Pakistani businessman, politician, and philanthropist, was her first cousin. He was among the founding members of PTI and a close aide of Imran Khan. He served as President of Pakistan Tehreek-e-Insaf Punjab.

== Political career ==
She joined Pakistan Tehreek-e-Insaf as her first political party in 2009 and served as Regional Organiser in the Women's Wing from 2010 to 2012. In May 2013, she was elected to the Provincial Assembly of the Punjab as a candidate of Pakistan Tehreek-e-Insaf (PTI) on a reserved seat for women in the 2013 Pakistani general election. She was nominated as vice president of the Central Women Wing Pakistan Tehreek-e-Insaf on 3 August 2014, while representing the party in the Punjab Assembly on opposition benches.

She was elected to the National Assembly of Pakistan as a candidate of Pakistan Tehreek-e-Insaf (PTI) on a seat reserved for women from Punjab in the 2018 Pakistani general election. On 27 September 2018, Prime Minister Imran Khan appointed her as Federal Parliamentary Secretary for the Ministry of National Health Services, Regulation, and Coordination.

She was notified on 4 February 2020 as the current President of the Central Working Committee for Insaf Women's Wing Pakistan Tehreek-e-Insaf and takenthe oath on 14 February 2020.
