= Basheer Ahmed =

Indian physician, academician and author

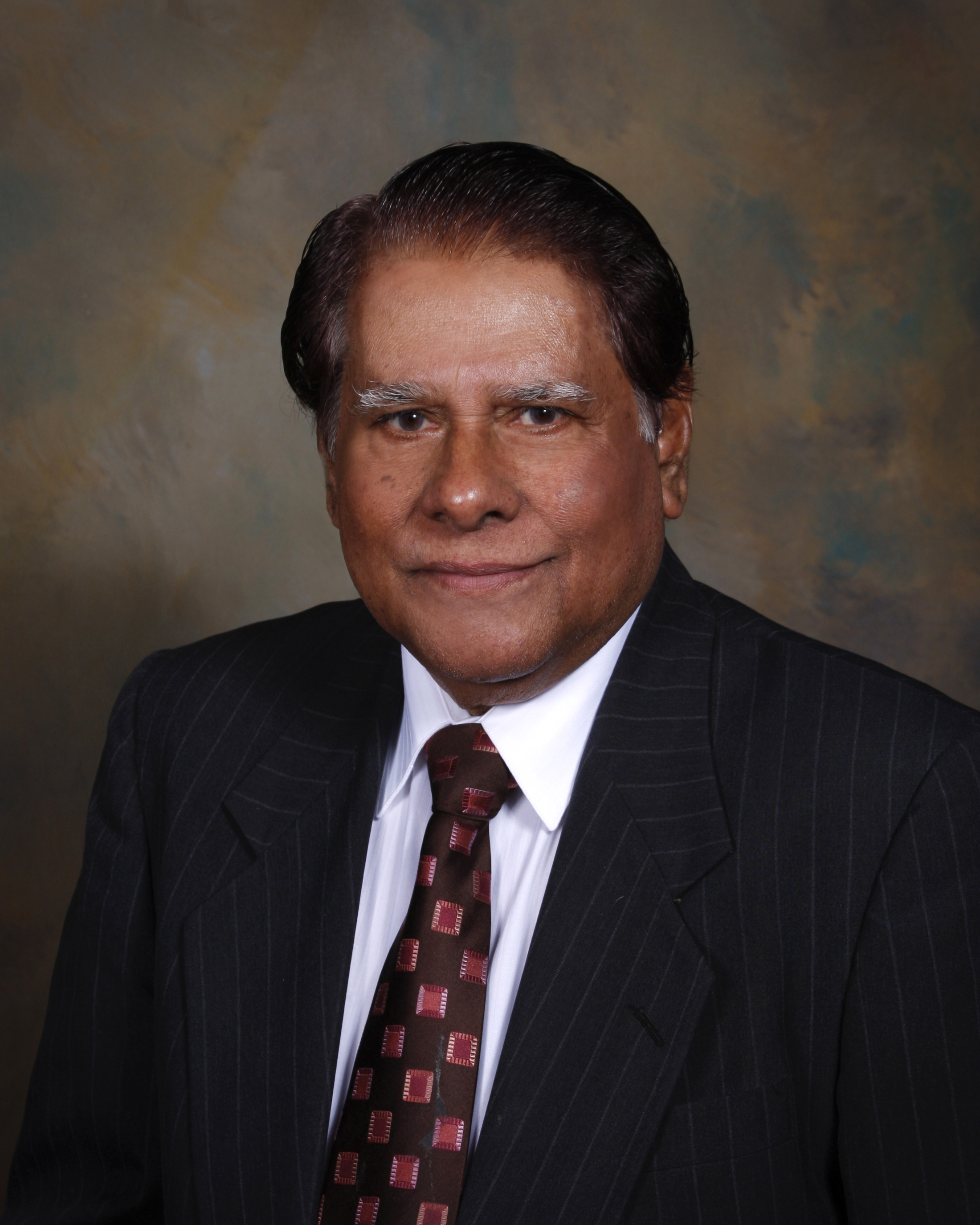
- Born: Hyderabad Deccan, India
- Education: Osmania University; Dow Medical College; Karachi University; Glasgow University
- Occupations: Physician, academic, author
- Spouse: Shakila Ahmed
- Children: Sameer Ahmed, Araj Ahmed
- Website: https://www.basheerahmed.com/

Basheer Ahmed is an Indian physician, academic and author currently residing in the USA.

== Early life ==
Ahmed was born in Hyderabad Deccan, India in 1935. After Graduating from Omani University, he earned his medical degree from Dow Medical College, Karachi University, Pakistan, in 1960. He completed his post graduate studies and residency training in Psychiatry at the University of Glasgow, Scotland After competing his training Ahmed migrated to the United States and served as both the director of the psychiatric unit at the St. Louis State Hospital, St. Louis, Missouri as well as the director of psychiatric services at St. Louis County General Hospital, St. Louis Missouri in 1968. Ahmed is also a fellow of the Royal College of Psychiatrists, London as well as a fellow of the Royal College of Physicians and Surgeons of Canada and a distinguished life fellow of the American Psychiatric Association.

== Career ==
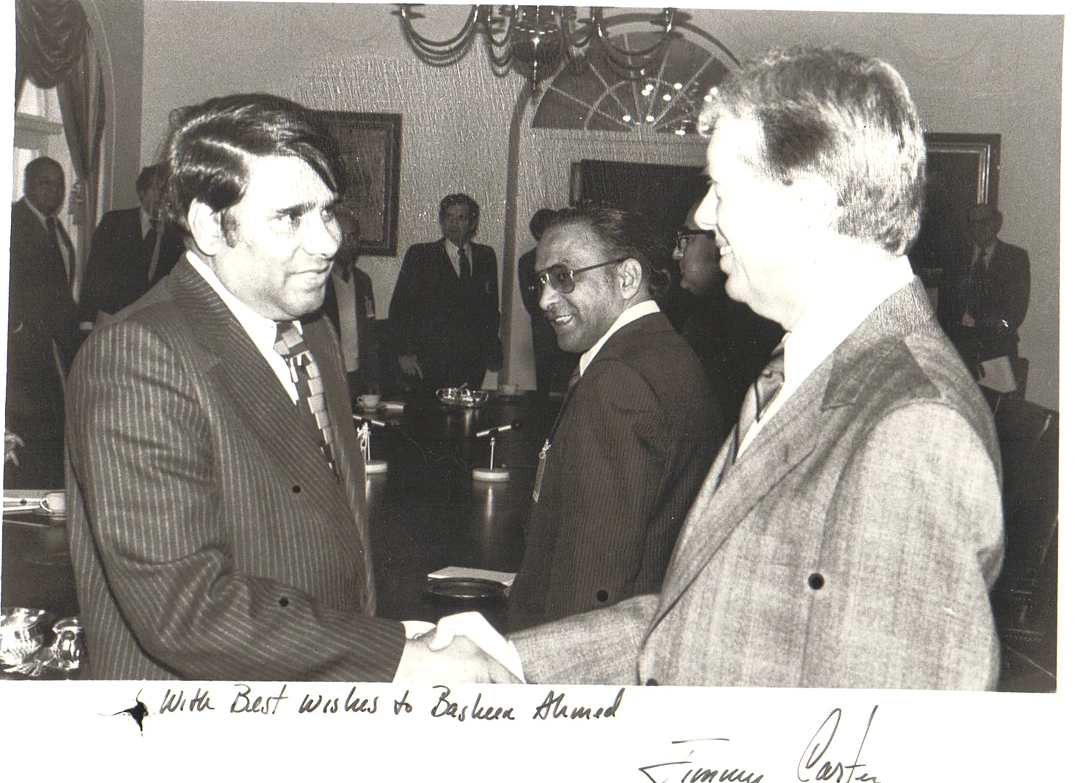
Ahmed's meeting with President Jimmy Carter

Ahmed's interest in academic psychiatry led him to the Albert Einstein College of Medicine, New York City in 1971 where he served as the Assistant Professor of Psychiatry for five years. He also served as the Director of Soundview Throngs Neck Community Mental Health Center, one of the largest CMHC in New York City, managed by Albert Einstein College of Medicine, New York City. He also served as a member of the Board of Directors of the National Council of Community Mental Health Centers and as the Regional Director for the region II. He became a member of the American Psyciatric Association in 1968 and served as a secretary of The Bronx District branch in 1975. During this period in New York Ahmed visited several European countries, including Denmark and Russia, to study psychiatric practices across Europe.

In 1976, Ahmed moved to Dayton Ohio where he became the Professor of Psychiatry at Wright State University and also the Chief of Psychiatry at the local VA Hospital. He also served as the director of the psychiatric residency training program at Wright State University. Ahmed then moved from Ohio to Texas where he worked as a professor of Psychiatry and family medicine at the University of Texas Health Science Center, Southwestern Medical School Dallas Texas from 1978 to 1982. During his association at the University of Texas Health Science Center, Ahmed trained family practice residents in Behavioral Medicine. Dr. Ahmed also served as the Chief of Psychiatry at John Peter Smith Hospital Fort Worth.

In 1979, Ahmed became a member of the Tarrant County Medical Society. He also served as the chairman of the Tarrant Chapter of the Texas Society of Psychiatric Physicians and was the program chairman of the annual Texas Society of Psychiatric Physicians meeting in Fort Worth Texas. He has also served as a member of the publication committee and on the Board of Directors of Project Access of the Tarrant County Medical Society.

In October 1979, at the invitation of 39th President of the United States Jimmy Carter, Ahmed (as the President of the Islamic Medical Association, 1978–79), met with the president at the White House along with 15 other US Muslim leaders to discuss the Iranian crises and Muslims in the USA.

In 1983, he left his academic career and entered into the private practice of Psychiatry in Fort Worth, Texas. He served as a Director of Psychiatric Departments in several hospitals including St. Joseph Hospital, Psychiatric Institute Fort Worth, Oak Bend Psychiatric Hospital Fort Worth, Care Unit Hospital and Plaza medical center, Fort Worth, Texas.

Ahmed served as the president of the Islamic Medical Association of North America (1979–80). He is the founding board member of the International Institute of Islamic medicine. Ahmed has served as the president of the Islamic Association of Tarrant County (1982–83). He also served as a member of the board of directors of the Islamic Social Service Association. He served on the board of directors of the Multicultural Alliance of North Texas from 2006 to 2016.

== Philanthropy and Community Services ==
Ahmed has been active for many years in developing Islamic institutions that support the Muslim community to prosper by providing services as well as facilities that promote well being in their communities.

In 1995, Ahmed founded the Muslim Community Center for Human Services to serve indigent residents of the Dallas-Fort Worth area.[4] MCC for Human Services was the first Muslim charitable organization in the state of Texas that provided medical and social services, including free medical, dental, and mental health services to indigent residents of the Dallas-Fort Worth area, irrespective of race, religion, and country of origin.

Ahmed has been active in organizing conferences on domestic violence, the role of organized religion in promoting world peace and the many Muslim contributions to civilization.

In 2011, Ahmed and The Muslim Community Center for Human Services stepped up their efforts to provide services to their community despite their being cut-backs from the federal government towards spending for social services.

The medical clinic for the center was treating 1,600 to 1,800 patients a year, and new patients were asked only to make a $10 donation. Low-cost lab work and prescription drugs were also made available. More than 200 people each year also were receive dental care.

== Awards And Recognition ==
Ahmed has received numerous awards for his leadership, humanitarian service, academic contributions, and interfaith work.

- 1974-2003 - Physician Recognition Award from the American Medical Association.
- 2000 - Life Fellow of the American Psychiatric Association.
- 2002 - Outstanding contributions in medicine from the Asian American Chamber of Commerce.
- 2003 - Distinguished Life Fellow of the American Psychiatric Association.
- 2005 - Community Services Award from the Daughters of Abraham in North Texas.
- 2007 - Recognition Award for Medical services from The Association of Physicians of Pakistani Decent of North America
- 2008 - Humanitarian Award from the Tarrant County Medical Society.
- 2009 - The Community Services Award from the Islamic Society of North America.
- 2010 - The Recognition Award from the Center for Pluralism, Dallas.Texas.
- 2012 - The Recognition Award for Humanitarian Services from the Islamic Medical Association of North America.
- 2014 The Peacemaker of the Year Award from the Dallas Peace and Justice Center.
- 2017 - Achievement Award from the Multicultural Alliance of North Texas.
- 2017 - Diversity Beyond Boundaries Award from the Greater Dallas Asian American Chamber of Commerce.

== Bibliography ==
- Muslim Contribution to World Civilization, publisher: The International Institute of Islamic thought UK, 2005, ISBN 156564-411-5, reprint: ISBN 1-56564-410-7
- Islamic Intellectual Heritage and its impact on the West Publisher: Institute of Medieval and Post Medieval Studies, USA, 2008, ISBN 978-1604618990
- Domestic violence cross cultural perspective Published by Xilbris Corporation, USA, 2009, ISBN ISBN 978-1441544728
- My Story as a Muslim Immigrant in America- Psychiatry, social activism and service, Publisher: Lioncrest, USA, 2017, ISBN 978-1-61961-839-8
- The Rise and Fall of Muslim Civilization: Hope for the Future, Publisher: Mary Ethel Eckard US, 2022, ISBN 979-8-9857287-0-5
- Why Are Americans Obsessed with Guns and Willing to Pay a High Price, Second Edition, Publisher: Mary Ethel Eckard US, 2022, ISBN 979-8-9857287-8-1
- Hasan Ibn Al Haytham: The First Scientist, Publisher: Mary Eckard Publishing US, 2026 ISBN 9781966561
- Abu Al-Qasim Al-Zahrawi: A Pioneer of Modern Surgery, Publisher: Mary Eckard Publishing US, 2026 ISBN 9781966561
- Ibn al-Nafis: Father of Circulatory Physiology, Publisher: Mary Eckard Publishing US, 2026 ISBN 978-1-966561-62-0
- Hasan Ibn Al Haytham: The First Scientist, Publisher: Mary Eckard Publishing US, 2026 ISBN 978-1-966561-39-2

== Personal life ==
Basheer Ahmed married Shakila Ahmed, a radiologist. They have two children Sameer Ahmed , an attorney in Dallas, Texas and Araj Ahmed, an attorney with the Department of Justice in Washington D.C.
