= Abdul Bari Khan =

Pakistani surgeon and businessman

Abdul Bari Khan HI TI EF
- پروفیسر ڈاکٹر عبدالباری خان
- Born: 1961 (age 64–65); Karachi
- Citizenship: Pakistan
- Education: MBBS, FCPS, Dow Medical College
- Occupation: Cardiac Surgeon
- Years active: 1986
- Employer: Indus Hospital and Health Network
- Organization: Indus Hospital and Health Network
- Known for: philanthropy
- Notable work: Indus Hospital and Health Network
- Awards: Hilal-i-Imtiaz (2019); Tamgha-e-Imtiaz (2015); Eisenhower Fellowship (2004)

CEO of Indus Hospital and Health Network

Abdul Bari Khan HI TI EF (born 1961) (Urdu: پروفیسر ڈاکٹر عبدالباری خان) is a Pakistani cardiac surgeon and businessman. He is the founder of Indus Hospital and Health Network (IHHN) and served as the Network's CEO from 2007 to 2022. He has since taken on the new role as President of the Network.

== Early life and education ==
Khan was born in 1961 in Karachi. He received his MBBS from Dow Medical College.

== Awards and honours ==
- Hilal-i-Imtiaz (2019)
- Tamgha-e-Imtiaz (2015)
- Eisenhower Fellowship (2004)
- Asian Leadership Award (Lifetime Achievement Award)
- Hall of Fame - DOW Graduate Association of North America
- Honorary Trustee of Iqra Rozatul Atfal Trust
