= Arthur Gaitskell =

British colonial administrator (1900–1985)

Sir Arthur Gaitskell CMG (23 October 1900 – 8 November 1985) was a British administrator of the East Africa Royal Commission.

== Family life ==
He was born in Rangoon, Burma, British India, to Arthur Gaitskell (1870–1915), of the Indian Civil Service, and Adelaide Mary (née Jamieson) Gaitskell (died 1956), whose father, George Jamieson, was consul-general in Shanghai and prior to that had been Judge of the British Supreme Court for China and Japan. His brother was Hugh Gaitskell.

== Career ==
He was chairman of the Sudan Gezira Board which had oversight of the Gezira Scheme. He was appointed to the East Africa Royal Commission (1953–55).

== Publications ==
- Gaitskell A. (1959) Gezira: A Story of Development in the Sudan, London: Faber & Faber
