= East Africa Royal Commission =

1953 British government report

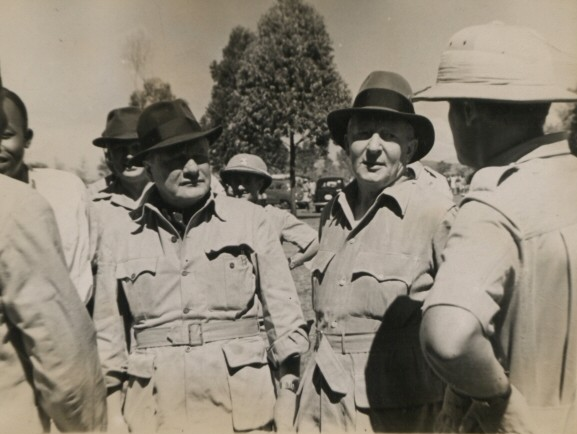
Sir Hugh Dow, Sir Frederick Seaford, East African Royal Commission. 1st Visit to Africa Spring. 1953

The East Africa Royal Commission was a commission set up by the British government to review issues of economic development in British colonies across British East Africa.

The Commission was established by Royal Warrant on 1 January 1953. It consisted of Hugh Dow, Sally Herbert Frankel, Arthur Gaitskell, Rowland Skeffington Hudson, Daniel Jack and Chief Kidaha Makwa.

It focused on six issues

1. economic development through introduction of improved farming methods
2. reforming the traditional tribal systems of land tenure
3. making more land available for cultivation and settlement
4. finding suitable locations for industrial development
5. reviewing conditions of employment in industry, commerce, mining and plantation agriculture in relation to the growth of large urban populations
6. the social problems which arise form increased urbanisation and industrialisation

== Report ==
East Africa Royal Commission Report 1953-5
