= James Underwood (pathologist) =

British pathologist

Sir James Underwood FMedSci
- Born: 11 April 1942 (age 84); Walsall, England, UK
- Education: St Bartholomew's Hospital Medical College
- Known for: General and Systematic Pathology
- Awards: The Cunningham Medal, The Doniach Award
- Scientific career
- Fields: Medicine, Pathologist
- Workplaces: School of Medicine and Biomedical Sciences, University of Sheffield

Sir James Cresseé Elphinstone Underwood FMedSci (born 11 April 1942) is a British pathologist who was awarded a knighthood for services to medicine in the 2005 New Year honours list.

== Early life and education ==
Underwood was born at Walsall in 1942, where his father, John Underwood, was a general practitioner. The family settled in Cheltenham in 1948. He was educated at Downside School, Somerset. From 1960-1965 he was a medical student at St Bartholomew's Hospital Medical College, and a house doctor at St Stephen's Hospital, Chelsea.

== Career ==
He was formerly the Dean of Sheffield University's Faculty of Medicine and Biomedical Sciences and the Joseph Hunter Professor of Pathology at the same university as well as Consultant Histopathologist to the Sheffield Teaching Hospitals NHS Foundation Trust. From 2000–2002, by election, he served as the President of the British Division of the International Academy of Pathology and he was later elected as the President of the Royal College of Pathologists from 2002–2005.

He led his profession's response to the problems arising from tissue retention and use in the UK. Just before retirement, at the age of 64, Underwood became a fellow of the Academy of Medical Sciences.

He was a member of the Human Tissue Authority, which monitors and regulates use of human organs in research and education. During his career Sir James recalled making a mistake when he mistook a benign adenomatoid tumor for a malignant testicular tumor, which resulted in the patient having a testicle removed unnecessarily.

== Research interests ==
- Liver disease
- Breast disease
- Medical Education (particularly the role of autopsy)
- He has worked on over 100 research articles
- Distinguished lecturer

== Personal ==
Sir James Underwood and his wife, Lady Alice, have three children. Outside work, he finds music interesting and he enjoys walks with his family.

== Books ==
- The book Underwood's Pathology: a Clinical Approach (published in 2013), was named after Sir James, and it won the 2014 British Medical Association Student Textbook Award.
- Co-editor of General and Systematic Pathology, Churchill Livingstone, 2009 (5th edition). Previous editions have won Sir James and contributing authors the Royal Society of Medicine Book Award (2000, 3rd Edition) and the British Medical Association Student Textbook Award (2005, 4th Edition) and a first prize in the British Book Design and Production Awards (2001, 3rd Edition).
- Former co-editor of Recent Advances in Histopathology
- Editor of Introduction to biopsy interpretation and surgical pathology
- Editor of Pathology of the nucleus
- Editor of Case studies in General and Systematic Pathology
- Former editor of the journal Histopathology

Educational offices
| Preceded by Sir John Lilleyman | President of the Royal College of Pathologists; 2002 – 2005 | Succeeded by Adrian Newland |
