= Sanjay Gangwani =

Pakistani politician

Member of the Provincial Assembly of Sindh
- In office 13 August 2018 – 11 August 2023
- Constituency: Reserved seat for minorities

Personal details
- Born: August 16, 1979 (age 46) Karachi, Sindh, Pakistan
- Relations: Married
- Children: 2

Sanjay Gangwani (Urdu: سنجے گنگوانی) is a Pakistani politician who is an elected member of the Provincial Assembly of Sindh and a close associate to the Prime Minister of Pakistan, Imran Khan. He is the son of a technocrat, Murlidhar. P. Gangwani.

== Political career ==
Dr. Sanjay Gangwani was elected to Provincial Assembly of Sindh on a reserved seat for minorities in 2018 Pakistani general election representing Pakistan Tehreek-e-Insaf. He started his political Career in 2008 and later on the influence of Ali Haider Zaidi joined Pakistan Tehreek-e-Insaf in 2011. He consider Imran Ismail and Arif Alvi his political mentors. Sanjay Gangwani is a Medical Doctor by profession, studied at Dow Medical College from where he has received his Bachelors of Surgery and Bachelors of Medicine degree. He has been continuously working for the rights of minorities in Pakistan and decided to join PTI Pakistan Tehreek-e-Insaf in order to serve the nation and his people. Sanjay Gangwani has been visiting interiors to check the medical facilities for the poor and needy. Recently along with other members of PTI delegation arrived in Tharparkar on a two-day exploratory visit. They visited different sections of Civil Hospitals at Umerkot, Chachro and Mithi, and inquired about the health of the admitted children and other patients and distributed relief material. They also discussed the issues of patient care, state of medical equipment and medicine supply with the medical superintendent and other doctors. Sanjay Gangwani believes patriotism is the key to protect the motherland. For the outstanding contribution by the Gangwani Family, the government of Pakistan has named the road on the name of Sanjay Gangwani in Karachi Development Authority Scheme 1. Today, the road is known as Sanjay Gangwani Road. He gives the credit to this honor to his father's (Dr. Engr. M. P. Gangwani)'s unconditional contribution to the country.

== Social and charitable causes ==
Dr. Sanjay Gangwani is an active member of SOS Children's Villages and UNICEF. He believes in giving back to the society. His father was a very active social worker in Pakistan who has served as the president Rotary Club, president (IEP - Foundation), district governor Lions Clubs International, governor Rotary International District 3271, president of Friends Association, president of Pakistan Minority Wing, and president NED Old Boys Association. Following his fathers dream, Dr.Sanjay has been organizing free medical camps and seminars for the poor and needy in Pakistan. He has organized several medical camps and seminars in Karachi along with Arif Alvi. They both have helped in organizing camps which focuses on "Eye" emergencies in the undeveloped and rural areas of Sindh, so far they have helped more than 200 eye patients with major eye surgeries for free and recently started the campaign to create awareness for heart ailments. Since, Dr. Gangwani is a certified cardiologist he has been working to organize camps and seminars for patients with heart ailments and related problems. Dr. Sanjay Gangwani is an active member of Pakistan Hindu Council and Pakistan Hindu Panchayat both the organizations were founded by his father (M. P. Gangwani). Also, he is an avid supporter of Edhi Foundation, and Saylani Welfare Trust. He is also serving as a Director of International Affairs at Rotary Club.

== Personal life ==
Sanjay Gangwani is a Medical Doctor by profession, studied at Dow Medical College from where he has received his Bachelors of Surgery and Bachelors of Medicine degree. He later went to the United Kingdom for his certification of (MRCS) Membership of the Royal Colleges of Surgeons of Great Britain and Ireland. After coming back to Karachi he joined Dr. Ruth Pfau Hospital. He is married and has two children. His father Engr. Dr. M.P. Gangwani was the Founder and president of Pakistan Hindu Council, Founding president of Pakistan Hindu Panchayat and Patron-in-Chief of Pak Hindu Welfare Association. Dr. Sanjay Gangwani is an active member of Pakistan Hindu Council and Pakistan Hindu Panchayat. Gangwani Family is also socially very active and have been members of some of the most prestigious clubs, such as, Karachi Gymkhana, Karachi Golf Club, Sind Club, Dubai Creek Golf & Yacht Club, Lahore Gymkhana Club and Bombay Gymkhana.

Gangwani family is one of the most highly respectable and educated families in Pakistan. Sanjay Gangwani has two younger brothers Rakesh Gangwani an alumnus of NED University of Engineering and Technology, University of Indianapolis, and Wharton School of Business and Jitesh Gangwani an alumnus of University of Indianapolis, Johns Hopkins University Texas A&M University both are settled in the United States of America. Rakesh Gangwani is married to Priya Gangwani, who is an recipient of Jefferson Awards for Public Service and also serving as the Founding President of Grassroots Projects. His father Engr. Dr. M.P. Gangwani has done his graduation in Mechanical Engineering from NED University of Engineering and Technology and later went to Imperial College London and Kyoto University for his Masters in Industrial Engineering and Heavy equipment, and University of Manitoba for his Doctor of Philosophy in Human Resource Management. Even his Grandfather Deewan Parmanand Gangwani was a barrister who graduated from Bombay University in 1946 and was a class mate of Ram Jethmalani and L. K. Advani in Shikarpur, Sindh. Deewan Parmanand Gangwani was a prominent lawyer and served as the Municipal Commissioner of District Shikarpur. Renowned Lawyer and Writer Shaikh Ayaz has discussed in details about his friendship with Deewan Parmanand Gangwani is his book Shah Jo Risalo and explained how Deewan Parmanand Gangwani was the only person used to be with him in his bad times and used to visit him while he was in exile and is one of the biggest influence in his life. Deewan Parmanad Gangwani worked in several cases along with A. K. Brohi they both were very good friends and he also discussed about his friendship with Gangwani in his book (Testament of faith). Dr. Sanjay is also serving as a Director of International Affairs at Rotary International where his father served as a Governor of District 3721. For the outstanding contribution by the Gangwani family the government has named a road on the name of Dr. Sanjay Gangwani in Karachi Development Authority Scheme 1 in Karachi and a public park in Hyderabad, Sindh, as M. P. Gangwani Park.
