= Sally Herbert Frankel =

South African-born economist and Oxford professor (1903–1996)

- Born: 22 November 1903; Johannesburg, South Africa
- Died: 12 December 1996 (aged 93) (PhD)
- Children: 2

Academic background
- Education: University of Johannesburg (MA); London School of Economics

Academic work
- Discipline: Economics; Development economics Colonial economics
- Institutions: University of the Witwatersrand; University of Oxford
- Notable works: Capital Investment in Africa (1938); Money: Two Philosophies (1977); Money and Liberty (1980); An Economist's Testimony (1992)

Sally Herbert Frankel (1903–1996) was Professor firstly of Colonial Economic Affairs, and later the Economics of Underdeveloped Countries at Oxford University in the period following the Second World War.

Originally from South Africa, of German-Jewish descent, he moved to England shortly after the Second World War. He joined the Mont Pelerin Society in 1950. While not religiously observant, Frankel was committed to the principle of Jewish peoplehood and was a keen Zionist from the First World War onwards.

He was a member of the East Africa Royal Commission (1953–1955).

At Oxford he was associated with institutionally focused critiques of development planning, emphasizing the importance of historical context and stable political and legal frameworks for long-term growth.

== Publications ==
- Frankel S. H. (1926) Co- operation and Competition in the Marketing of Maize in South Africa London: P. S. King & Son Ltd.
- Frankel S. H. (1928) Railway Policy of South Africa: An Analysis of the Effects of Railway Rates, Finance and Management on the Economic Development of the Union Johannesburg: Hortors Limited
- Frankel S. H. (1938) Capital Investment in Africa: its course and effects London: Oxford University Press
- Frankel S. H. (1938) The Economic Impact on Under-developed Societies Oxford: Basil Blackwell
- Frankel S. H. (1977) Money: two philosophies:the Conflict of Trust and Authority Oxford: Basil Blackwell
- Frankel S. H. (1980) Money and Liberty Washington DC: American Enterprise Institute.
- Frankel S. H. (1982) An Economist's Testimony Oxford: Oxford Centre for Postgraduate Hebrew Studies.
