= Adrian Newland =

British haematologist

Professor Adrian Newland CBE FRCP FRCPath

Professor of Haematology, Queen Mary and Westfield College, London/Queen Mary University of London
- Incumbent
- Assumed office 1992

Personal details
- Born: Adrian Charles Newland; 26 August 1949 (age 76)
- Occupation: Haematologist

Adrian Charles Newland (born 26 August 1949) is a British haematologist, former President of the Royal College of Pathologists and consultant at the Barts and The London NHS Trust.

Educational offices
Preceded by Sir James Underwood	President of the Royal College of Pathologists; 2005 – 2008	Succeeded by Peter Furness
