= Daniel Jack =

British political economist (1901-1984)

Daniel Thomson Jack (1901–1984) was a British political economist who was Professor of Economics at the University of Durham.

Jack graduated from the University of Glasgow. He was appointed to the East Africa Royal Commission (1953–1955).

Andrew Skinner was the first incumbent when the Daniel Jack professorial chair in economics was created at the University of Glasgow.
