= Dow Medical College =

Public medical school in Karachi, Pakistan

Dow Medical College کالج طبی ڈاؤ
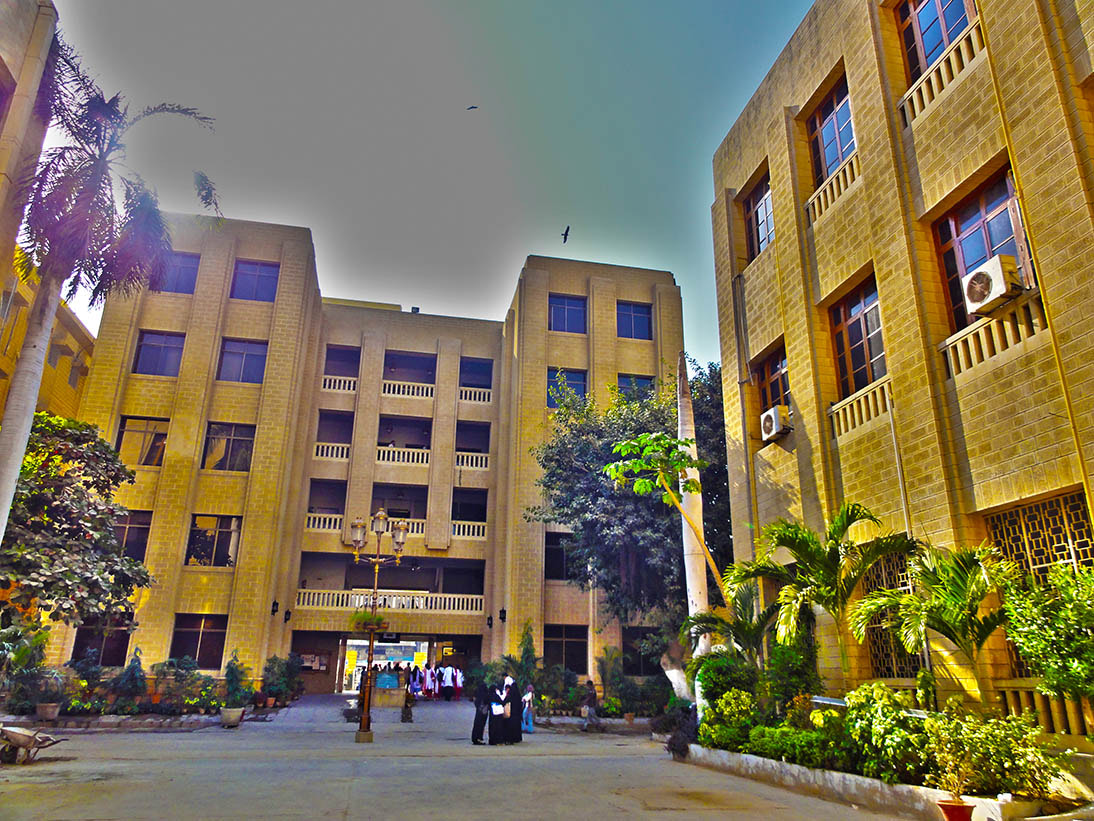
- Dow Medical College, Karachi
- Type: Public
- Established: 1945
- Affiliations: Dow University of Health Sciences
- Principal: Prof. Saba Sohail
- Location: Karachi, Sindh, Pakistan
- Website: Official website

Dow Medical College is a public medical school located in the city of Karachi, Sindh, Pakistan. It was founded in 1945 and named after British civil servant Sir Hugh Dow, Governor of Sindh.

In 2003, it became a constituent college of the newly formed Dow University of Health Sciences.

== History ==
Sir Hugh Dow laid foundation stone of Dow Medical College, Karachi, on 10 December 1945, at the site of old NJV School. Three weeks later, on 31 December 1945, the college consisting of forty-five students, including one female Muslim student, transferred from Hyderabad to Karachi. The Government of Sindh under the lead of then Health minister Dr. Hemandas Wadhwani, arranged this transfer. The 20 member teaching faculty was led by Dr Kewalram Tarasing Ramchandani as the Principal. Some staff taught multiple subjects. It was initially housed in the old NJV High School Building on Mission Road. The new building was inaugurated in November 1946. Until 1947, it was an affiliate of University of Bombay. After the independence of India, it was under the University of Sindh. After the University of Karachi was founded, it became its affiliate. It was in 2003 when the Dow University of Health Sciences was established as an independent institution, with Dow Medical College and two other colleges being put under its umbrella.

== E-CME Program ==
Dow University of Health Sciences launched its web-based Continuing Medical Education Program named the "e-CME Program for the Family Physicians".

== Notable alumni ==
Dow Medical college is a large provider of physicians to Pakistan and also to the United States. It is the Pakistani medical school with the highest amount of licensed physicians in the United States per the 2018 FSMB Survey with 3,232 licensed physicians. Its notable graduates include:

- Basheer Ahmed - physician and American medical academic
- Abdul Bari Khan - Cardiologist, philanthropist and CEO of Indus Hospital and Health Network
- Adeebul Hasan Rizvi – Transplant Urologist, philanthropist and head of Sindh Institute of Urology and Transplantation.
- Sanjay Gangwani - Pakistani Politician
- Musarrat Hussain, director of Jinnah Post Graduate Medical Centre and president of the Pakistan Psychiatrists Society.
- Rafat Hussain – Deputy Head of the School of Rural Medicine at the University of New England, Australia
- Ishrat-ul-Ibad Khan – Governor of Sindh, Pakistan.
- Shabuddin H. Rahimtoola, MBBS, FRCP [Edin], MACP, MACC, D.Sc. (Hon) - Author, Cardiologist at Mayo Clinic best known for his work in valvular heart disease, coronary artery disease, results of cardiac surgery, and arrhythmias along with cardio-myopathy and congenital heart disease.
- Fahad Mirza - Actor and Model
- Azra Raza - Author, Director of Myelodysplastic Syndrome (MDS) Center at Columbia University
- Javed Iqbal Kazi, Dean of medicine- University of Karachi, Sindh Institute of Urology & Transplantation
- Nausheen Hamid - Pakistani politician and social activist, member of the National Assembly of Pakistan
- Tahir Shamsi - Pakistani hematologist and bone marrow pioneer

== See also ==
- Official Website of Dow University of Health Sciences
- DOW Graduates Association of North America (DOGANA)
- DOW Graduates Association of Northern Europe
- DUHS e-CME Programme
- Mohiuddin-Muhammad/Muhammad M. Mohiuddin, MBBS
