= Musarrat Hussain =

Pakistani psychiatrist

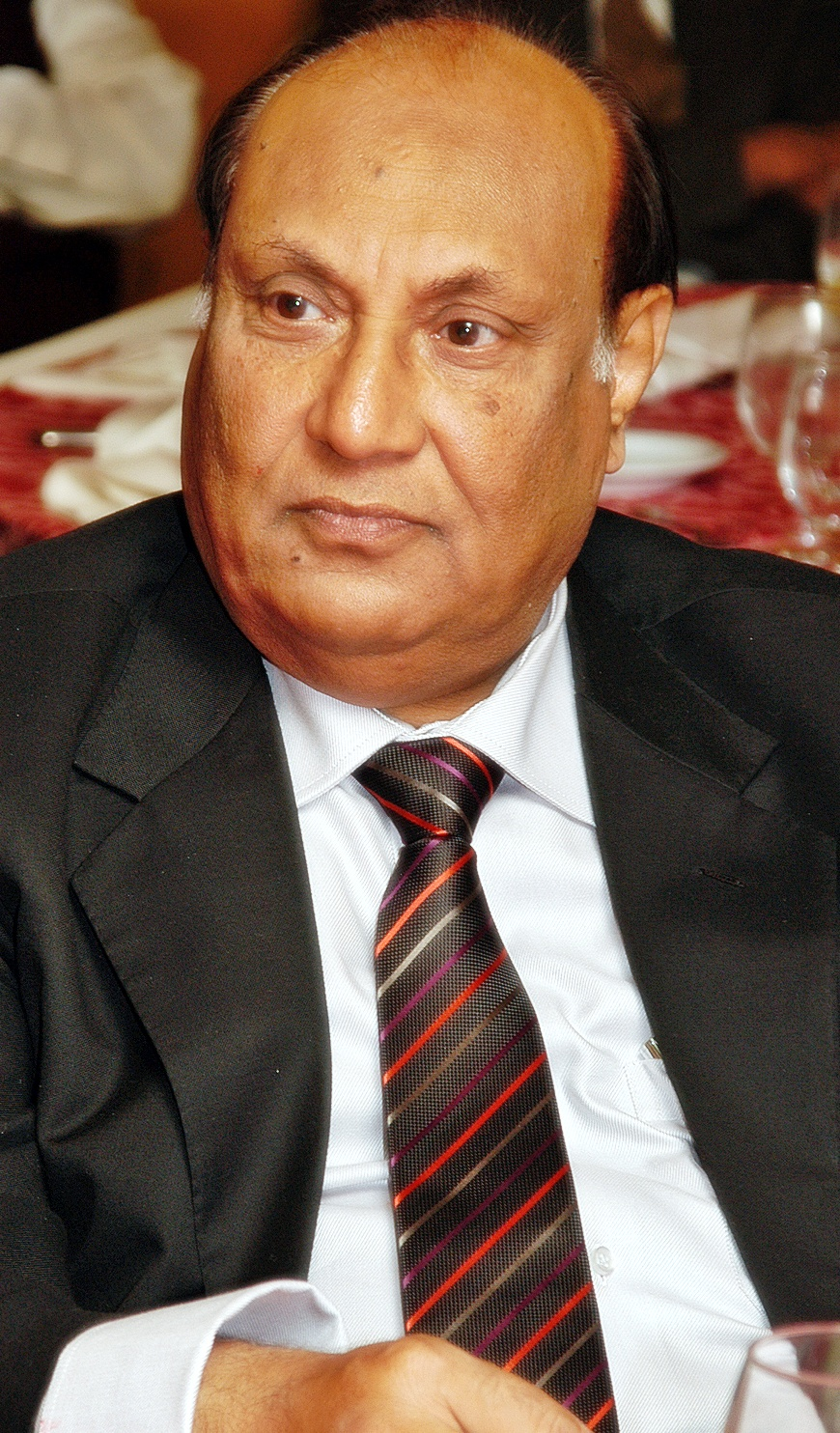
Prof. Musarrat Hussain

Musarrat Hussain was a Pakistani psychiatrist. He served as an executive director of Jinnah Post Graduate Medical Centre, Karachi. He also served as a president of Pakistan Psychiatrists Society.

Hussain studied at Dow Medical College, Karachi. Later, he went to Germany and completed his postgraduation. He died on 3 August 2011 at the Agha Khan Hospital, Karachi.

In order to pay tribute to his services to society, Prof Musarrat Hussain Memorial Psychiatric Symposium was held in Karachi from 22 to 24 June 2012.
