= Hugh Dow =

British colonial administrator and diplomat (1886–1978)

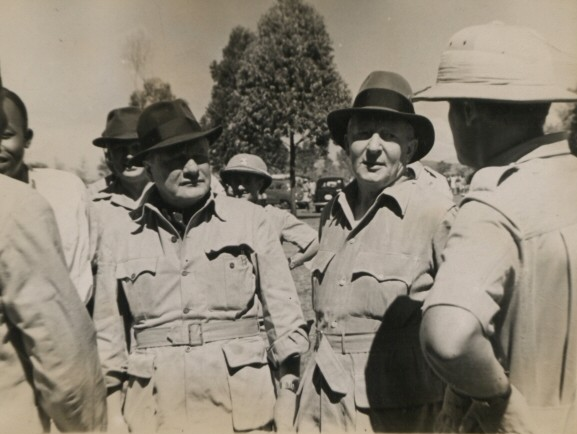
Dow (left) on a visit to East Africa in 1953

Sir Hugh Dow GCIE KCSI (8 May 1886 – 20 November 1978) was a British colonial administrator and diplomat who served as the governor of Sindh from 1941 to 1946. He also served as the British consul-general to Jerusalem from 1948 to 1951, after the independence of India from British colonial rule. The Dow Medical College is named after him.

== Early life and political career ==
Hugh Dow was born on 8 May 1886. He joined the Indian Civil Service in 1909 and served in various administrative and advisory positions throughout British India. From 1939 to 1941, Dow served as Director-General of Supply and President of the War Supply Board; from 1941 to 1946, he served as the governor of Sindh. In 1946, he started serving as governor of Bihar, holding the office until 1947 when India became independent from British colonial rule. During his tenure as governor of Bihar, the region witnessed communal violence between Muslims and Hindus, including the 1946 Bihar riots, which the All-India Muslim League blamed on Dow and the Indian National Congress. He was appointed as a companion of the Indian Empire in 1932, a CSI in 1937, knighted as a Knight Commander of the Indian Empire in 1940, and appointed as a Knight Grand Commander of the Indian Empire in 1947. Dow laid the foundation stone of Dow Medical College, now a constituent college of the Dow University of Health Sciences in Karachi, in December 1945.

== Hur insurgency ==
Dow served as the governor of Sindh from 1 April 1941 to 14 January 1946, succeeding Sir Lancelot Graham. During his term as governor, Pir of Pagaro VI, a Sufist Pir (spiritual leader), led a group of fellow Hurs in an insurgency against British colonial rule. Pagaro's followers attacked police, military and civilian targets, killing dozens. In response, Dow called for the introduction of martial law to Sindh, which was passed through the Sindh Assembly via the 1942 Hur Suppression Act; martial law remained in effect in Sindh from June 1942 to May 1943. British Indian Army, Indian Imperial Police and Royal Air Force elements were engaged in counterinsurgency operations against the Hurs, arresting several leaders including Pagaro himself. Pagaro was tried in a military court on charges of "conspiring to war against the King-Emperor", found guilty and hung on 20 March 1943.

== Later life and death ==
After leaving India, Dow served as the British consul-general to Jerusalem from 1948 to 1951 and subsequently the chairman of the East Africa Royal Commission. He died on 20 November 1978.

Government offices
Preceded by Sir Lancelot Graham	Governors of Sind; 1941–1946	Succeeded by Sir Robert Francis Mudie
