= Tahir Shamsi =

Pakistani physician, researcher, and haematologist (1962–2021)

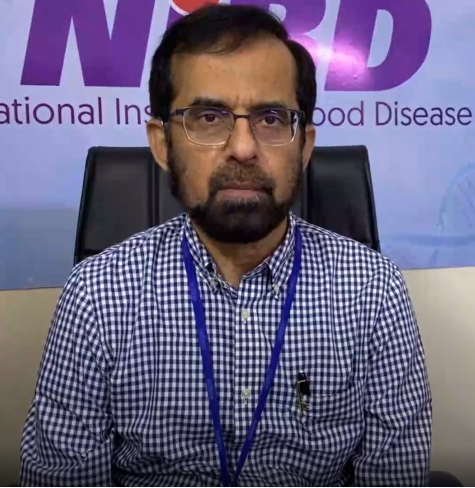
- Born: 18 February 1962
- Died: 21 December 2021 (aged 59)
- Education: Dow Medical College; Royal College of Pathologists
- Occupations: physician, researcher and hematologist
- Known for: Bone marrow transplant
- Medical career
- Institutions: National Institute for Blood Diseases (founder)
- Sub-specialties: hematology
- Awards: Lifetime achievement award (2016) (by The Dow Graduates Association of North America)

Tahir Sultan Shamsi (Urdu: ڈاکٹر طاہر سلطان شمسی; 18 February 1962 – 21 December 2021) was a Pakistani professor of medicine, researcher and pioneer of Bone marrow transplant in Pakistan worked, as a clinical hematologist and bone marrow transplant physician. He established the National Institute for Blood Diseases (NIBD). He was the director of the Stem Cell Programme at NIBD as well.

== Life and career ==
Shamsi was born on 18 February 1962. At the age of eight, he memorized the Quran. He graduated from Dow Medical College in 1988 and received a postgraduate degree from the Royal College of Pathologists. He died from a stroke on 21 December 2021, at the age of 59.

== Achievements ==
A pioneer of bone marrow transplants in Pakistan, the doctor performed the first transplant in the country in 1995 after returning from the United Kingdom. Shamsi is credited with introducing bone-marrow transplants in Pakistan in 1996. So far, he performed 650 bone-marrow transplants and wrote over 100 research articles.

== Awards and honors ==
- Fellow of the Royal College of Physicians
- Lifetime achievement award by The Dow Graduates Association of North America (2016)

== Publications ==
- Paidas, Michael J.; Hossain, Nazli; Shamsi, Tahir S.; Rodger, Marc A.; Langhoff-Roos, Jens; Lockwood, Charles J. (2010). Hemostasis and Thrombosis in Obstetrics and Gynecology. John Wiley & Sons. ISBN 978-1405183994.
