= Rafat Hussain =

- Citizenship: Australian
- Occupation: Associate Professor

Academic background
- Education: Ph.D
- Alma mater: Australian National University

Academic work
- Discipline: epidemiology
- Institutions: Australian National University Medical School; University of New England (Australia)

Rafat Hussain is an Associate Professor of Population Health, at the Australian National University Medical School & the Centre for Research on Ageing, Health and Wellbeing (CRAHW), Research School of Population Health, Australian National University, Canberra. She was previously a Professor of Public Health and Deputy Head of the School of Rural Medicine at the University of New England in Armidale, New South Wales, Australia.

== Early life and education ==
She earned an MBBS in 1984 from Dow Medical College, a Master of Public Health in 1990 from the University of North Carolina, and a PhD in epidemiology and population health in 1998 from the Australian National University.

== Career ==
From 1987 to 1993, she worked as an academic at the Aga Khan University, Karachi, where she was actively involved in teaching, clinical care and establishment of primary health care programs.

Hussain has worked as a senior lecturer in the Department of Public Health and Nutrition at University of Wollongong and as a visiting fellow at the National Centre for Epidemiology and Population Health.
