= Adeebul Hasan Rizvi =

Pakistani transplant surgeon

- Born: September 11, 1938 (age 88); Kalanpur, United Provinces, British India
- Education: Dow Medical College
- Occupations: Physician and Surgeon
- Awards: Ramon Magsaysay Award (1998); Lifetime Achievement Award (2015)

Adeebul Hasan Rizvi (born 11 September 1938) is a Pakistani philanthropist, urologist, and founder of the Sindh Institute of Urology and Transplantation (SIUT), the largest kidney transplant centre in Pakistan. This institute is affiliated with the nearby Civil Hospital, Karachi.

== Early life and career ==
Rizvi was born on 11 September 1938 in a small village Kalanpur in Jaunpur district, Uttar Pradesh, British India. He graduated from Dow Medical College in Karachi, Pakistan in 1968. Thereafter he went to UK to pursue his postgraduate training. After finishing his studies there, he returned to Pakistan. "In those days most people returned from the UK with cars, but guess what, Dr. Rizvi returned with a container full of medical equipment".

While living in the UK, Rizvi was inspired by the National Health Service and decided to try that idea in Pakistan. Rizvi set up an eight-bed urology ward at the Civil Hospital, Karachi in 1970.

SIUT started as an eight-bed ward at Civil Hospital, Karachi, and has grown to be Pakistan's leading and largest urology and transplantation institute with branches (satellite centers) spreading from Kathore near Karachi to far North in Azad Kashmir.

Rizvi is the president of the Transplant Society of Pakistan. In 2003, Rizvi led a team of SIUT surgeons that performed the first successful liver transplant on an infant in Pakistan.

In 2001, police arrested "a gang that was planning to murder" Rizvi.

== Awards and recognition ==
- Ramon Magsaysay Award in 1998
- Hamdan Award for Volunteers in Humanitarian Medical Services in 2004
- WHO's Shousha Prize in 2008
- Lifetime Achievement Award by The Sindh Association of North America in 2015
- Nishan-i-Imtiaz (Medal of Distinction) Award by the President of Pakistan in 2018
