= Journal of the Pakistan Medical Association =

- Discipline: Medicine
- Language: English
- Edited by: Fatema Jawad

Publication details
- History: 1951-present
- Publisher: Pakistan Medical Association (Pakistan)
- Frequency: Monthly
- Impact factor: 0.781 (2020)

Standard abbreviations
- ISO 4: J. Pak. Med. Assoc.

Indexing
- CODEN: JJPAD4
- ISSN: 0030-9982 (print); 0030-9982 (web)
- OCLC no.: 777505389

Links
- Journal homepage; Online archive

The Journal of the Pakistan Medical Association is a monthly peer-reviewed medical journal published by the Pakistan Medical Association. It publishes editorials, original articles, case reports, and letters concerning medicine and health practices. The editor-in-chief is Fatema Jawad.

== Abstracting and indexing ==
The journal is abstracted and indexed in Index Medicus/MEDLINE/PubMed, BIOSIS Previews, and the Science Citation Index Expanded. According to the Journal Citation Reports, the journal has a 2012 impact factor of 0.409.
