= Peter Furness =

British pathologist

Peter Norman Furness (born 2 Sept 1955) is a British pathologist, professor of pathology at the University of Leicester, and president of the Royal College of Pathologists 2008–2011.

Professor Furness was elected for a second term of office as President of the Royal College of Pathologists in 2020 but was debarred from office after allegations of misconduct were upheld following an independent investigation and disciplinary hearing.

Educational offices
Preceded by Adrian Newland	President of the Royal College of Pathologists; 2008 – 2011	Succeeded by Archie Prentice
