= Karachi Metropolitan University =

Public medical university in Karachi, Pakistan

- دانشگاه شهری کراچی
- Other name: KMDC
- Former names: Karachi Medical & Dental College
- Motto: Knowledge for All
- Type: Public
- Established: 1991
- Endowment: Karachi Metropolitan Corporation
- Vice-Chancellor: Wasim Qazi
- Principal: Attiya Sabeen Rehman
- Students: 1650
- Postgraduates: 4200
- Location: Karachi, Sindh, Pakistan
- Campus: Urban
- Colors: Green
- Website: thekmu.edu.pk

Karachi Metropolitan University is a public medical university in Karachi, under the administration of Karachi Metropolitan Corporation.

== History ==
It was founded as Karachi Medical & Dental College by Naimatullah Khan in 1991.

It offers MBBS and BDS programs at undergraduate level which are accredited by the Pakistan Medical and Dental Council. KMDC also offers postgraduate specialties in medicine and dentistry in affiliation with the College of Physicians and Surgeons Pakistan and University of Karachi.

Karachi Mayor Barrister Murtaza Wahab announced that Karachi Medical and Dental College status has been changed to a university and the name of Karachi Medical and Dental College is now Karachi Metropolitan University.
