= Azra Raza =

Columbia University medical researcher

- Born: Karachi, Pakistan

Academic background
- Education: Dow Medical College, Roswell Park Comprehensive Cancer Center

Academic work
- Discipline: Cancer research
- Sub-discipline: myelodysplastic syndrome acute myeloid leukemia
- Institutions: Roswell Park Comprehensive Cancer Center, University of Cincinnati, Rush University, University of Massachusetts, Columbia University
- Website: http://azraraza.com

Azra Raza is a Pakistani-American oncologist. She is the Chan Soon-Shiong Professor of Medicine and director of the Myelodysplastic Syndrome (MDS) Center at Columbia University. She has previously held positions at Roswell Park Comprehensive Cancer Center, University of Cincinnati, Rush University, and the University of Massachusetts. Raza's research focuses on myelodysplastic syndrome and acute myeloid leukemia.

She is the author of The First Cell: And the Human Cost of Pursuing Cancer to the Last.

== Early life ==
Raza was born in Karachi, Pakistan, and became interested in biology and evolution as a child. She completed her undergraduate medical education at Dow Medical College in Pakistan.

== Academic and research positions ==
Raza moved to Buffalo, New York, for a residency at Roswell Park, where she researched the biology and pathology of myeloid malignancies. At the age of 39, Raza was named a professor at Rush University in Chicago. At Rush, she worked as the Charles Arthur Weaver Professor of Cancer Research, and went on to be the first director of the school's Division of Myeloid Diseases. She was later named the Director of Hematology and Oncology at the University of Massachusetts, and the Gladys Smith Martin Chair in Oncology later still. Raza was also the Director of the Myelodysplastic Syndrome (MDS) Center at St. Vincent's Comprehensive Cancer Center.

Raza later became Professor of Medicine and Director of the MDS Center at Columbia University.

== Research ==
Raza's research has defined the cell cycle kinetics of myeloid leukemia cells in vivo in myelodysplastic syndrome and acute myeloid leukemia by studying cellular proliferation in patients. Her work led later researchers to believe that low blood counts were not a result of bone marrow failure, but instead a hyper-proliferative state in the marrow tissue, leading to hematopoietic cell apoptosis.

Raza has also developed a tissue bank of cancer patients that contains several thousand specimens of patient tissue for her research (60,000k+); she uses the samples to identify treatment programs through genetic testing. This also resulted in a research partnership with Cancer Genetics in 2014, "to identify more accurate diagnostic and prognostic markers for myelodysplastic syndromes (MDS), as well as novel therapies to target this class of bone marrow cancers." Her research into acute myeloid leukemia has shown that a mutation in osteoclasts of patients with the disease could be one of the causes of the cancer they develop.

Raza has also used genomic technology to further research the pathology of myelodysplastic syndrome, as well as RNA sequence and global methylation studies, and was a part of President Barack Obama's "cancer moonshot" program that reported to Vice-president Joe Biden.

== Writing ==
Raza's 2009 book Ghalib: Epistemologies of Elegance, co-written with Sara Suleri Goodyear, analyzed the work of the Urdu poet Ghalib, and included translations of Ghalib's Ghazals that the co-authors performed themselves. Raza also hosts Pakistani artists during visits to New York City. She also co-wrote Myelodysplastic Syndromes & Secondary Acute Myelogenous Leukemia: Directions for the New Millennium in 2001.

Raza's work has appeared in The New England Journal of Medicine, Nature, Blood, Cancer, Cancer Research, British Journal of Haematology, Leukemia, and Leukemia Research. She has also contributed to newspapers as an author, and has provided talks to organizations like TEDx New York.

The hypothesis that early detection and prevention of cancer may be the most efficient solution for the cancer was summarized in Raza's essay in The Wall Street Journal entitled "Cancer is still beating us. We need a new start".

== Critical acclaim ==
Raza's 2019 book The First Cell has received critical acclaim from many sources:

- The New York Times, Books to Watch For in October 2019
- Amazon, Top 100 Books of 2019
- LitHub, Most Anticipated Books of 2019
- BookRiot, Must-Read Books on Cancer
- Amazon, Best Science Books of 2019
- Starred Review from Publishers Weekly
- Starred Review from Kirkus

Henry Marsh, in the New York Times, wrote, "Raza suggests the first cancer cell that gives rise to a tumor is like a grain of sand that precipitates the collapse of a sand pile. Research, she says, should concentrate on finding these early changes, before an actual tumor develops."

The Times (London) reported, "Her most ambitious project, though, is the MDS-AML (myelodysplastic syndromes-acute myeloid leukaemia) Tissue Repository, in which tissue from every bone marrow biopsy she has taken over 35 years is banked. Founded in 1984, it's the oldest repository of its kind created by a single physician and contains 60,000 samples from Raza's patients, including, painfully, her husband's."

Barbara Kiser wrote in Nature: "Each year, the United States spends US$150 billion on treating cancer. Yet as oncologist Azra Raza notes in this incisive critique-cum-memoir, the treatments remain largely the same. Raza wants to see change: eliminating the first cancer cell rather than 'chasing after the last', which is doable with current technologies. Meanwhile, she braids often-harrowing stories of patients, including her own husband, with insights gleaned from laboratory and literature on this complex, often confounding array of diseases."

== Personal life ==
Raza was married to the late Harvey David Preisler, Director of Rush Cancer Institute.

== Awards ==
Raza was a Hope Funds for Cancer Research honoree in 2012. She also received the Distinguished Services in the Field of Research and Clinical Medicine award from Dow Medical College in 2014. Raza is the namesake of the Dr. Azra Raza scholarship award at her secondary school alma mater, Islamabad Model College for Girls F-7/2.
