= Islamic Medical Association of North America =

Muslim medical organization in North America

Islamic Medical Association of North America

The Islamic Medical Association of North America (IMANA) is one of the largest faith-based medical groups in the world and is the largest Muslim medical organization in North America.

It was founded in 1967 in Illinois and is a non-profit 501(c)(3) organization dedicated to the ideals of Islamic medicine. The mission of IMANA is to provide a forum and resource for Muslim physicians and other health care professionals in the United States and Canada. IMANA seeks to promote a greater awareness of Islamic medical ethics and values among Muslims and the community-at-large, to provide humanitarian and medical relief, and to be an advocate in health care policy. The current headquarters for the organization is located in Lombard, Illinois.

IMANA is the charter member of the Federation of Islamic Medical Associations, along with 26 other Islamic Medical Associations around the world.

== History ==
IMANA was founded by physicians Mobin Akhtar, Bashir Zikria, and Amjad Ali in 1967 as branch of the Muslims Students Association. It soon after became its own organization.

== Relief efforts ==
IMANA is known for its relief efforts in various locales around the world, such as Indonesia and Pakistan. After the tsunami hit Indonesia in December 2004, IMANA sent a medical relief team to the region, and shortly thereafter established a clinic to replace several hospitals in Banda Aceh that had been destroyed.

In 2005, IMANA has been working with the Pakistan Islamic Medical Association (PIMA) to provide medical relief for the victims of the Kashmir earthquake. They have provided a significant amount of money through donations. In addition, they are sending medical relief teams to the region, consisting of doctors and healthcare professionals from all over North America.

In January 2010, the IMANA relief committee initiated an effort in Haiti after the earthquake centered near Port-au-Prince. The effort, coordinated with other groups, allowed several teams of physicians and surgeons to treat patients in Port-au-Prince.

== Conventions ==
IMANA has several medical conventions per year, including the annual convention. Every other year, the convention is held internationally. Previous conventions have taken place in locations such as Spain, Turkey, Egypt, and Jordan. The 2006 International Convention was held in Beijing, China and was the most successful convention in the organization's history. The 40th annual convention was held in Niagara Falls, Canada from July 17–22, 2007.

Speakers at various IMANA conferences have included notable physicians, medical professionals, Muslims in various fields and government dignitaries.

The 2008 meeting was the first joint meeting with FIMA (the Federation of Islamic Medical Associations) and was held in Morocco.

== Publications ==
The Journal of the Islamic Medical Association (JIMA) is IMANA's quarterly peer-reviewed medical publication.

IMANA also publishes a quarterly newsletter, the Islamic Medical Association Newsletter.
