= Sindh Institute of Urology and Transplantation =

Sindh Institute of Urology and Transplantation (SIUT)
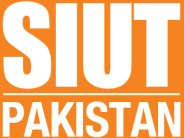

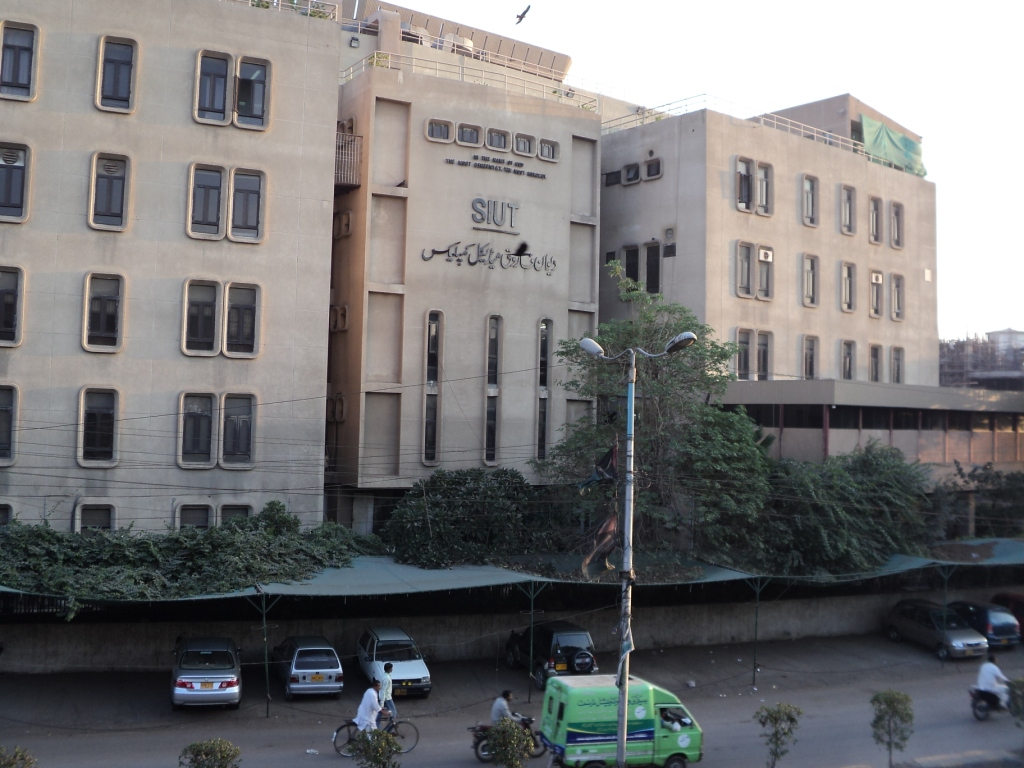

Geography
- Location: SIUT Karachi Pakistan Near Civil hospital Karachi, Karachi, Sindh, Pakistan

Organisation
- Type: Public
- Affiliated university: HEC CPSP

Services
- Emergency department: Yes
- Beds: 1000

History
- Founded: 1970

Links
- Website: www.siut.org

The Sindh Institute of Urology and Transplantation (SIUT) is a tertiary referral hospital specialized in nephrology, urology, dialysis and kidney transplant. It is located in Karachi, Sindh, Pakistan.

SIUT was founded by Adeebul Hasan Rizvi and it is one of the largest kidney disease center in Pakistan.

== History ==
It began as a department of urology at the government-run Civil Hospital in 1970 and became autonomous in 1991. Ten to twelve transplants are performed weekly, and in 2003, doctors at SIUT performed Pakistan's first liver transplant. In 2004, a child care unit was opened. All services provided by SIUT, including dialysis and transplantation, are provided free of cost with dignity.

== SIUT Chablani Medical Center Sukkur ==
Sindh Institute of Urology & Transplantation (SIUT)
- SIUT Chablani Medical Centre

Geography
- Location: Minaret Road، Takkar Muhalla,, Sukkur, Sindh, Pakistan

Organisation
- Type: Specialist and teaching

Services
- Emergency department: Yes
- Beds: 110

History
- Founded: 2012 by Adibul Hasan Rizvi

Links
- Website: www.siut.org

Establishing SIUT, Sukkur, was an innovative response to the need of the people of Sindh was planned in the year 2009. Rizvi anticipates the needs of his patients and responds accordingly. To make dialysis accessible, he conceptualized a network of satellite centers in various parts of Pakistan to save patients the trouble of commuting from far-flung areas of Sindh, southern parts of Punjab and Baluchistan to go for this procedure twice a week as far as Karachi.

On 2 February 2012 Adibul Hasan Rizvi, Director Sindh Institute of Urology and Transplantation, along with a team of doctors and paramedical staff inaugurated SIUT-Chablani Medical Center Sukkur. Initially as a day care Dialysis Center with 16 Haemodialysis machines and OPD, which shall facilitate a large number of underprivileged patients of Upper Sindh, Lower Punjab & Baluchistan.

=== Clinical laboratory ===
On 3 October 2013, a special ceremony was held at the Sindh Institute of Urology and Transplantation (SIUT) Chablani Medical Center to dedicate its clinical laboratory in memory of Tanveer Abbasi a renowned writer, poet and intellectual of Sindh.

=== Indoor ward ===
In second phase in April 2014, SIUT Chablani Medical center was upgraded to a full-fledged hospital, having 36-bed in its indoor ward. The indoor facilities reported 1,256 indoor admissions in same year and 33,918 patients went to the thrice-a-week outpatient clinic, 16,403 dialysis sessions were performed with 16 Hemodialysis machines, 2,400 patients received lithotripsy, the laboratory carried out 111,913 tests and 4,254 surgeries.

=== Operation Theater Complex ===
The Operation Theater Complex was completed with PKR 260 million and was finally inaugurated on the Saturday 27 April 2019 having four State-of-the-art Operation theaters with a total capacity of 60 beds of which 10 are in the surgical ICU.

=== Kidney transplant ===
SIUT is performing deceased organ donation since two decades as one person loses his fight to live every 3 minutes due to end stage organ failure in the country.

First renal transplant was performed at SIUT Chablani Medical Center, Sukkur on Sunday 28 April 2019.

== SIUT Trust Hospital ==
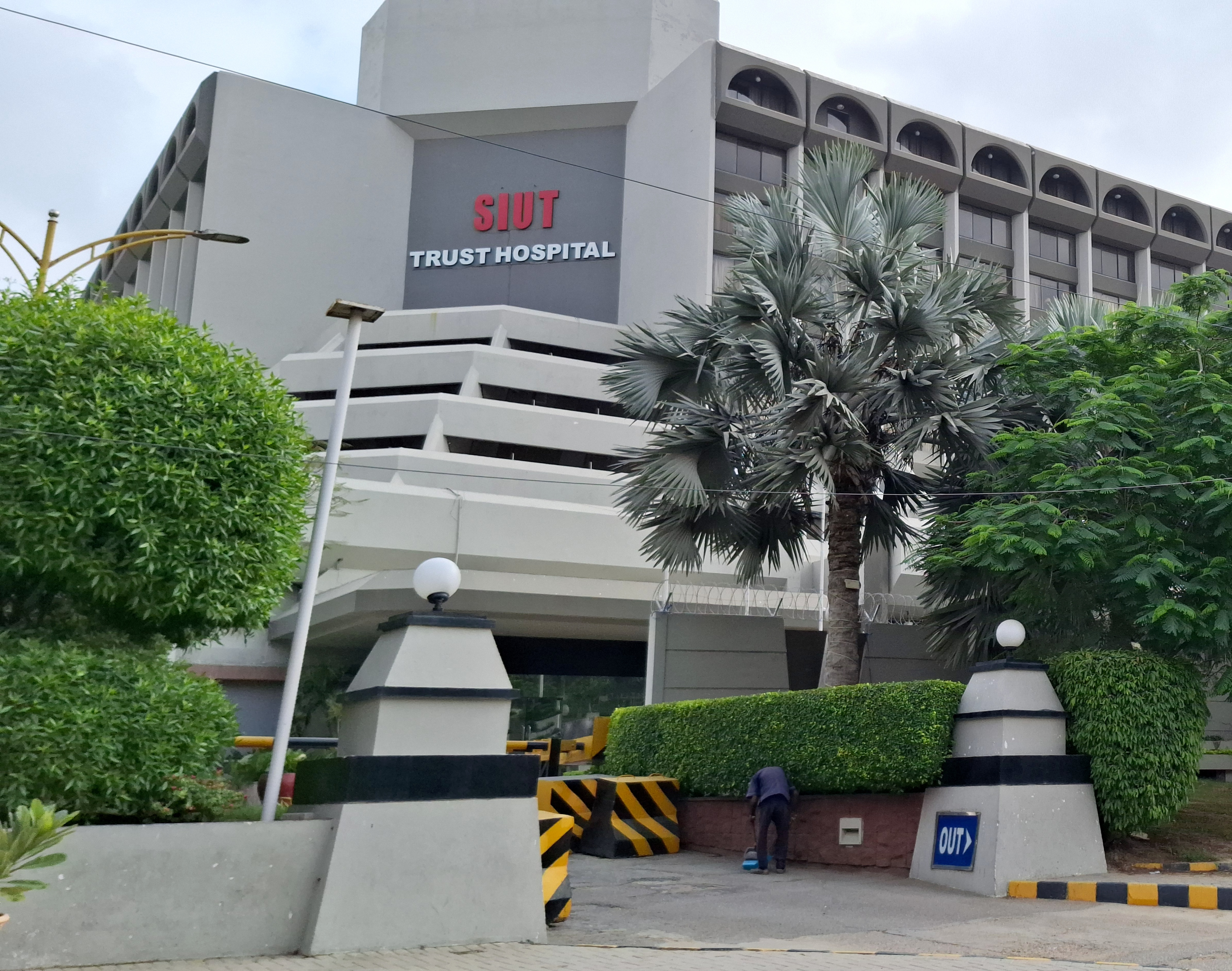
SIUT Trust Hospital in Karachi

In 2024, SIUT acquired a four-star Pakistani hotel, Regent Plaza Hotel, to convert it into a health care facility. The Regent Plaza hotel was located on Shahrah-e-Faisal, consisting an plot area of 13,200 square yards, with construction having a total covered area of 47,034 square yards. SIUT acquired the Regent Plaza from Pakistan Hotels Developers Limited for PKR 14.5 billion.

== See also ==
- Adeebul Hasan Rizvi
- Ghulam Muhammad Mahar Medical College
