= Indus Hospital and Health Network =

Hospital in Karachi, Pakistan

Indus Hospital & Health Network انڈس ہسپتال اور ہیلتھ نیٹ ورک

- Location of Indus Hospital in Sindh, Pakistan Indus Hospital (Pakistan)

Geography
- Location: Korangi, Karachi, Sindh, Pakistan, Karachi, Sindh, Pakistan
- Coordinates: 24°51′14″N 67°07′05″E

Organisation
- Care system: Private Sector hospital

Services
- Emergency department: Yes

History
- Founded: 2007

Links
- Website: www.indushospital.org.pk

Indus Hospital and Health Network (IHHN) (Urdu: انڈس ہسپتال اور ہیلتھ نیٹ ورک) is a non-profit organization comprising a nationwide healthcare network of primary, secondary, and tertiary healthcare facilities across Pakistan. IHHN offers healthcare services to all patients completely free of cost.

== History ==
It was established in 2005 when Islamic Mission Trust (Founded by Dr Nazir Kazi) donated its non-functional hospital in Korangi, Karachi to Indus Hospital and Health Network. Islamic Mission Trust Hospital was originally established in 1988. When it started, it was Pakistan's first paperless and cashless hospital; the hospital has an e-cardiology system.

IHHN comprises 12 hospitals, four regional blood centers, four physical rehab centers, a Pediatric Oncology Center reputed to be the largest in Pakistan, 36 Primary Care offerings, and conducts public health initiatives.

Indus Hospital and Health Network includes the Indus University of Health Sciences, the Indus Hospital Research Center, and a Postgraduate Medical Education Program in its ambit. It is accredited by the College of Physicians and Surgeons of Pakistan.

== Services ==
- Emergency Services
- Medicine & Allied Services
- Anesthesiology & Surgical Intensive Care
- Surgery & Allied Services
- Pediatric Services
- Clinical Laboratory Services
- Radiology & Imaging Services
