= Civil Hospital Karachi =

Hospital in Karachi

Organisation
- Care system: Public Sector hospital
- Affiliated university: Dow University of Health Sciences, Karachi

Links
- Website: chk.gov.pk

Civil Hospital Karachi (Urdu: سول ہسپتال), officially known as Dr. Ruth K. M. Pfau Civil Hospital Karachi, is a 1,900-bed tertiary care public hospital that imparts both undergraduate and postgraduate teaching and training.

It is one of the teaching hospitals affiliated with the Dow University of Health Sciences, Karachi.

== Recognition ==
- Accredited by the College of Physicians and Surgeons of Pakistan.

== History ==
Dr. Ruth K.M. Pfau Hospital originally The Civil Hospital Karachi was established in 1854 and was expanded in 1898 in the wake of a third pandemic of Bubonic Plague on the one hand, and the diamond jubilee of Queen Victoria on the other. The pandemic would kill at least an estimated 10 million people in India alone over a period of 20 years. It is important to mention the status of Karachi at that time. Karachi was not the business center. Towards the close of the nineteenth century, Karachi emerged as the cleanest city towards this side of the Indus River, with an estimated population of 105,000 which continued to grow in view of its strategic importance. Lord Curzon the Viceroy of India visited the hospital in 1900 and unveiled a commemorative plaque to mark the platinum jubilee of Queen Victoria. The plaque is placed in the same spot, which was initially a nursing school and subsequently transformed into a state-of-the-art Burns Center in what is known till today as the Victoria Block or the Jubilee Block, while the entire building is heritage-protected by the provincial Department of Culture allowing for repairs and renovation but eschewing any structural change in its original design. The hospital continued to function efficiently until independence as the principal hospital of Karachi and received tremendous impetus after 1945 when the then Governor of Sindh Sir Hugh Dow transferred the medical school provisionally recognized by the Bombay University from Hyderabad to Karachi and laid the foundation of the Dow Medical College in its present location on 10 December 1945, with the Dr. Ruth K.M. Pfau Hospital attached to it as a teaching hospital. The creation of a new state of Pakistan brought with it the need for a massive relief and rehabilitation efforts for hundreds of thousands of migrated people pouring in from India and addressing all their basic needs including health needs through a largely inadequate and unprepared system. A visitor's book maintained during the late fifties and early sixties indicates that Dr. Ruth K.M. Pfau Hospital was frequented by several dignitaries such as government ministers, ambassadors and eminent personalities visiting Pakistan. A 1961 entry by Lady Bird Johnson then spouse of the Vice President of the USA is particularly revealing: It reads: "This has been a visit both heart-breaking and rewarding. My hat is off to you women doctors!".

=== Trauma Centre ===
The hospital includes the 500 bed Benazir Bhutto Accident, Emergency and Trauma Centre that includes a total of 18 operating rooms.

== Departments ==
The clinical departments of the hospital include Internal Medicine, Gynaecology and Obstetrics, Anesthesiology, Pediatrics, Cardiac Surgery, Oncology, Radiology, General Surgery, Neuro Surgery and Laboratory the hospital is proving all the services and facilities in one premise. The first state-of-the-art Burns unit has also been established in this hospital. The department of surgery comprises six general surgical units besides the specialties of neurosurgery, paediatric surgery, orthopedic surgery, urology, vascular surgery, maxillo-facial surgery and plastic surgery. The department of medicine comprises five general medicine units, 60 beds each. Other specialties includes Cardiology, Psychiatry, Dermatology, Neurology and Nephrology. The Department of Paediatrics has three units with a DTU (Diarrhea Treatment Unit). The Department of Gynaecology and Obstetrics is divided into three units, having facilities of labour room and Operation Theatre. The Emergency department has several sections including an Operation Theatre and Surgical Intensive Care Unit, which are functional around the clock for use in case of mass disasters.

== Hospital renamed ==
On 19 August 2017, after the state funeral of German-born Pakistani nun Ruth Pfau, Sindh Chief Minister Syed Murad Ali Shah ordered to rename The Civil Hospital, Karachi to Dr. Ruth K.M. Pfau Civil Hospital as an acknowledgment of "selfless services of the late social servant". She was also widely known as Pakistan's Mother Teresa. Since 1960, Ruth Pfau had devoted her life to eradicating leprosy in Pakistan.
