= Tuberculosis control programme of Khyber Pakhtunkhwa =

Pakistani provincial health campaign

The Tuberculosis control programme of Khyber Pakhtunkhwa is a programme established by the health department of Khyber Pakhtunkhwa with the intent of eradicating tuberculosis in the province. Its initial duration was five years, from 2000 to 2005. It was extended with foreign aid through 2008, then continued through 2009 and later through 2012. In 2023, coordinators of the programme worked with Mercy Corps to establish programmes to help eradicate TB across 120 districts in Pakistan. As of 2025, Khyber Pakhtunkhwa had 234 units diagnosing tuberculosis, and TB patients received free treatment.

== Tuberculosis in Khyber Pakhtunkhwa ==
The detection rate of cases in 2016 in the province was 57%. By 2020, the detection had fallen to 40%. In 2025, an estimated 58,000–59,000 cases of tuberculosis were reported to health officials in the province of the more than 100,000 known cases.

A USAID-backed study from January to September 2021 found that 153 samples from patients showed the drug-resistant strains of tuberculosis. Treating one patient with such a strain can cost up to ₨1,000,000.

== About the programme ==
Programme Mission is TB free Khyber-Pakhtunkhwa. Programme goal is to reduce TB prevalence & death rates by 50% by 2015 relative to 1990. Implementation target is to detect at least 70% of new sputum smear positive cases and cure at least 90% of these cases.

GTZ provided technical assistance.

The program used a mix of public and private funds, with KfW as the private financier, with the partnership ending in August 2015.

In September 2013, the programme reported an 88% treatment success rate. Secretary of Health Ghulam Qadir Khan stated that the treatment success rate by the end of 2013 had increased to 94%. The program had treated more than 800,000 patients by April 2025.

== TB Surveillance System in Khyber-Pakhtunkhwa ==
TB Control Programme, Khyber-Pakhtunkhwa is the only programme which has its own web based Electronic Recording and Reporting System. It is the case based recording system which provides access to every patient's record and to monitor performance of each BMU and district. It was developed in last quarter of 2009 with financial support from AGEG-KfW and was launched in 1st quarter of 2010.

The basic objective was to have a system which can help to generate error free report and to strengthen the TB surveillance system. TB Control Programme, KP was maintaining TB data in MS Excel Files since 2002 which was holding data collected from districts and consolidating to generate province report but the quality of the data was always in question and chances of errors were high because of manual collection and generation of reports by the district TB control officers.

Introduction of ERS addressed many issues. Now DOTS facilitator at district TB control office enter TB patient's data from TB03 register just like he/she enter it in TB03 itself, the system records it along with its follow-up data and generate WHO standard reports at the end of each quarter. Also it performs analysis on the reports to show the progress and performance of the BMU, District and Province. With the help of ERS district TB control officer and provincial TB control authority can access and monitor the data of patients registered in periphery.

TB control programme upgraded their system in January, 2011. Keeping in view the feed backs from the districts. The system has the capacity to be upgraded further and new features can be introduced to strengthen it more, it can be attached to increase its scope to other TB related activities and to help TB management staff by getting quality data in real time.

== Sources ==
- "Experts discuss TB control programme". The Nation. 2 September 2013.
- "Health: 1.5m TB cases put Pakistan at 8th among 22 high-burden countries". Balochistan Times. 5 July 2010 – via The Free Library.
- "Over 100,000 new TB cases emerge in KP every year". The News International (Press release). 22 April 2025.
- "Welcome to ERS TB Control Programme, Khyber-Pakhtunkhwa". TB Control Programme, Khyber-Pakhtunkhwa. Archived from the original on 21 February 2020.
- "World Tuberculosis Day: Control targets achieved but eradication requires more, health officials". The Express Tribune (Press release). 25 March 2014.
- Ali, C. (25 March 2025). "Khyber Pakhtunkhwa ramps up efforts to eliminate Tuberculosis". Associated Press of Pakistan (Press release).
- Farooq, Ulmer (23 March 2015). "World Tuberculosis Day: TB programme at risk as financier to pack-up soon". The Express Tribune.
- Shaikh, Babar Tasneem; Lahari, Ahmed Khan; Durrani, Sulaiman; Chaudhry, Alina; Ali, Nabeela (9 April 2022). "Supporting tuberculosis program in active contact tracing: a case study from Pakistan". Infectious Diseases of Poverty. 11 (1): 42. doi:10.1186/s40249-022-00965-1. PMC 8994270. PMID 35397556.
- Zafar, Tuba (20 October 2023). "TB Control Program KP Committed to Eradicate TB from the Province". Pakistan News International.
