= Health in Pakistan =

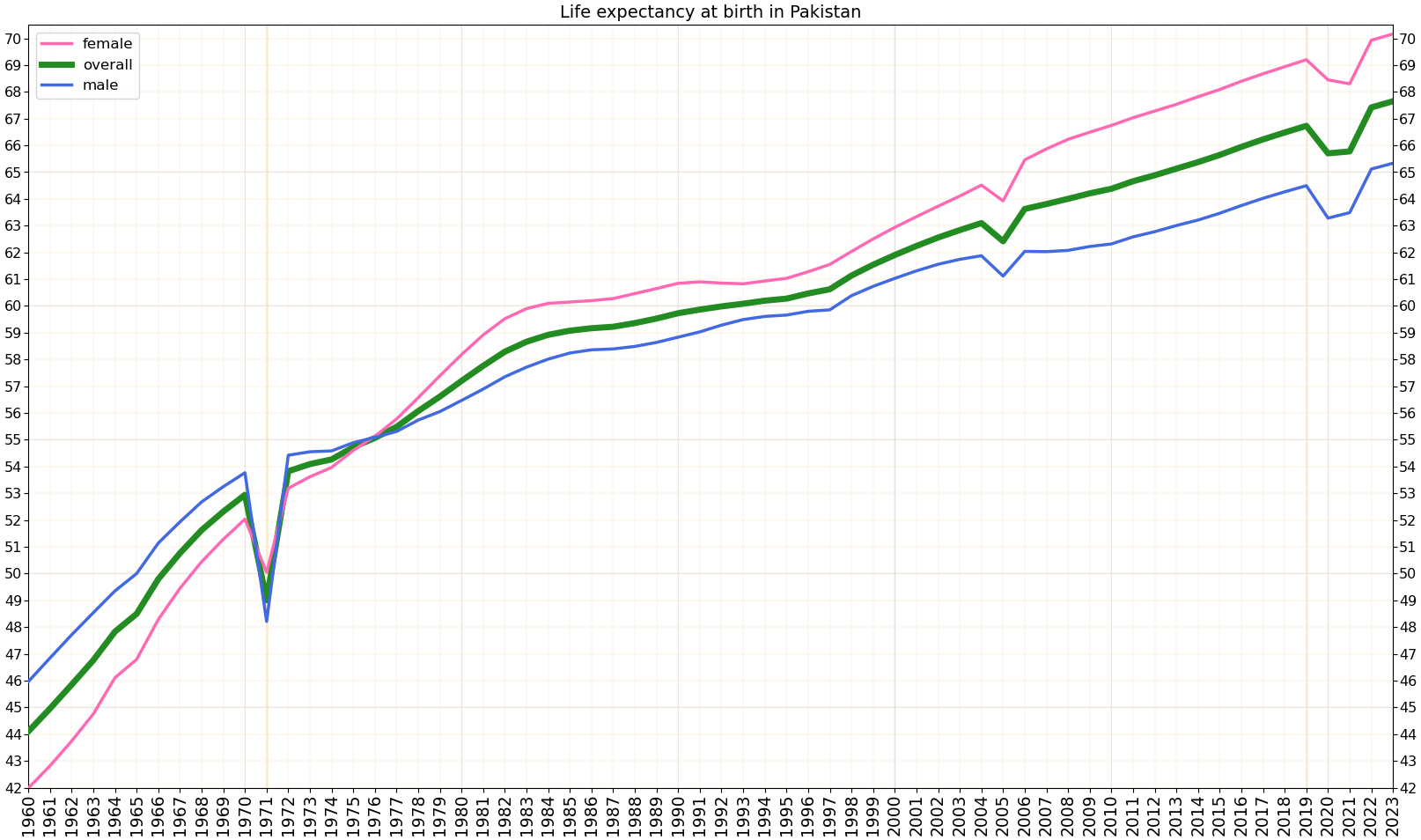
Life expectancy in Pakistan

Pakistan is the fifth most populous country in the world with population approaching 225 million. It is a developing country struggling in many domains due to which the health system has suffered a lot. As a result of that, Pakistan is ranked 122nd out of 190 countries in the World Health Organization performance report.

Life expectancy in Pakistan increased from 61.1 years in 1990 to 65.9 in 2019 and is currently 67.94 in 2024 . Pakistan ranked 124th among 195 countries in terms of Healthcare Access and Quality index, according to a Lancet study. Although Pakistan has seen improvement in healthcare access and quality since 1990, with its HAQ index increasing from 26.8 in 1990 to 37.6 in 2016. It still stands at 164th out of 188 countries in terms of United Nations Sustainable Development Goals and chance to achieve them by 2030.

According to latest statistics, Pakistan spends 2.95% of its GDP on health (2020). Pakistan per capita income (PPP current international $,) is 6.437.2 in 2022 and the current health expenditure per capita (current US$) is 38.18. The total adult literacy rate in Pakistan is 58% (2019) and primary school enrollment is 68%(2018). The gender inequality in Pakistan was 0.534 in 2021 and ranks the country 135 out of 170 countries in 2021. The proportion of population which has access to improved drinking water and sanitation is 91% (2015) and 64% (15) respectively.

The Human Rights Measurement Initiative finds that Pakistan is fulfilling 69.2% of what it should be fulfilling for the right to health based on its level of income. When looking at the right to health with respect to children, Pakistan achieves 82.9% of what is expected based on its current income. In regards to the right to health amongst the adult population, the country achieves 90.4% of what is expected based on the nation's level of income. Pakistan falls into the "very bad" category when evaluating the right to reproductive health because the nation is fulfilling only 34.4% of what the nation is expected to achieve based on the resources (income) it has available.

== Health infrastructure ==
Pakistan has a mixed health system, which includes government infrastructure, para-statal health system, private sector, civil society and philanthropic contributors. Alternative and traditional system of healing is also quite popular in Pakistan.

The country undertook a major constitutional reform in 2011 with the 18th amendment, which resulted in abolishment of Ministry of Health and subsequent devolution of powers.As a result, more powers were given to provinces regarding health infrastructure and finances. In keeping with the increased awareness regarding health services Ministry of National Health Services, Regulations and Coordination was formed in 2011. The main purpose of establishing this body was to provide a health system that gives access to efficient, equitable, accessible & affordable health services. And also, national and international coordination in the field of public health along with population welfare coordination. It also enforced drug laws and regulations. The health care delivery system includes both state and non-state; and profit and not for profit service provision. The country's health sector is marked by urban-rural disparities in healthcare delivery and an imbalance in the health workforce, with insufficient health managers, nurses, paramedics and skilled birth attendants in the peripheral areas. Health care challenges in Pakistan also include issues such as inadequate budgetary allocation, shortage of medical professionals, substandard physical infrastructure, rapid population growth, counterfeit and expensive medicines, shortage of paramedical personnel and presence of unlicensed practitioners.

Sources of health expenditure in Pakistan was mostly "out-of-pocket" spending around 66% followed by the Government health spending at 22.1% in 2005.The situation has improved slightly now with out-of-pocket spending estimated to be 54.3% in 2020 followed by Government health spending of 35.6%.

=== Primary Health Care ===
Primary Healthcare system is the health system for providing care. Primary healthcare in Pakistan mainly consists of health units, dispensaries, maternal & child health centers and some private clinics at community level. In Sindh (Province in Pakistan), Primary healthcare activities are supported by government itself but managed by external private & non-government organizations like People's primary healthcare initiative, Shifa foundation, HANDS etc. Pakistan has an outreach primary health care, delivered at the community level by 100,000 Lady Health Workers and an increasing number of community midwives, among other community based workers.

=== Secondary Health Care ===
It mainly includes tehsil & district hospitals or some private hospitals. Tehsil & district hospitals (THQs & DHQs) are run by the government, the treatment under government hospitals is free of cost.

=== Tertiary Health Care ===
It include both private and government hospitals, well equipped to perform minor and major surgeries. There are usually two or more in every city. Most of the Class "A" military hospitals come in this category. Healthcare and stay comes free of charge in government hospitals. There is also a 24 hours emergency care that usually caters to more than 350 patients every day.

=== Other health related services ===
The government of Pakistan has also started "Sehat Sahulat Program", whose vision is to work towards social welfare reforms, guaranteeing that the lower class within the country gets access to basic medical care without financial risks. Apart from that there are also maternal and child health centres run by lady health workers that aim towards family planning and reproductive health.

== Communicable Diseases in Pakistan: Trends and Challenge ==
Infectious diseases remain one of the biggest threats to health care in Pakistan, and are considered a major challenge in the field of medicine. Some of the reasons for the growth of these diseases include; high population density, limited medical facilities, poor hygiene, little or no hygiene awareness. It is even worse in Pakistan due to geographical position, political instability and social inequity, more so low health care access in the face of increasing inequality especially in rural settings.

The Government together with health-related organizations of the world has tried to rein diseases like polio, TB, malaria among others, but the country still experiences recurring cases in diseases like dengue fever, hepatitis, HIV/AIDS among others. The continuous pandemic of COVID-19 has taxed the already fragile health sector in Pakistan especially in the rural settings where it is difficult to estimate the exact incidence of the disease and the proportion of the population with limited access to the health services. In addition, the prevalence of resistant microorganisms or simply the concept of antimicrobial resistance (AMR) adds a new layer of difficulties in managing many infections. In this article, the author seeks to review the trends of major communicable diseases in Pakistan, outline the gaps of data availability and despite a plenty of literature available on research articles, the author points out that there are specific areas which lacks information on this topic and it clearly points out the issues faced by the country in dealing with these disease burdens.

Disease	Estimated deaths per year	Additional information
Tuberculosis	27000	Pakistan is a high TB burden country, reporting around 510,000 new cases annually.
Malaria	50000	Rural areas during monsoons report high death rates
HIV-AIDS	3000	Significant rise, during the 2019 outbreak in Sindh.
COVID-19	Over 30,000 deaths	Deaths peaked in 2020-2021

- 1. Tuberculosis (TB)
- Trends: Currently, Pakistan is one of the five high TB burden countries in the global level. The magnitude of TB in Pakistan is considered to be around 510,000 new incidences per annum, although the proportions of MDR-TB have also been identified. Tuberculosis is most widely spread in urban areas and developing countries characterized by high population density, poor sanitation and restricted access to health care services.
- Challenges: One of the major issues that affect TB control in Pakistan is reporting of the disease especially because it is stigmatized and there are few diagnostic centers, especially in the rural areas. MDR-TB has been identified as a potential problem with new recommendations in cases where treatment regimens are not fully administered, patients do not continue their follow-ups and medication supply is irregular. It evident that overall disease prevalence is much higher than recorded especially in the rural areas in Baluchistan and in Khyber Pakhtunkhwa province due to barriers to timely diagnosis and treatment.
- 2. Malaria
- Trends: Malaria is still prevalent in many areas and more prevalent in the province of Sindh, Baluchistan and KP. Based on the recent studies, Pakistan has reported more than 300000 confirmed malaria cases every year with variation and comparatively high incidence during monsoon period that is June to September. Transmission is higher in the rural areas mainly because of stagnant water which favours breeding of the Anopheles mosquito.
- Challenges: This is especially so since a large number of the malaria patients in the rural areas present themselves to health facilities which are inadequately equipped or staffed to diagnose the diseases appropriately. Furthermore, the national Malaria control strategies for example by the use of insecticide treated nets face challenges of accessibility because some of the regions in the country are not easily accessible. There is a possibility that actual extent of Malaria is way higher than is currently reported because the statistics may not be enough.
- 3. Dengue Fever
- Trends. Dengue fever has emerged as an epidemic problem in Pakistan and after the main outbreak in different cities like Karachi, Lahore Islamabad. The country went to see a major outbreak in dengue cases in 2023 with cases recorded crossed over 75,000. Dengue is a serious disease in regions that experience a lot of rain especially during a specific period in the year; this is due to inadequate drainage systems and increased population density in urban areas.
- Challenges: Majority of dengue incidents are reported in urban areas, as a result of poor handling of wastes, accumulation of water and relatively poor influence of urban authorities over breeding sites. No detailed information is available regarding the temporal distribution of dengue in rural areas while it is estimated that isolated cases occur but remain unreported. Moreover, studies have shown that in times of outbreak, the health infrastructure is usually overstretched in affected cities such that hospitals are unable to deal with the numbers of people seeking health care, especially if the outbreak happens during the monsoon season.
- 4. Polio
- Trends: Intensive efforts have been made throughout the world to end poliomyelitis; however, wild poliovirus has never been stopped in Pakistan. In 2022, there were 20 incidences of polio, nonetheless the virus poses a threat to the society specially in Khyber Pakhtunkhwa and Baluchistan where vaccination coverage is low.
- Challenges: There are several barriers to the polio and among them are vaccine hesitancy and misinformation. Violence related insecurity crises in some of the regions has also been another factor discouraging the fight against polio. While vaccination has improved in the urban areas the rural areas continue to have low coverage due to restricted access and conflict.
- 5. HIV/AIDS
- Trends: HIV/AIDS specific incidents have increased in the last decade and till 2021, Pakistan estimated had about 190000 people living with this disease. It is most common among the key affected population groups such as the IDPs, males having sex with males, and the transgender people. Pakistan also saw a massive HIV outbreak in Larkana, Sindh in 2019 in which more than 500 children contracted the virus from unsafe medical practices.
- Challenges: There are challenges such as stigma and lack of adequate health services especially in rural Pakistan with regard to HIV epidemic. There is little and limited data available on HIV incidence and trends in regional and other more distant areas. A large number of people remain ignorant about the ways they can transmit and get infected with HIV hence its spread is rife. There is also another important piece of evidence of a major deficiency in diagnostic and treatment services for affected populations.
- 6. Hepatitis
- Trends: According to data, Pakistan lays in top ten list of world countries affected with Hepatitis B and Hepatitis C and it is assumed that 10-15 percent population of the country is suffering from it, that is 15-20 million people. Non-sterilization of syringes as well as giving out transfusion of blood without conducting tests are some of the reasons why hepatitis spreads in health facilities. Transmission rates are high in the rural areas where the health systems are not vibrant and radio/TV health education is little
- Challenges: Because there are few health centres in the villages and there is need for people and especially those in the rural areas to be sensitized on the common diseases that befalls them including hepatitis. Measures to practice safe injections and screening have been put in place but such practices are not always observed. In addition, low-income earners cannot afford the costs of treatment hence the disease continues to spread.
- 7. COVID-19
- Trends: The outbreak of COVID-19 put significant pressure on Pakistan's health care sector which was already in a very vulnerable position. Pakistan Benefits Over 1 million Citizens by 2024: The government of Pakistan stated more than 1 million citizens' benefit in analysis of performance year 2024. 6 million of COVID-19 cases, the government launched vaccination campaigns that thus far targeted 76% of the target electorate. However, vaccine hesitancy and inadequate health access in the rural areas have been a challenge to the mass endeavour.
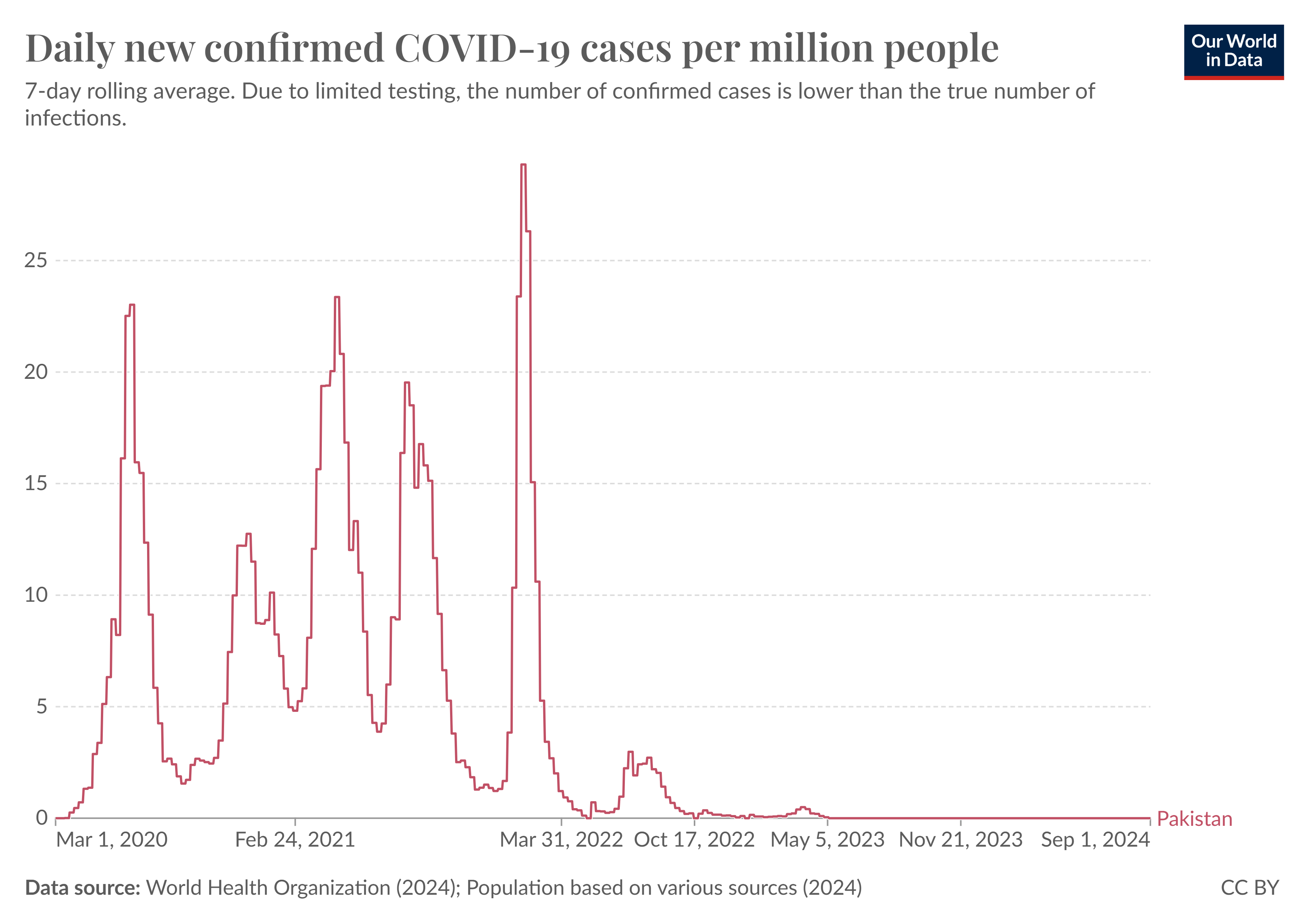
  Daily new confirmed COVID 19 cases per million people
- Challenges: COVID-19 response in Pakistan is heinous due to haphazard and untimely lock downs, bed shortage, too less tests, and most of all lack of basic healthcare facilities in far flung areas. Of note is that the government has concentrated COVID-19 testing and vaccination services in the urban centres while the rural regions remain poorly served, which partly explains the underrepresentation and the lack of data.
- Where Information is Scarce
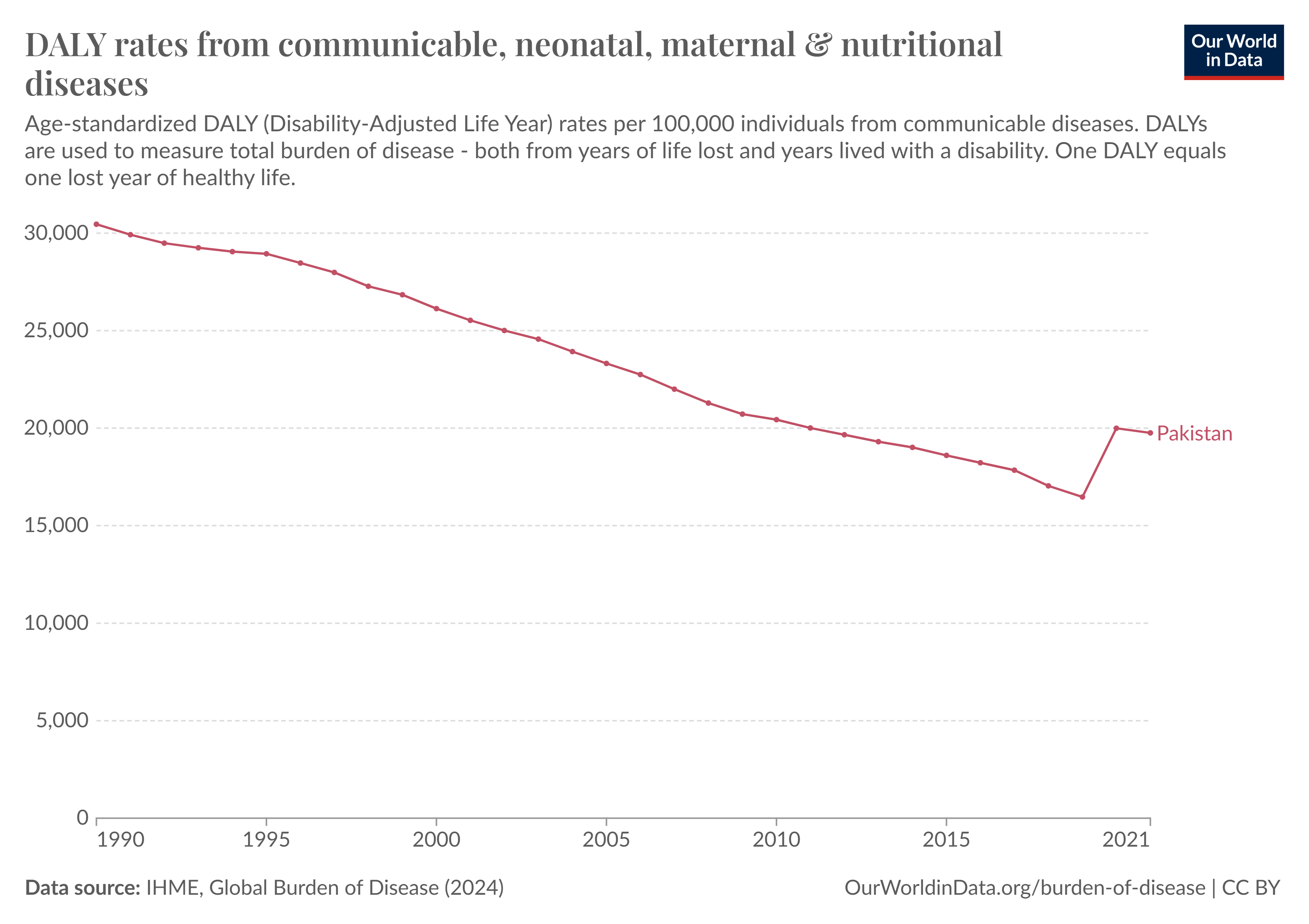
  DALYs
- 1. Rural-Urban Divide: Currently, health facilities and information in the rural areas do not compare to that of the urban areas. It is quite evident that large cities like Karachi and Lahore offer better health care facilities and data management as compared to rural areas especially in Baluchistan, Khyber Pakhtunkhwa and Gilgit Baltistan where health care facilities are scarce and data collection is also a major concern.
- 2. Socioeconomic Impact: Presently, detailed studies have not been conducted in establishing the economic effect of communicable diseases on the low-income households in Pakistan. It explained how communicable diseases are costly because of the medical expenditure during the disease and the productivity that is lost during a disease incident.
- 3. Antimicrobial Resistance (AMR): As mentioned earlier there is little information available on antimicrobial resistance in Pakistan except of TB related MDR-TB. Antibiotic consumption either in rural or urban settings is further contributing to the development of AMR while investigations and data on the scenario is still limited.
- Opinion The challenges which contribute in increasing the burden of communicable diseases in Pakistan are socio-economic and healthcare related factors. While some diseases like polio and TB have been crippled, diseases like dengue, hepatitis, HIV and many others are still rife. There exists inadequate information as well as restricted access to efficient health care especially in the rural areas which hampers disease control. In the future, the country of Pakistan has to devote itself to the development of healthcare system improvement, increasing the availability of education in public health sector, and increasing data gathering so as to address the gaps in combating diseases

Noncommunicable diseases

Mental health disorders and injuries cause morbidity and mortality in Pakistan. They account for 58% of all deaths in the country. Pakistan has the sixth highest number of people in the world with diabetes; every fourth adult is overweight or obese; cigarettes are cheap; antismoking and road safety laws are poorly enforced. Pakistan has a high prevalence of blindness, with nearly 1% by WHO criteria for visual impairment – mainly due to cataract. Disability from blindness profoundly affects poverty, education and overall quality of life.

=== Controllable diseases ===
- Cholera: As of 2006, there were a total of 4,610 cases of suspected cholera. However, the floods of 2010 suggested that cholera transmission may be more prevalent than previously understood. Furthermore, research from the Aga Khan University suggests that cholera may account for a quarter of all childhood diarrhea in some parts of rural Sindh.
- Dengue fever: The first case of Dengue fever was reported in the country in 1994 but it was not until 2005 that outbreak patterns started appearing. Since then, dengue has become endemic in the country. An outbreak of dengue fever occurred in October 2006 in Pakistan. Several deaths occurred due to misdiagnosis, late treatment and lack of awareness in the local population. But overall, steps were taken to kill vectors for the fever and the disease was controlled later, with minimal casualties.During the dengue epidemic of 2011, Dengue Expert Advisory Group (DEAG) was formed in province of Punjab aiming to control dengue in the province. Along with several campaigns like "Dengue Mukao" (End Dengue) were initiated for public awareness in the province in local languages. According to the National Institute of Health (NIH) Islamabad, 22,938 dengue fever cases were reported in Pakistan in 2017, and about 3,442 cases in 2020. A total of 48,906 cases including 183 deaths were reported in the country from 1 January to 25 November 2021. Several factors like irrational urbanization, climate changes, insufficient waste management system, lack of awareness and effective vaccine, all play role in making Pakistan vulnerable to dengue outbreaks.
- Measles: Pakistan reported about 28,573 cases of measles in 1980 which decreased down to about 2,064 in 2000.After 2010 flooding in Pakistan, there was an approximate twofold increase in reported Measles cases from 4,321 in 2010 to 8,749 in 2013.There was total of 8,378 cases of measles reported in 2022. Currently Pakistan is on number 3 among top 10 countries with measles outbreak in the world. Missed immunization along with malnutrition particularly Vitamin A deficiency contribute towards morbidity and mortality of measles in Pakistan.
- Meningococcal meningitis: As of 2006, there were a total of 724 suspected cases of Meningococcal meningitis.

=== Poliomyelitis ===
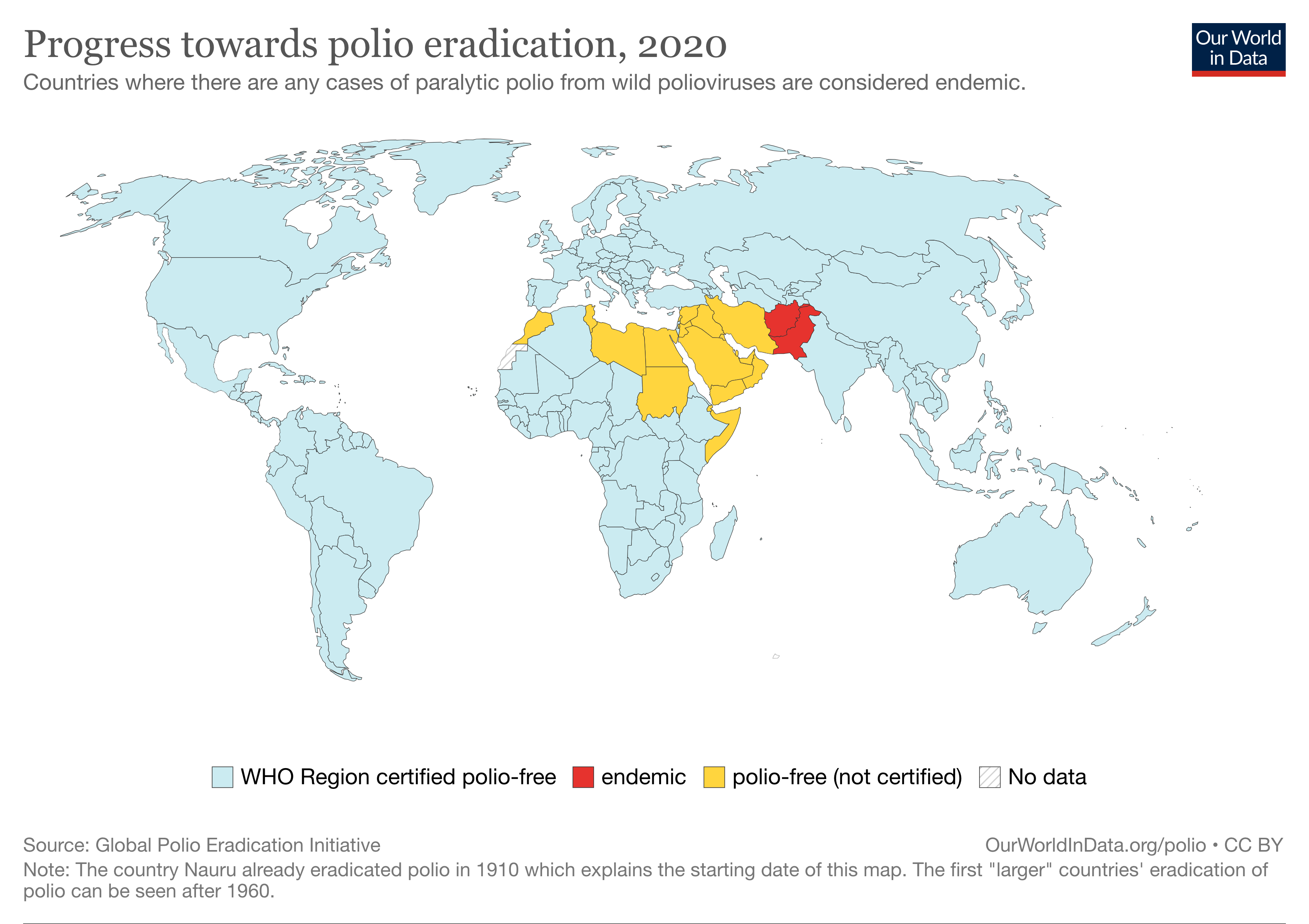
World map showing progress towards polio eradication, 2020

Pakistan is one of the two countries in which poliomyelitis has not been eradicated. As of 2023, Pakistan and Afghanistan are the only two countries remaining in the world where wild poliovirus type 1 remains endemic. There were a total of 89 reported cases of polio in 2008 which decreased to 9 in 2018. There has been total of two cases reported in 2023 so far.Both of these cases were reported in Bannu District of Khyber Pakhtunkhwa Province (KPK).

Pakistan Polio Eradication Initiative (PEI) National Emergency Action Plan (NEAP) 2021-2023 was launched in 2021 in line with GPEI Polio Eradication Strategy 2022–2026.It goal is to permanently interrupt all poliovirus transmission in Pakistan by the end of 2023.

World Health Organization (WHO) Director General Dr Tedros Adhanom Ghebreyesus said "Pakistan also needs to stop transmission of the virus from Afghanistan. Our New Year's wish is 'zero' polio by end of 2019. The children of Pakistan and the children of the world deserve nothing less. Failure to eradicate polio would result in global resurgence of the disease, with as many as 200,000 new cases every year, all over the world."

=== HIV/AIDS ===
HIV infections have been on the rise since 1987. The former National AIDS Control Programme (it was developed with the Health Ministry) and the UNAIDS states that there are an estimated 97,000 HIV positive individuals in Pakistan. However, these figures are based on dated opinions and inaccurate assumptions; and are inconsistent with available national surveillance data which suggest that the overall number may closer to 40,000. From 25 April through 28 June 2019, 30,192 people were screened for HIV, of which 876 were positive.

=== Cancer ===
According to latest studies, following five cancers are most prevalent in Pakistan: breast cancer (24.1%), oral cavity (9.6%), colorectum (4.9%), esophagus (4.2%), and liver cancer (3.9%).Most deaths were reported due to breast cancer in Pakistan. Pakistan has the highest rate of Breast Cancer among all Asian countries as approximately 90000 new cases are diagnosed every year out of which 40000 die. Young women usually present at advanced stage of breast cancer, which has negative effect on prognosis. Oral cavity and gastrointestinal cancers continue to be extremely common in both genders. Lung and prostate cancer are comparatively less common. Ovarian cancer also has high prevalence.

=== Diabetes ===
According to WHO, "Diabetes is a chronic, metabolic disease characterised by elevated levels of blood glucose (or blood sugar), which leads over time to serious damage to the heart, blood vessels, eyes, kidneys and nerves." There are two main types of diabetes as type 1 and type 2. In type 1 diabetes The body's immune system attacks the insulin-producing cells in the pancreas, leading to little or no insulin production. While type 2 diabetes which more common, is caused when the body doesn't produce enough insulin or becomes resistant to it, often due to lifestyle factors like poor diet and inactivity. The most common is type 2 diabetes, which usually occurs in adults, when body becomes resistant to insulin or does not produce enough insulin.Type 1 diabetes is called juvenile or insulin dependent diabetes which mostly occurs in young where pancreas produces little or no new insulin. In past years, prevalence of type 2 diabetes has significantly increased. For most of the people with diabetes, insulin is the most effective treatment.Some of the factors that predispose individuals to diabetes are; high blood pressure, high cholesterol, smoking, sedentary lifestyle, intake of processed foods and sugars, lack of physical activity and obesity.

Pakistan has one of the highest rates of diabetes in the world. According to International Diabetes Federation (IDF), as of 2021, it is estimated that there are 33 million people living with type 2 diabetes in Pakistan; the third largest diabetes population globally. An additional 11 million adults in Pakistan have impaired glucose tolerance, while approximately 8·9 million people with diabetes remain undiagnosed. Data on long-term complications among people with diabetes in Pakistan are limited. According to the International Diabetes Federation, in 2022, 26.7% of adults in Pakistan are affected by diabetes making the total number of cases approximately 33,000,000. Disease burden due to diabetes in Pakistan has increased significantly from contributing to 1.13 million DALYs in 1990 to 4.08 million DALYs in 2021 respectively.

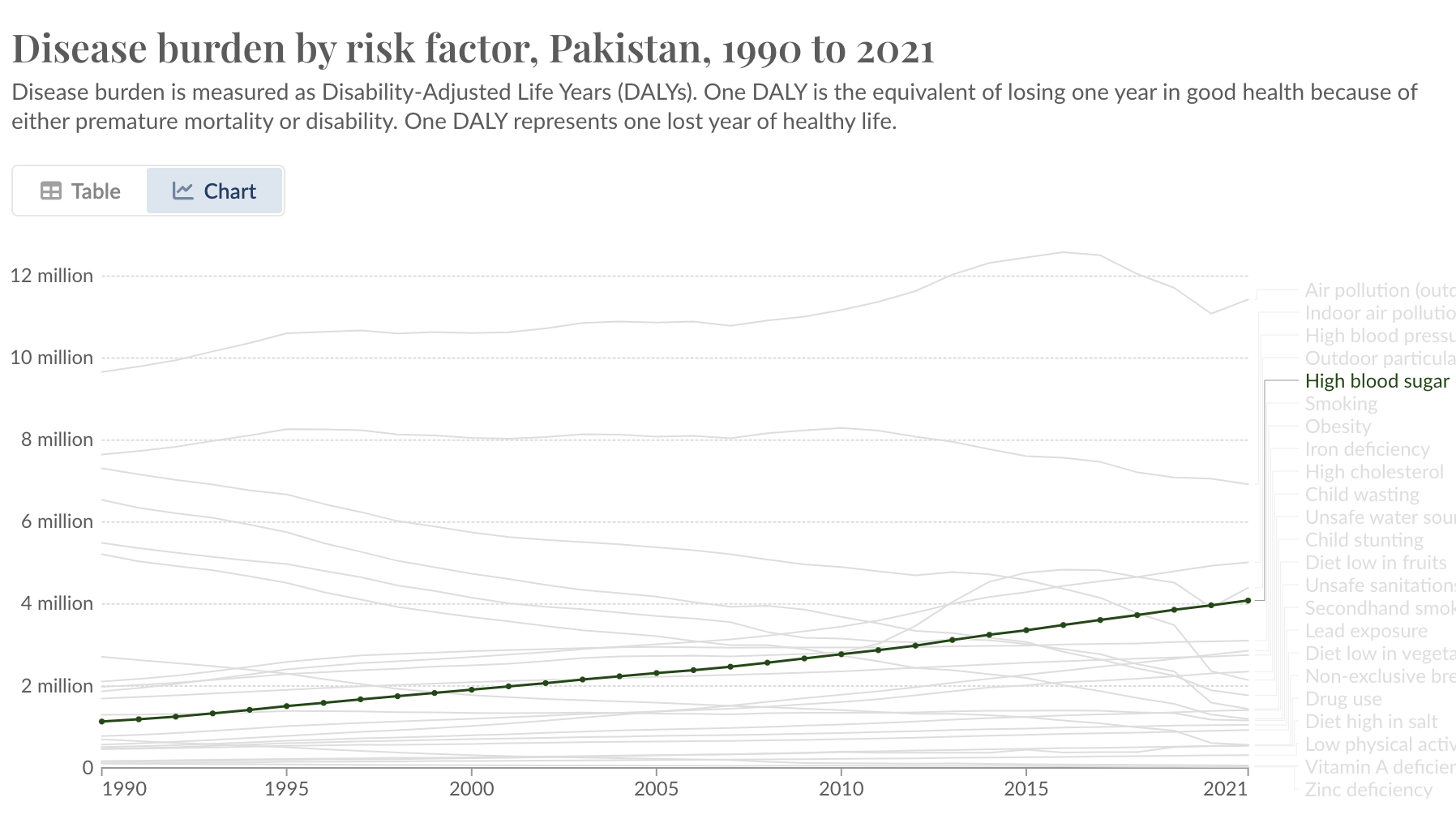
Disease Burden by Risk Factor (Diabetes)

==== Diabetes-Mortality rate ====
According to World Health Organisation, in 2020, there were 400,000 deaths due to diabetes and elevated blood glucose level. This high mortality rate due to diabetes is attributed to delayed diagnosis, its management and insufficient access to healthcare services.

==== Challenges and Impact ====
Lack of healthcare access, awareness and poor management are among the major contributors to disease burden, specially in rural areas. A study from the Journal of Pakistan Medical Association (JPMA) stated that only 35% of people with diabetes in the country receive regular medical care, while many remained undiagnosed due to a lack of awareness. Additionally, insulin and other essential diabetic medications are often too expensive for low-income populations, leading to poor disease control and management, further leading to complications such as cardiovascular diseases, diabetic retinopathy, and kidney diseases.

Pakistan being a rapidly developing nation, gets a lot of burden on healthcare system. According to this study, "The Economic Burden of Type 2 Diabetes Mellitus in Pakistan: A Cost of Illness Study" which shows in-depth examination of the economic impact of Type 2 diabetes in Pakistan, the average total annual cost per patient is estimated at USD 235.1 (with a median of USD 162.8). Of these expenses, 93.2% are direct medical costs, 5.3% are direct non-medical costs, and 1.5% are indirect costs.

==== Diabetes Care Strategies ====
Currently, primary healthcare system is able to detect only around 10% to 20% of the estimated cases of Type 2 diabetes. There should be more emphasis on primary and also secondary healthcare system in order to diagnose and control the disease. National Action Plan for Non-communicable Disease Prevention, Control and Health Promotion in Pakistan (NAP-NCD) is an effort being carried out to prevent and control the incidence of diabetes. This is done by surveillance and maximising the control of risk factors. Multidisciplinary teams should be created for awareness and screening methods should be used for early diagnosis. Moreover, a diabetes care programme should be implemented. Education is also a powerful tool for the awareness and prevention of diabetes. Government should play a major role in allocating money for the availability of insulin for all socio-economic classes.

=== Skin Diseases ===
Eczema is the most common skin disease in Pakistan, followed by dermatological infections including bacterial, viral, fungal, sexually transmitted infections, drug reactions, urticarial and psoriasis.

=== Family planning ===
"The government of Pakistan wants to stabilize the population (achieve zero growth rate) by 2020. And maximizing the usage of family planning methods is one of the pillars of the population program". The latest Pakistan Demographic and Health Survey (PDHS) conducted by Macro International with partnership of National Institute of Population Studies (NIPS) registered family planning usage in Pakistan to be 30 percent. While this shows an overall increase from 12 percent in 1990-91 (PDHS 1990–91), 8% of these are users of traditional methods.

Approximately 7 million women use any form of family planning and the number of urban family planning users have remained nearly static between 1990 and 2007. Since many contraception users are sterilized (38%), the actual number of women accessing any family planning services in a given year are closer to 3 million with over half buying either condoms or pills from stores directly. Government programs by either the Health or Population ministries together combine to reach less than 1 million users annually. Demographic transition of Pakistan has been delayed by slow onset of fertility decline, with a total fertility rate of 3.8 children per woman - 31 per cent higher than the desired rate.

Some of the main factors that account for this lack of progress with Family Planning include inadequate programs that do not meet the needs of women who desire family planning. Also, there is a lack of health workers who can educate about potential side effects, ineffective campaign to convince women and their families about the value of smaller families. Along with that, the overall social norms of society where women seldom control decisions about their own fertility also play a major role. The single most important factor that has confounded efforts to promote family planning in Pakistan is the lack of consistent supply of commodities and services.

The unmet need for contraception has remained high at around 25% of all married women of reproductive age (higher than the proportion that are using a modern contraceptive and twice as high as the number of women being served with family planning services in any given year) and historically any attempt to supply commodities has been met with extremely rapid rise (over 10% per annum) in contraception users compared with the 0.5% increase in national CPR over the past 50 years.

Currently the government contributes about a third of all FP services and the private sector including NGOs the rest. Within the private sector, franchised clinics offer higher quality health care than unfranchised clinics but there is no discernible difference between costs per client and proportion of poorest clients across franchised and unfranchised private clinics. Government programs are run by both the Ministries of Population Welfare and Health. The most common method used is condoms 33.6%, female sterilization which accounts for 33.2%, injectables 10.7%, IUD 8.8%, Pill 6.1%, lactation ammenorhea method 5.7%, others 1.9%.

METHODS	USAGE
Condoms	33.6%
Female sterilization	33.2%
Injectables	10.7%
IUD	8.8%
Pill	6.1%
Lactation ammenorhea	5.7%
Others	1.9%

=== Maternal Health ===
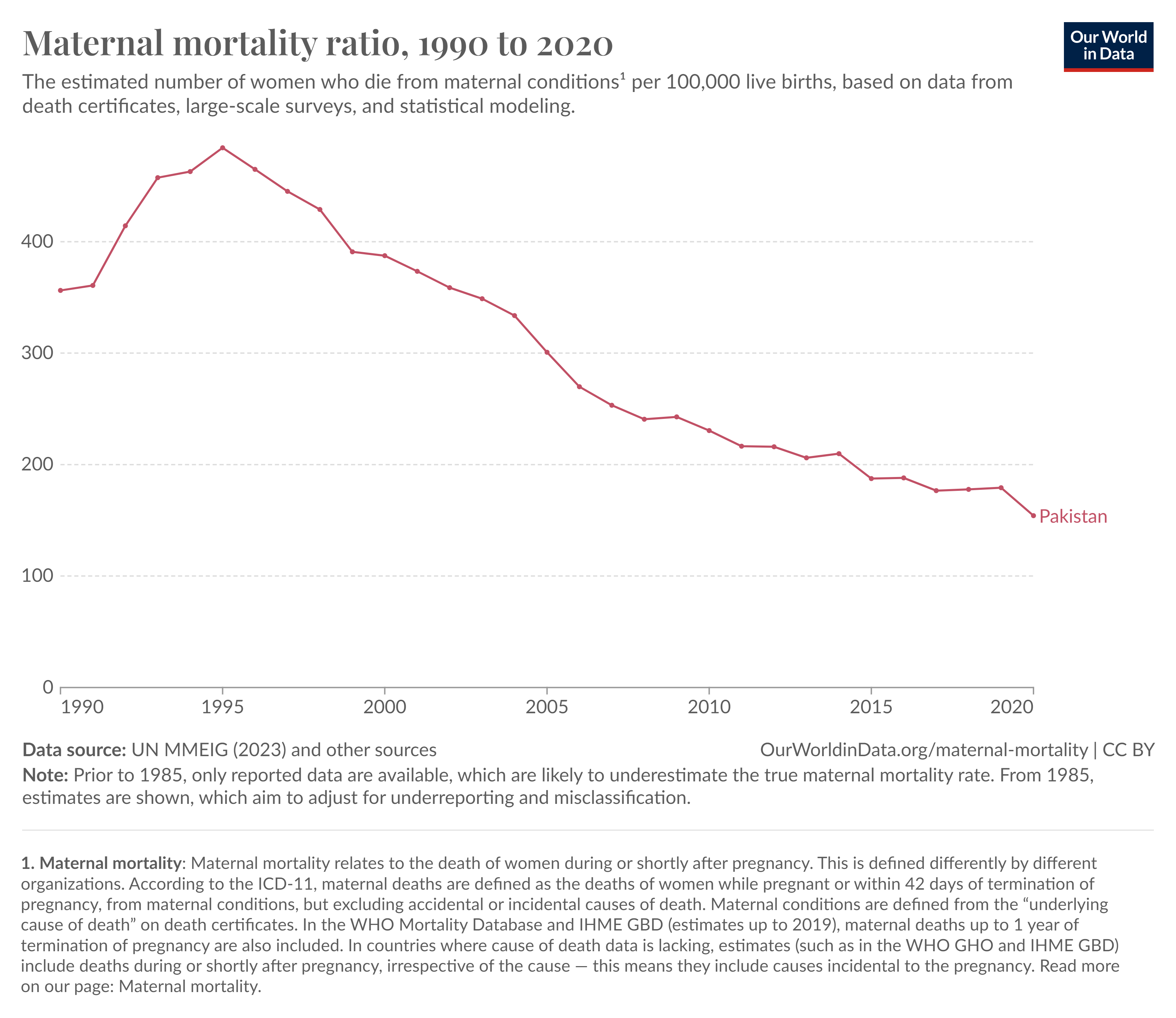
Maternal mortality trends in Pakistan from 1990 to 2020

Despite major improvements in the past years owing to intervention programs, Maternal Health in Pakistan remains a point of concern. As it currently stands, Pakistan's maternal mortality ratio remains high at 154 per 100,000 live births as of 2020, a significant improvement from 387 in 2000 and 187 in 2015. The Pakistan Maternal Mortality Survey (PMMS) launched in 2019 was the first nationwide survey on maternal mortality and provides essential data on maternal mortality rates and the effectiveness of healthcare interventions, while shedding light on statistics regarding antenatal care, delivery care, treatment, and regional differences in mortality and morbidity ratio.

Maternal mortality in Pakistan varies across the country; with Balochistan and Sindh having the highest mortality rates of 298 and 224 (per 100,000 live births) respectively, followed by Khyber Pakhtunkhwa (165) and the lowest in Punjab (157). This data suggests that while women's access to healthcare has likely improved in Punjab and Khyber Pakhtunkhwa, contributing to the overall reduction in maternal mortality, Sindh and Balochistan still face significant challenges in enhancing and ensuring adequate health service delivery, owing to geographical isolation, difficult terrain, and political instability.

There is also urban-rural disparity, as the mortality rate is 26% higher in rural areas than in urban areas due to low health education and lack of access to proper healthcare facilities.

==== Causes of Maternal Mortality ====
Maternal deaths are divided into 2 categories: direct and indirect. Direct deaths result from obstetric complications arising during pregnancy, birth, and 42 days after such as uncontrolled bleeding, preeclampsia, and eclampsia, while Indirect are caused by non-obstetric complications that were aggravated by pregnancy such as hypertensive disorders, hemorrhage, and sepsis. According to a survey done in 2019 by PMSS in all regions across Pakistan (excluding AJK and Gilgit Baltistan), 96% of all maternal deaths were the result of direct complications while 4% were from indirect.

Causes of Death	Percentage contribution
Obstetric Haemorrhage	41%
Hypertensive Disorders	29%
Pregnancy with abortive outcome	10%
Other obstetric complications	10%
Pregnancy-related infection	6%
Non-obstetric	4%

==== Delivery care ====
In Pakistan, 71% of live births are delivered in private health facilities in the report from 2019, a 57% increase from 1990-1991 when only 14% live births were delivered in health facilities and more women opted for home births. These statistics vary depending on women's socio-economic status and education level. According to a study conducted in Sindh, a primarily rural province in the south of Pakistan, a higher percentage of women (89.9%) who gave birth at home lacked formal education. Factors strongly linked to home deliveries included older age, lack of education, high parity, influence of family, religious and traditional beliefs and absence of antenatal care visits.

Home births are traditionally assisted by birth attendants, commonly known as dai ma who acts as a source of guidance and support to women through the process of labor.

==== Healthcare Interventions and Programs ====
In the past 40 years, there have been major improvements in maternal health in Pakistan, owing to well-timed interventions targeting the vulnerable parts of society. The highest maternal mortality rate was in 1995, with 484 women dying from maternal conditions per 100,000 live births. Since then, there has been a steady decline in the mortality rate

===== 1. Lady Health Workers Program =====
Launched in 1994, this community-based program targeted women residing in rural areas and empowered local women and female community health workers to provide essential maternal, antenatal, and postnatal care along with health education and immunizations to women across regions. Prior to this program, it was difficult for a woman to get educated, especially to receive access to medical or healthcare training due to societal and cultural beliefs. In Pakistan, the literacy rates for women were 42%, which were much lower than that of men who had a rate of 67%. The contributor to this was the concerns from family regarding safety when traveling to school and safety at school. Attending school in the 1960s was difficult as there were many challenges, such as having to be chaperoned by a male and receiving limited training. Women were limited clinical exposure to males due to cultural norms, which posed challenges for them when they practices in the United States. Fatima Jinnah Women's Medical College in Lahore was one of the few that provided education for a woman and allowed her to access medical training. The Lady Health Workers Program allowed for the employment of local women and equipping them with medical knowledge ensured that they were already aware of the contextual situation of the targeted women, and this helped develop a sense of trust, making it easier to address issues like cultural barriers and misconceptions related to maternal healthcare.

===== 2. Maternal, Neonatal, and Child Health Program =====
Launched in 2007, with a collaboration with WHO and UNICEF, this program's goal was to increase access to skilled birth attendants and emergency obstetric care in the case of labor complications. Focusing on both MDG 4 and 5 related to child and maternal mortality respectively, the goal was to strengthen the pre-existing healthcare infrastructure, including maternity wards and midwife services, in underserved and rural areas. The program was a sustainable move on the government's part as it focused on health education as well as immunizations as a preventative measure and bring down both the maternal morbidity and mortality.

===== 3. Waseela-e-Sehat Program =====
Launched in 2012, under the Benazir Income Support Programme, the program aimed to alleviate healthcare costs for underprivileged families by offering financial support in terms of loans or aid. It particularly focused on providing health insurance for pregnant women as well as covering childbirth-related expenses, including delivery and emergency obstetric care for a major part of the rural population. Targeting the part of society which is most vulnerable to maternal mortality cases by providing antenatal and postnatal care made a large impact in the overall women health of Pakistan.

==== Future Outlook ====
There have been ongoing efforts over the years to improve maternal health in Pakistan. Future prospects include the expansion of the Lady Health Worker program, as well as introduction and proper implementation of social reform programs like Sehat Sahulat to provide healthcare resources to low-income families. There has been increased focus on family planning, sexual health and women empowerment, with initiatives like the Aurat March and Rahnuma FPAP (Family Planning Association of Pakistan) to improve women health overall. To counter the regional disparity between provinces, decentralization of women health services along with increased budget allocation have been proposed to focus more on areas where there is a severe lack of health infrastructure and which have the highest burden of maternal mortality.

=== Child Health ===
The mental, physical, social, emotional as well as intellectual well-being of a child from conception and throughout adolescence is considered as Child Health. However, this doesn't mean that only infirmity and disorders are considered, there are multiple other things whose presence and/or absence can lead to low child health. In general terms:

- Mental and emotional health: this includes the psychological well-being of the child, including the child's ability to deal with challenges
- Physical health: this includes growth and development of the child under proper conditions with minimum risks of illness and disease.
- Social health: this includes the child's ability to interact with others and to form bonds/relationships with others.
- Intellectual health: this is the learning abilities or the child along with cognitive development and growth.

Factors that influence are multiple but encompasses both the mental and physical health of the child. These factors include:

- Family environment and dynamics
- Social and community factors
- Accessibility and availability to healthcare, education and stable nutrition
- Safety and protection
- Opportunities and conducive environment for growth

Investing in children's health have far reaching effects on the community and the nation as it is foundational to adult health and societal well-being. Pakistan is working on the targets set by sustainable development goals, specifically SDG 3.2 to reduce their neonatal mortality rate (NMR) and under 5 mortality rates (U5MR). These two indicators are the best measuring tools and predictors of child health. To meet the targets, Umeed-e-Nau was established in 2016 to provide effective and proven Maternal and Newborn Child Health interventions in the areas of Pakistan where burden of disease was the highest. This project utilizes the already present public sector health centers in Pakistan both at the community and facility level to reduce the perinatal mortality by at least 20% from the baseline.

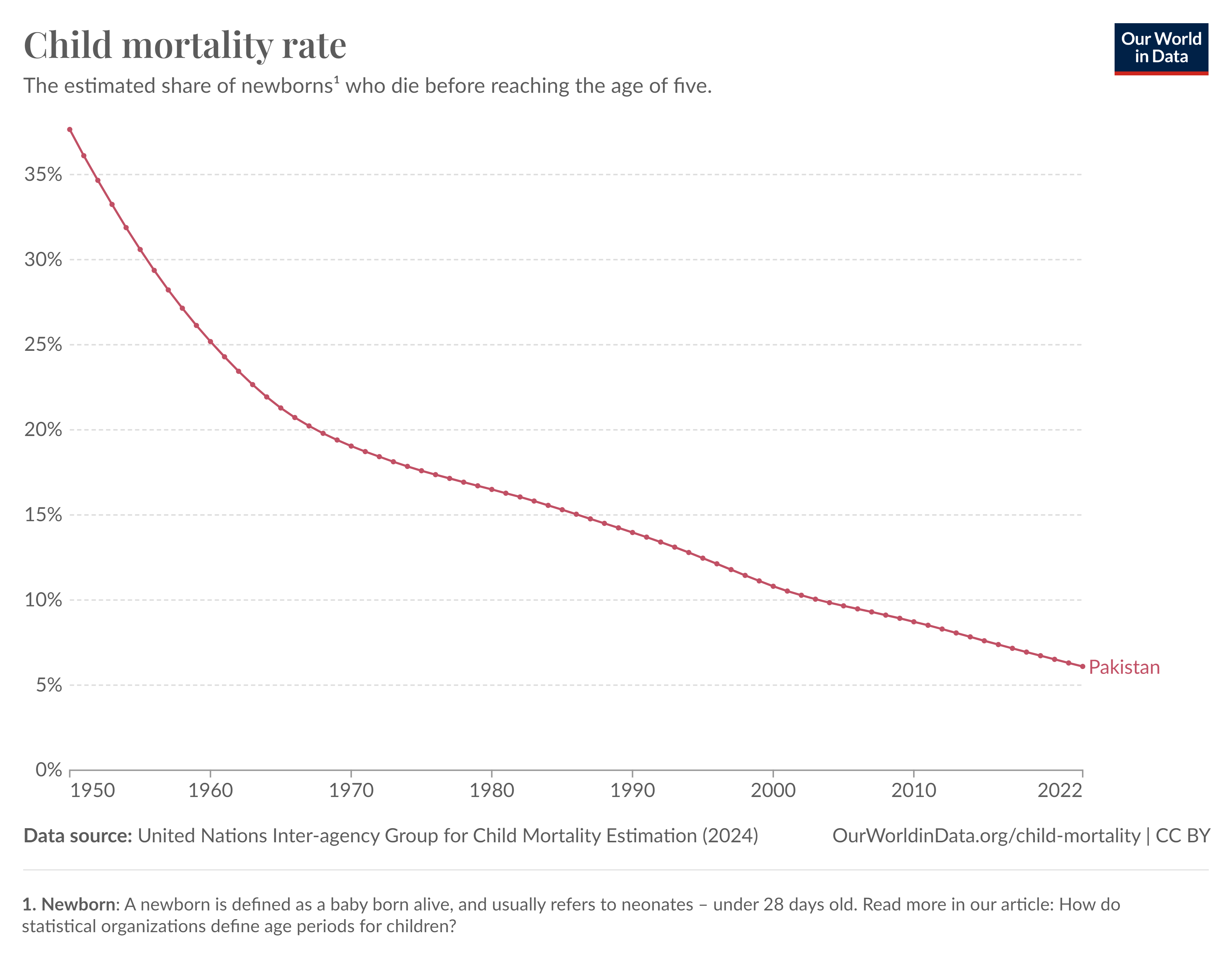
Child Mortality Rate (U5MR) in Pakistan from 1950 to 2021

The high child mortality rates in Pakistan are due to sudden infant death (SIDS), lack of vaccinations, unsafe deliveries, poor socioeconomic conditions, struggling healthcare systems, birth defects and premature births. Child mortality rate (Under 5 Mortality Rate) was estimated to be 376.9 in 1950 which decreased to 108 per 1000 live births in 2000.The U5MR of Pakistan is 63.33 per 1000 live births. Similarly, neonatal mortality rate of Pakistan was 103 in 1952 which decreased to 39 per 1000 live births in 2021. Both these rates are still very high when compared to Sustainable Development Goal target 3.1 of 25 for U5MR and 12 for neonatal mortality per 1000 live births. Neonatal disorders, lower respiratory infections, diarrhea, congenital birth defects and malaria caused the most deaths in children under five years of age.

==== Reasons ====
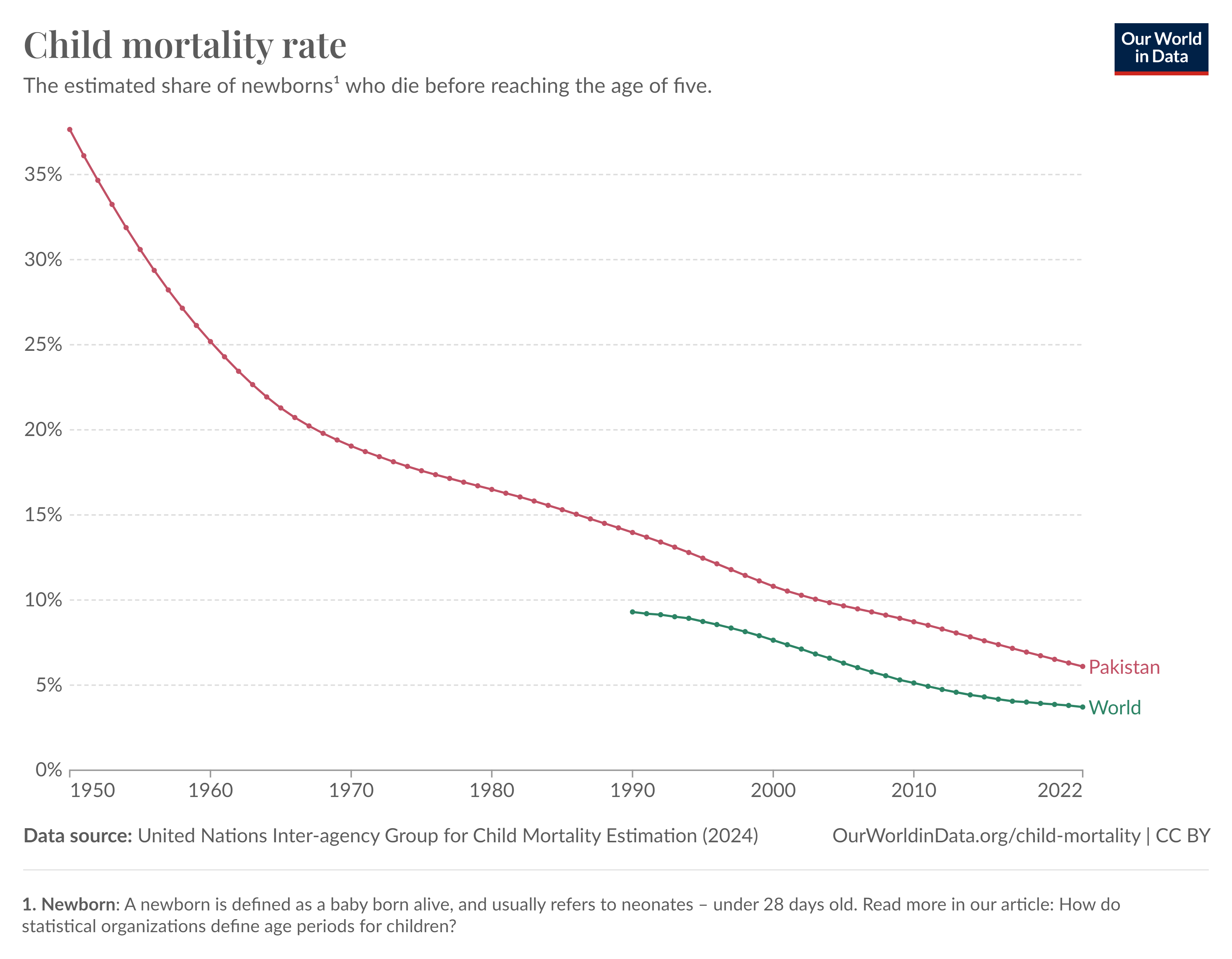
Child mortality rates in Pakistan as compared to the World from 1950 to 2022

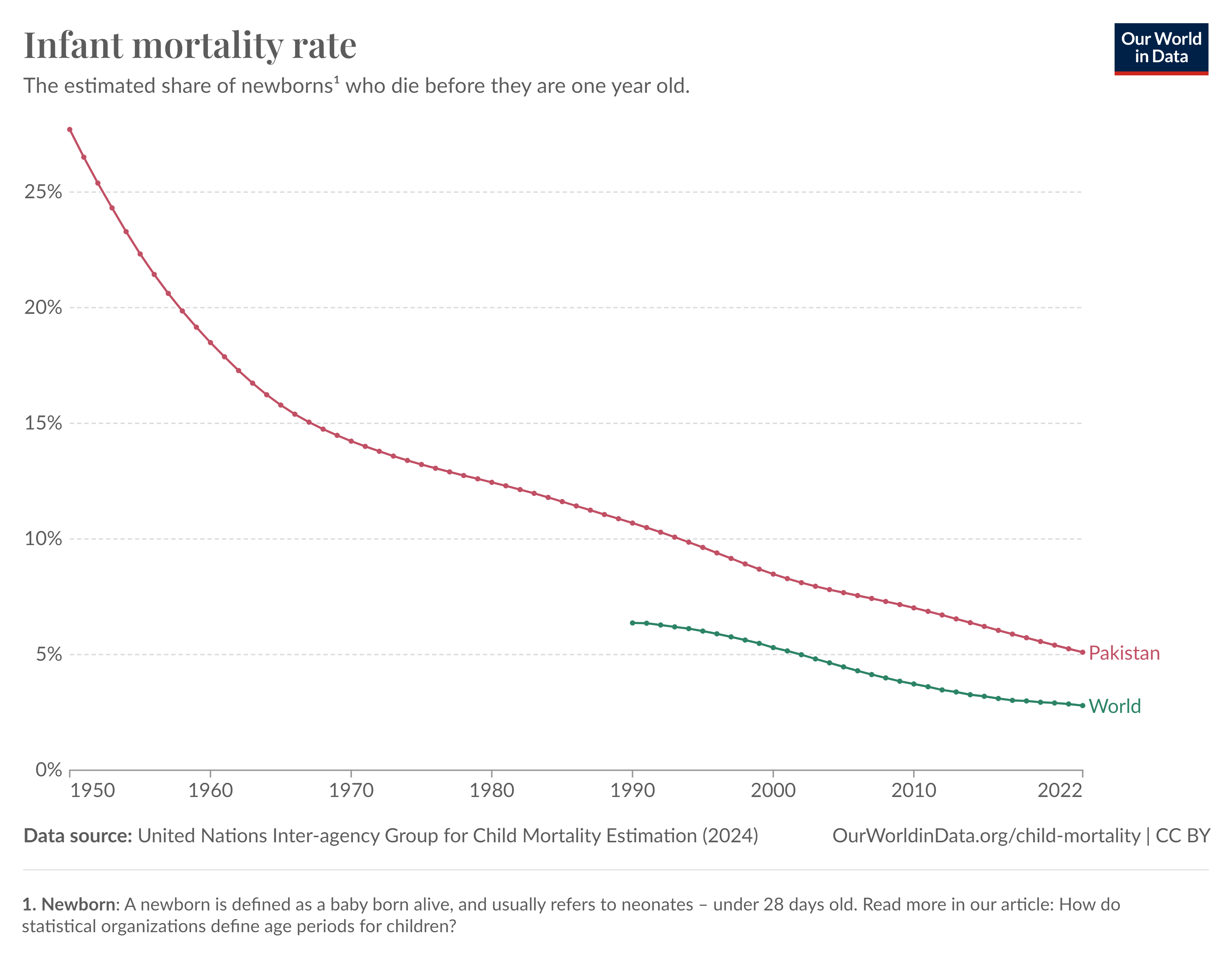
Infant mortality rates in Pakistan as compared to the World from 1950 to 2022

In Pakistan, the number of children who die before they turn five is very high compared to other countries. In 2020, there were 6.1 deaths for every 100 live births in Pakistan, which is much higher than the global average of 3.7 deaths per 100 live births. Similarly, the number of babies who die within their first year (known as infant mortality) is also higher in Pakistan. In 2022, the infant mortality rate in Pakistan was 5.1 deaths per 100 live births, compared to the global average of 2.8 deaths per 100 live births.

For such a high rate of death, there are multiple reasons behind it such as:

Category	Details
Neonatal Death	Death within 28 days of birth. Causes: premature birth, low birth weight, Respiratory Distress Syndrome (RDS), intraventricular hemorrhage (IVH), Necrotizing enterocolitis (NEC).
Premature Birth Complications	Respiratory issues, growth retardation, weak immune system, sepsis, and infections due to unsterilized umbilical cord and harmful substances.
Birth Defects	Structural or functional anomalies present at or before birth. Causes: genetic abnormalities, advanced maternal age, consanguineous marriages, environmental factors, and low income.
Lack of Vaccination	70% of childhood deaths due to infections. Only 58% of at-risk children are vaccinated. Issues: vaccine hesitancy, misconceptions, and violence against vaccine providers. Progress in polio eradication.
Unsafe Deliveries & Poor Breastfeeding	Unsafe home deliveries and poor neonatal care in rural areas. High mortality due to untrained midwives, improper breastfeeding practices. Benefits of proper breastfeeding: significantly reduces neonatal and child mortality rates.
Stillbirth & Associated Factors	Highest rate among 186 countries as of 2015. Risks: uneducated women, low wealth, rural location, multiparity, preterm labor, antepartum hemorrhage, hypertensive disorders, congenital malformations, and maternal complications.
Sudden Infant Death Syndrome (SIDS)	Major cause of neonatal death. Risk factors: male sex, sleep apnea, cardiovascular issues, cultural practices (e.g., prone positioning), and maternal factors (e.g., young age, smoking).
Socioeconomic & Healthcare Factors	Higher child mortality linked to lower education, poverty, and inadequate healthcare. Factors include lack of education, poverty, poor sanitation, inadequate housing, and limited access to healthcare facilities. The COVID-19 pandemic worsened the situation by increasing maternal and infant complications and reducing healthcare access.

==== Interventions ====
To reduce the number of child and infant deaths in Pakistan, we need to take several important actions. And these interventions are as follows:

Improving Neonatal Care

Enhanced Prenatal Care: Increase access to regular prenatal care to monitor and manage risks associated with premature births and low birth weight.

Training for Healthcare Providers: Train healthcare workers in neonatal resuscitation and management of complications such as Respiratory Distress Syndrome (RDS) and Necrotizing Enterocolitis (NEC).

Sterilization Practices: Ensure proper sterilization techniques are used for umbilical cord care to prevent infections like sepsis.

Addressing Birth Defects

Genetic Counseling: Provide genetic counseling for couples, especially those with a family history of genetic disorders or those in consanguineous marriages.

Maternal Health Programs: Improve maternal nutrition and manage maternal infections and chronic conditions like diabetes to reduce the risk of birth defects.

Early Screening: Increase access to prenatal screening and diagnostic tests to identify and manage birth defects early.

Increasing Vaccination Coverage

Community Education: Implement widespread education campaigns to counter vaccine hesitancy and misinformation.

Improved Vaccine Delivery: Strengthen vaccine delivery systems, particularly in rural areas, and ensure safe conditions for vaccine storage and administration.

Incentives for Vaccination: Provide incentives for families to vaccinate their children, such as free health checkups or essential supplies.

Enhancing Safe Delivery Practices

Training for Midwives: Offer training and certification for midwives and traditional birth attendants to improve home delivery practices and emergency response.

Promotion of Hospital Deliveries: Encourage and support hospital deliveries, especially in high risk cases, by improving access and affordability.

Breastfeeding Education: Educate new mothers about the benefits of exclusive breastfeeding and proper breastfeeding techniques.

Reducing Stillbirth Rates

Maternal Health Services: Improve access to maternal health services, particularly for high risk groups like uneducated women and those in rural areas.

Management of Pregnancy Complications: Enhance the management of conditions like preeclampsia and antepartum hemorrhage through better prenatal care and monitoring.

Public Health Campaigns: Raise awareness about risk factors for stillbirth and promote practices to reduce these risks.

Preventing Sudden Infant Death Syndrome (SIDS)

Safe Sleep Education: Educate parents on safe sleep practices, such as placing babies on their backs to sleep and avoiding bedsharing.

Public Awareness Campaigns: Increase awareness about the risk factors for SIDS, including maternal smoking and alcohol consumption during pregnancy.

Access to Support Services: Provide support for new parents to ensure they have access to necessary resources and information.

Addressing Socioeconomic Factors

Educational Programs: Improve education for women and families, focusing on health literacy and preventive care.

Economic Support: Implement programs to reduce poverty and improve access to healthcare, such as subsidized healthcare services and nutritional support for pregnant women and children.

Improved Infrastructure: Invest in better healthcare infrastructure, including more healthcare facilities and improved sanitation in rural areas.

Enhancing Healthcare Systems

Increase Resources: Increase funding for maternal and child health services, including more hospitals, health units, and trained staff.

Telemedicine: Expand telemedicine services to provide remote consultations and support for those in remote or underserved areas.

COVID19 Response: Strengthen the healthcare system to handle pandemics and ensure that routine and emergency maternal and child health services continue.

Implementing these interventions requires coordinated efforts between government bodies, healthcare providers, communities, and international organizations to create a supportive environment for improving child health outcomes.

=== Nutrition ===
Undernutrition

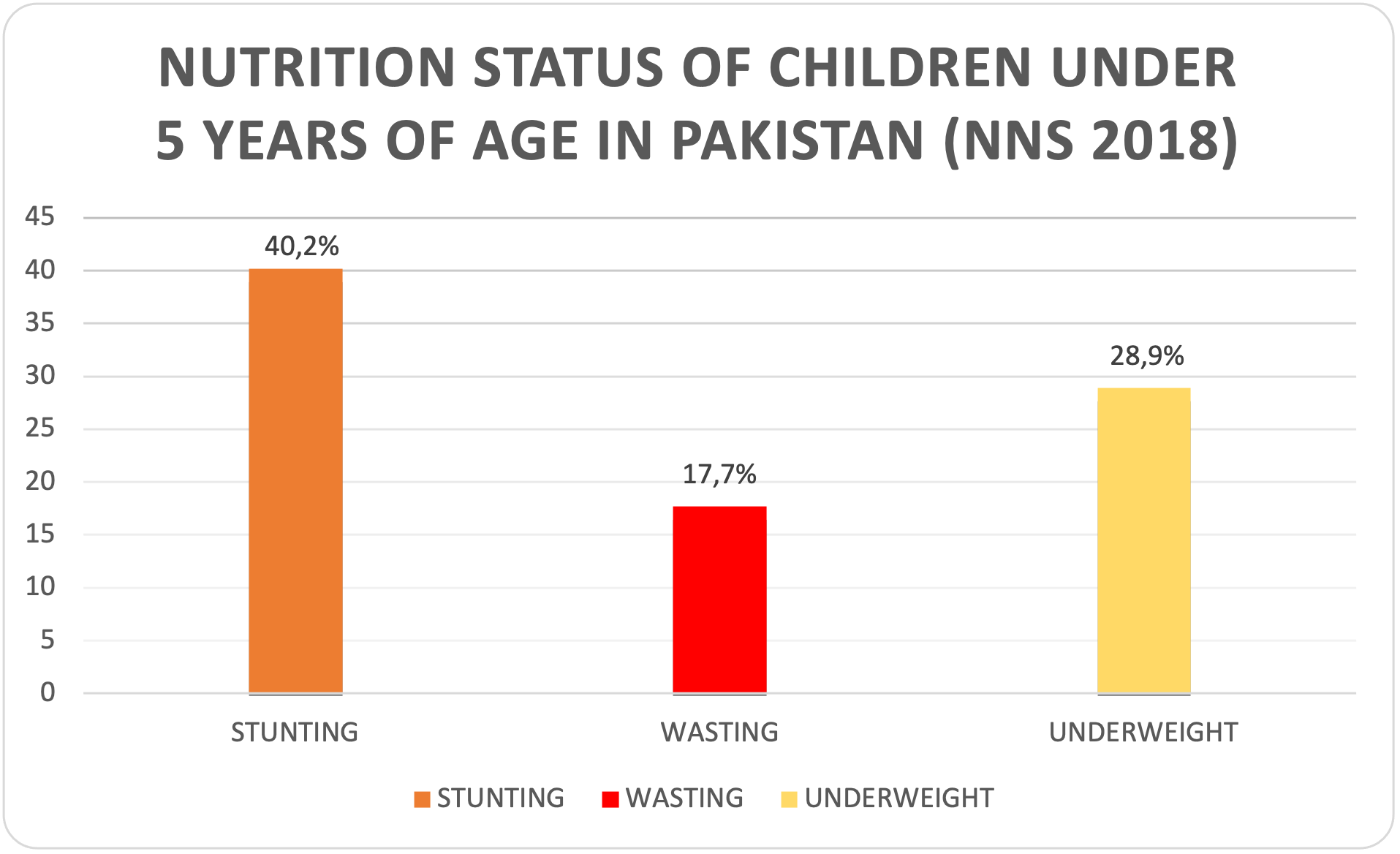
Malnutrition in children under 5 years of age in Pakistan according to National Nutrition Survey Pakistan 2018

Nutritionally deprived children not only face difficulties in learning, but also are at prime risk of getting infections, face difficulty in combating and recovering from diseases. According to National Nutrition Survey 2018, around 40.2% children in Pakistan are stunted. There are many reasons behind that but the most important reason and one of the most contributing factors is breastfeeding (early initiation of breastfeeding, exclusive breastfeeding & continuation of breastfeeding till 2 years of age). Only 45.8% mothers started breastfeeding to their children on the first day of birth & only 48.4% mothers continued breastfeeding for exclusively 6 months (Exclusive breastfeeding). 17.7% children in Pakistan are wasted which is the very critical as per the standards of World Health Organization (WHO). Despite there are many programs working to decrease the rate of stunting and wasting in Pakistan since the last fluids (2010-2011) but there is no significant improvement in the health of the children. The prevalence of stunting was 43.7% in 2011 & it is 40.2% in 2018, which is still a critical level and the prevalence of wasting was 15.1% in 2011 and it became 17.7% in 2018, which shows the failure of all the projects working to combat undernutrition from Pakistan.

==== Over-nutrition (Overweight/Obesity) ====
Obesity is a health issue that has attracted concern only in the past few years. Urbanisation and an unhealthy, energy-dense diet (the high presence of oil and fats in Pakistani cooking), as well as changing lifestyles, are among the root causes contributing to obesity in the country. According to a list of the world's "fattest countries" published on Forbes, Pakistan is ranked 165 (out of 194 countries) in terms of its overweight population, with 22.2% of individuals over the age of 15 crossing the threshold of obesity. This ratio roughly corresponds with other studies, which state one-in-four Pakistani adults as being overweight.

Research indicates that people living in large cities in Pakistan are more exposed to the risks of obesity as compared to those in the rural countryside. Women also naturally have higher rates of obesity as compared to men. Pakistan also has the highest percentage of people with diabetes in South Asia.

According to one study, "fat" is more dangerous for South Asians than for Caucasians because the fat tends to cling to organs like the liver instead of the skin.

According to National Nutrition Survey Pakistan (NNS 2018), The study estimated the proportion of overweight children under five to be 9.5%, twice the target set by the World Health Assembly.

==== Malnutrition in Adolescents (10-19 years) ====
Nutrition status among Adolescents (10–19 years of age) varies differently between boys & girls. In 2018, 21.1% boys and 11.8% girls are underweight, 10.2& boys & 11.4% girls are overweight & 7.7% boys and 5.5% girls are obese. More than half (56.6%) of adolescent girls in Pakistan are anaemic, however only 0.9% have severe anaemia.

==== Malnutrition in Women of Reproductive age (WRA) ====
In Pakistan, WRA aged 15–49 years bear a double burden of malnutrition. One in seven (14.4%) are undernourished, a decline from 18% in 2011 to 14%, while overweight and obesity are increasing. In NNS 2011 28% were reported to be overweight or obese, rising to 37.8% 2018. About 41.7% of WRA are anaemic, about 79.7% WRA are vitamin D deficient, over a quarter of WRA (27.3%) are deficient in vitamin A, 18.2% of WRA are iron deficient, About 26.5% of WRA are hypocalcaemic while 0.4% are hypercalcaemic & 22.1% of WRA are zinc deficient.

==== Micronutrient Deficiencies in children under 5 years of age ====
More than half (53.7%) of Pakistani children are anaemic and 5.7% are severely anaemic. It was 50.9% in 2001, 61.9% in 2011 and 53.7% in 2018. The prevalence of iron deficiency anaemia is 28.6%, zinc deficiency is 18.6%, vitamin A deficiency is 51.5%, vitamin D deficiency is 62.7%.

== Vaccination ==
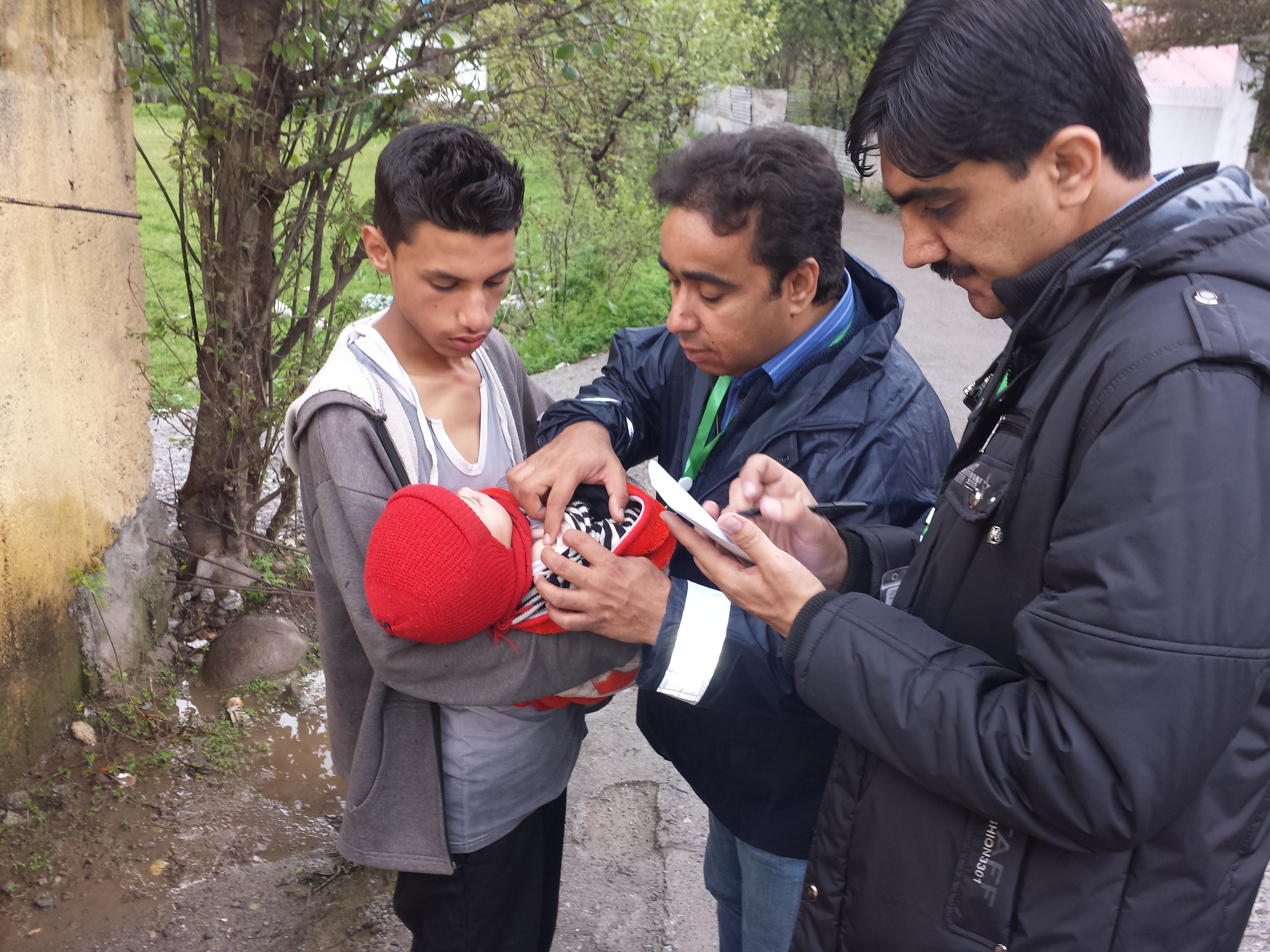
On March 26, 2014, two doctors from FELTP Pakistan check an infant in Muzaffarabad, Pakistan for the BCG vaccination scar.

Some vaccines are mandatory for the residents of Pakistan including Polio, BCG for childhood TB, Pentavalent vaccine (DTP+Hep B + Hib) for Diphtheria, Tetanus, Pertussis, Hepatitis B, Hib pneumonia and meningitis, Measles vaccine and rotavirus vaccine.

=== Expanded Program of Immunization (EPI) ===
Expanded Program on Immunization (EPI) was launched in Pakistan in 1978.In the beginning, this program was specifically started for childhood tuberculosis, poliomyelitis, diphtheria, pertussis, tetanus and measles.With the passage of time several new vaccines were added.

Vaccine Preventable Diseases (VPD) included in EPI

Currently 12 diseases are covered in EPI program including childhood tuberculosis, poliomyelitis, diphtheria, pertussis, tetanus, measles, diarrhea, pneumonia, hepatitis B, meningitis, typhoid, and rubella.

Progress of EPI in Pakistan

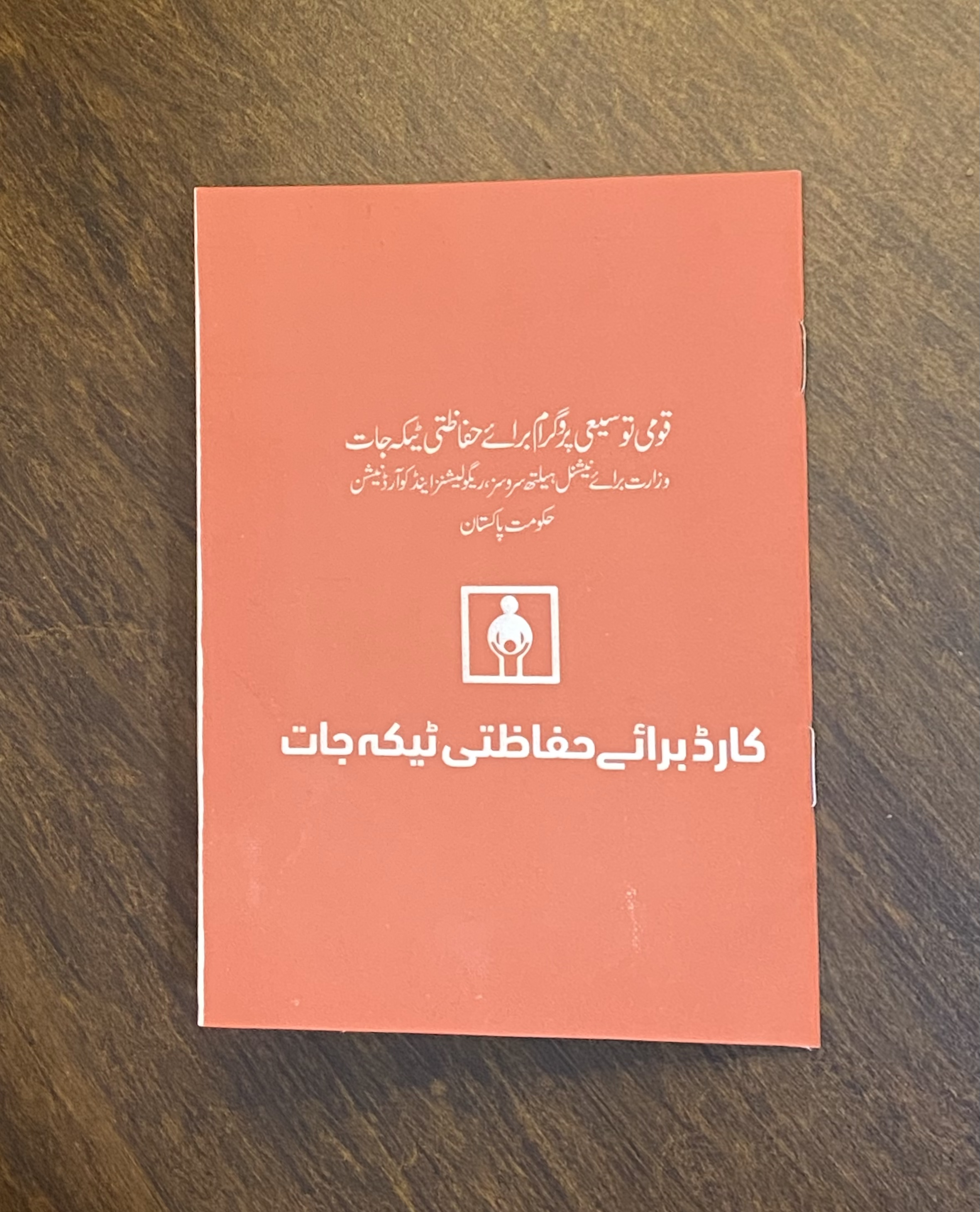
Image of Vaccination Card which is given to parents of each child being enrolled in EPI Pakistan.

There has been increase in vaccine coverage with BCG vaccine coverage increasing from 62% in 1997 to 95% in 2022.Similarly coverage for DTP1 increased from 69% in 2000 to 93% in 2022.The same trend was also observed for DTP3 with an increase of about 20% but still it stands low at 85% coverage (2022) in comparison. This means that about 8% of children who are vaccinated for DTP1 do not get vaccinated for DTP3. Similar trends have also been observed for other vaccines.

Pakistan's EPI vaccination schedule
Disease	Causative agent	Vaccine	Doses	Age of administration
Childhood TB	Bacteria	BCG	1	Soon after birth
Poliomyelitis	Virus	OPV	4	OPV0: soon after birth OPV1: 6 weeks OPV2: 10 weeks OPV3: 14 weeks
Poliomyelitis	Virus	IPV	1	IPV-I: 14 weeks
Diphtheria	Bacteria	Pentavalent vaccine (DTP+Hep B + Hib)	3	Penta1: 6 weeks Penta2: 10 weeks Penta3: 14 weeks
Tetanus	Bacteria	Pentavalent vaccine (DTP+Hep B + Hib)	3	Penta1: 6 weeks Penta2: 10 weeks Penta3: 14 weeks
Pertussis	Bacteria	Pentavalent vaccine (DTP+Hep B + Hib)	3	Penta1: 6 weeks Penta2: 10 weeks Penta3: 14 weeks
Hepatitis B	Virus	Pentavalent vaccine (DTP+Hep B + Hib)	3	Penta1: 6 weeks Penta2: 10 weeks Penta3: 14 weeks
Hib pneumonia and meningitis	Bacteria	Pentavalent vaccine (DTP+Hep B + Hib)	3	Penta1: 6 weeks Penta2: 10 weeks Penta3: 14 weeks
Measles	Virus	Measles	2	Measles1: 9 months Measles2: 15months
Diarrhoea due to rotavirus	Virus	*Rotavirus	2	Rota 1: 6 weeks Rota 2: 10 weeks

== Climate change implications on health ==
Pakistan is one of the five most affected countries in the world due to climate change from the year 1999–2018. Pakistan's vulnerability to climate change is a result of its geographic location, heavy reliance on agriculture and water resources, limited adaptive capacity among its people, and an inadequate emergency preparedness system.Climate-related hazards in Pakistan include floods, which bring risks of diseases like Diarrhea, Gastroenteritis, Skin Infections, Eye Infections, Acute Respiratory Infections, and Malaria. Droughts increase health risks such as food insecurity, malnutrition, Anaemia, Night blindness, and Scurvy. Rising temperatures pose threats like Heat Stroke, Malaria, Dengue, Respiratory Diseases, and Cardiovascular diseases.

In 2015, Karachi and surrounding areas of Sindh province, faced a heatwave that led to over 65,000 hospitalizations and over 2000 deaths.

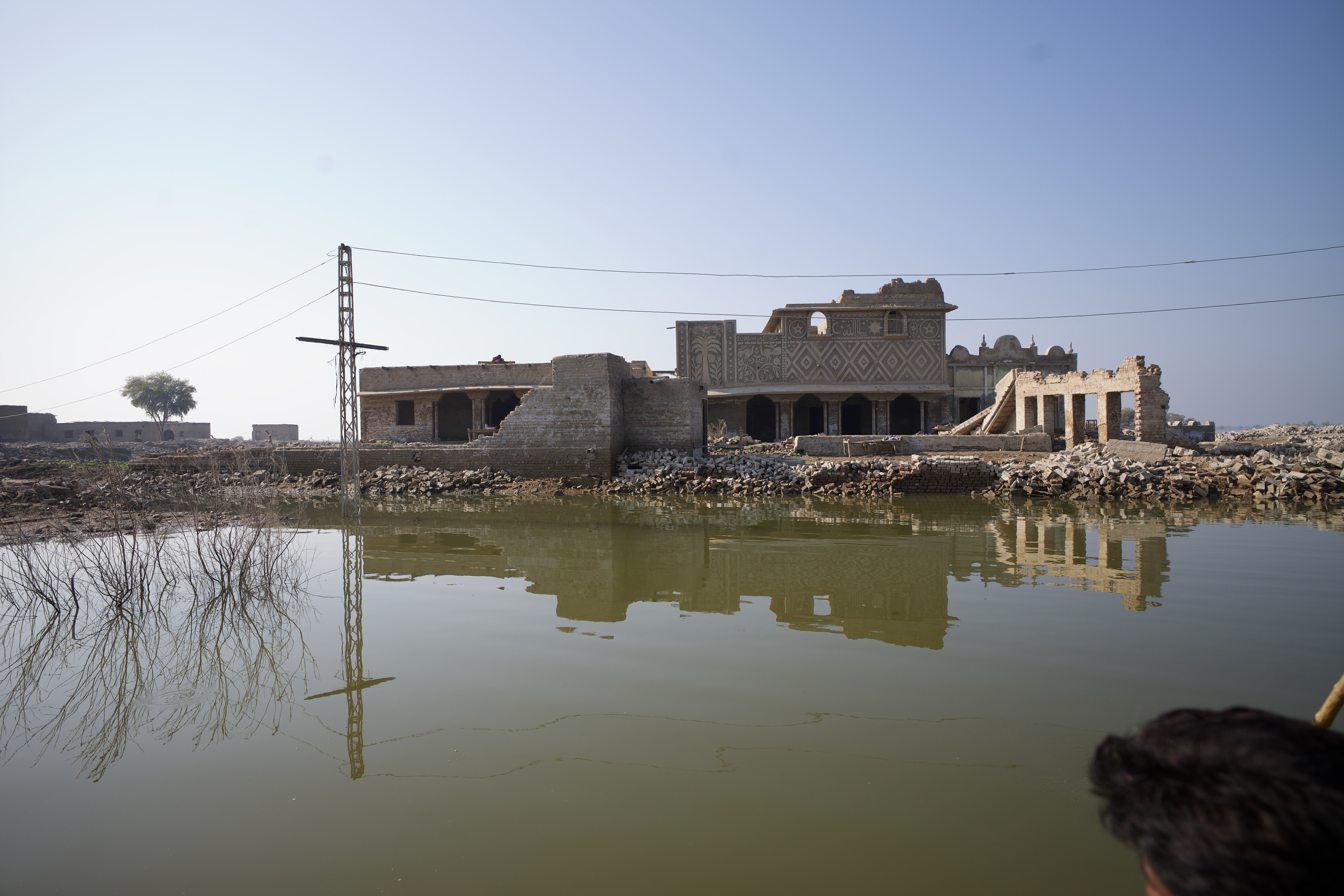
Image from Chor Kambar village in Sindh, Pakistan taken about 4 months after August 2022 floods.

The worst example of climate change impact on health in Pakistan was 2022 flooding which submerged about one third of the country, affecting 33 million people, half of whom were children. The floods damaged most of the water systems in affected areas, forcing more than 5.4 million people to rely solely on contaminated water from ponds and wells. This crisis highlighted a significant lack of emergency preparedness. The economic and health toll was immense, with 1,730 deaths resulting from the 2022 floods, displacing 8 million individuals and exposing them to disease and under-nutrition. Notably, 89,000 people in Sindh and 116,000 in Baluchistan remain permanently displaced.

Post-disaster assessments predict that these floods will push an additional 8.4–9.1 million people below the poverty line, reversing health gains. Over 2.5 million people lack access to safe drinking water, and Malaria outbreaks have been reported in at least 12 districts of Sindh and Balochistan. The situation is dire, with over 7 million children and women urgently requiring access to nutrition services.

Pakistan EPA (Environment Protection Agency) has been formed with the aim to combat changing climate and its implications on Pakistani population.It is an executive agency of the Government of Pakistan managed by Ministry of Climate Change.

It was reported in August 2023 that approximately 100,000 people have been evacuated from flooded villages in Punjab, with over 175 rain-related deaths in whole of Pakistan during this monsoon season, primarily due to electrocution and building collapses. These events underscore the pressing need for comprehensive climate resilience and emergency response strategies in Pakistan.
