= Emergency medical services in Pakistan =

Emergency medical services (EMS) in Pakistan are provided both by the government and private sector, with the latter being mainly a payment-for-service system. Healthcare falls under the responsibility of provincial governments (Sindh, Punjab, Balochistan, Khyber Pakhtunkhwa), except for in the federally administered territories.

According to the National Health Care Act 2017, every patient has the right to receive life-saving care without advance payment for treatment. Healthcare professionals and establishments are obligated, under all circumstances, to treat an emergency patient.

EMS in Pakistan include pre-hospital emergency care, such as ambulance services. Ambulance services are mostly provided by non-governmental organizations (NGOs), like Edhi Foundation and Chhipa Welfare Association, with the exception of services like the Punjab government's Rescue 1122. Although the majority of ambulance services in Pakistan are operated by NGOs, the pre-hospital emergency care staff is usually untrained. Most services are unable to provide advanced life support to patients on-site, apart from EMS organizations like Aman Foundation, which have more trained staff. According to Aman Foundation, emergencies are reported every two minutes on a daily basis in Karachi alone, thus there is a greater need to expand emergency medical services in the country. The state of emergency medical services in Pakistan is a cause for concern. Emergency medical services in Pakistan face significant challenges, with many areas experiencing inadequate infrastructure and resources, making the situation concerning.

== Emergency ambulance helplines in Pakistan ==
Ambulance Services	Karachi (021)	Islamabad (051)	Lahore (042)	Quetta (081)	Peshawar (0521)
Edhi Foundation	115	115	115	115	115
Chhipa Welfare Association	1020	1020	--	--	--
Sindh Integrated Emergency & Health Services	1122	--	--	--	--
Pakistan Red Crescent Society	1030	1030	1030	1030	1030
Al Khidmat Foundation	1023	1023	1023	1023	1023
Rescue 1122	1122	1122	1122	1122	1122
JDC Welfare Foundation	1024	--	--	--	--

== Ambulance services in Pakistan ==
=== Edhi Foundation ===
==== Edhi land ambulance services ====
Edhi Foundation operates a fleet of over 1800 land ambulances. In 2013, Raheem Ghani—the official in-charge of Edhi Foundation's 24-hour emergency at Tower—said that the NGO had about 200 Suzuki high-roof ambulances in Karachi, at that time, with more all over Pakistan. According to him, the organization also had 20 Toyota Hiace, 2 Mercedes vans and 4 Toyota Land Cruisers. As of 2017, the Edhi Foundation has had plans to improve its land ambulance services by keeping trained paramedics on board in order to aid patients who are in critical conditions on their way to the hospital. The plan is to increase the number of trained paramedics and ambulance drivers from the original 70 to 80 trained drivers, and recruit more highly trained paramedics.

==== Edhi air ambulance services ====
There are 2 aircraft and 1 helicopter to rescue and provide relief to patients in areas struck with natural disasters. They offer airlift services to stranded or injured people in need of immediate medical attention.

==== Edhi marine ambulance services ====
Operating 28 rescue boats, the Edhi marine ambulance service provides aid to those in flood-affected areas or drown victims along the Arabian Sea.

=== Pakistan Red Crescent Society ===
With a response time of 7 to 10 minutes, the Pakistan Red Crescent Society provides an ambulance service all over Pakistan. A fleet of 12 ambulances—all Toyota Hiace vans—is operated in the capital of Pakistan, Islamabad. 6 of those ambulances remain standby at the PRCS Headquarters, while the other 6 are placed at different prominent locations throughout the city. Some ambulances are dedicated to a particular treatment, like cardiac ambulances.

The staff in PRCS ambulances is trained to perform first-aid, and the ambulances are equipped with oxygen cylinders and ambulance bags, blood pressure apparatus, clinical thermometers, stethoscopes, pyodine, foldable stretchers, CPR masks, and eye dressing pads.

=== Sindh Rescue and Medical Services ===
In December 2018, an agreement was signed between the government of Sindh (Pakistan People's Party) and the Patients Aid Foundation (PAF) to run an ambulance service, free of cost, in Sindh. This will be operated on the basis of the public-private partnership (PPP). A fleet of 85, fully equipped vehicles were used to operate the ambulance service.

According to the agreement, the Sindh government will take over the services of the Aman Foundation and run the ambulances on new name called Sindh Rescue and Medical Services.

The ambulance service is operating in Karachi, Hyderabad, Thatta and Sujawal.

== See also ==
- Healthcare in Pakistan
- Non-governmental organizations in Pakistan
