= Medical tourism in Pakistan =

Medical tourism in Pakistan was initially strongly reliant on cheap organ transplant-related medical tourism. A sizable number of global patients traveled to Pakistan for kidney transplants in the past. However, these cases have dropped after legislation seeking to outlaw the illegal trade of kidneys was enacted. According to Pakistani medical experts, medical tourism is still an untapped market that could be turned into a huge opportunity if the government "focuses on key issues".

== Treatments ==
A significant number of patients from neighboring countries travel to Pakistan for medical treatment. Additionally, many patients of Pakistani origin residing in the Middle East, the United Kingdom, and the United States seek treatment in Pakistan, often due to the high costs or lack of insurance coverage in their home countries. Common procedures sought by these patients include cardiac surgery, infertility treatments, and cosmetic surgery.

=== Organ transplant ===
Pakistan's initial entry into the medical tourism industry was strongly reliant on cheap organ transplant-related medical tourism. In the past, a sizable number of global patients traveled to Pakistan for kidney transplants. However, these cases have dropped since legislation seeking to outlaw the illegal trade of kidneys was enacted. According to Pakistani medical experts, medical tourism is still an untapped market that could be turned into a huge opportunity if the government "focuses on key issues".

=== Fertility treatment ===
Pakistan has emerged as a lower-cost destination for fertility tourism, particularly for in-vitro fertilization (IVF) and other infertility treatments. Many overseas Pakistanis opt for IVF procedures in Pakistan due to the significantly lower costs. In 1998, there were only three IVF centers in Pakistan; this number has since increased to over 15.

The average cost of IVF in many countries can reach up to $12,000. In contrast, the cost in Pakistan ranges from approximately Rs. 200,000 (USD1,950) to Rs. 450,000 (USD4,390).

== Facilities ==
As of May 2025, the Joint Commission International, a United States-based nonprofit organization, has accredited seven institutions in Pakistan. In Karachi the Aga Khan University Hospital, Karachi, and the Karachi Diagnostic Centre & Clinic; in Lahore the Pakistan Kidney and Liver Institute and Research Center, the Shaukat Khanum Memorial Cancer Hospital and Research Centre, and the Shaukat Khanum Memorial Trust; in Peshawar the Shaukat Khanum Memorial Cancer Hospital and Research Centre, Peshawar; and in Islamabad the Shifa International Hospitals.

== Source countries ==
Most medical patients who seek treatment in Pakistan are from neighboring countries. According to Ministry of Foreign Affairs figures, approximately 90% of Afghans who seek medical treatment abroad travel to neighboring Pakistan. The majority of Afghan patients are from the poorer strata of society, who have access to free medical treatment in Pakistani government or philanthropic healthcare facilities. Over 40% of patients in Peshawar's largest government hospital were Afghans who had traveled from Afghanistan to Peshawar for medical treatment. Nearly one-third of all visas issued to Afghan nationals by the Pakistani embassy and consulates in Afghanistan pertain to medical reasons. In 2008, one philanthropic organization in Pakistan performed over 30,000 free eye surgeries on Afghan patients.

== Government strategy ==
The Government of Pakistan has identified medical tourism as a priority within its national tourism policy. In 2010, a task force was established under the Ministry of Tourism to develop strategies for promoting medical, health, spiritual, and wellness tourism in the country. As part of these efforts, the Government of Punjab initiated the development of a 150-bed hospital specializing in kidney transplantation and heart surgery, aiming to position Pakistan as a destination for international medical tourists.

The Minister of Tourism has announced plans to promote medical tourism in Pakistan by offering "low-cost, state-of-the-art medical facilities to patients." The minister emphasized the expertise of Pakistan's healthcare professionals and the availability of modern facilities, noting that certain surgical procedures could be performed at "less than a tenth of the cost in Europe or the United States."

== Challenges ==
The continuing illegal organ transplant trade has hampered the image of the country's medical tourism industry. Kidney trade, mostly illegal, was once a thriving billion-dollar industry in Pakistan until the introduction of a law to prevent it. The illegal trade is still practiced, however, with numerous cases being reported of foreign patients who have traveled to Pakistan to get kidney transplants. Secondly, while there is a large base of doctors present in the country, the overall health infrastructure of Pakistan is not as advanced or comparable to international standards. Only a certain number of modern and reputable hospitals exist. In addition, security-related issues have also prevented foreigners from traveling to Pakistan exclusively to seek medical treatment.

The industry's growth faces challenges, including security concerns and limitations within the country's overall healthcare infrastructure.

Professor Tipu Sultan from Bahria University has argued that while the government has focused on improving hospital quality in the hope of attracting medical tourists, "terrorism in Pakistan is scaring away potential health customers." He adds that Pakistan could offer services to foreigners in orthopedic, optometrist, ENT, heart, and urology treatments at cheap rates, besides offering facilities in endoscopies, X-rays, MRI, CT scans, cardiology, and arthroscopy. Commenting on patients from the United States of Pakistani origin who come to Pakistan instead of going to neighboring India to receive treatment, Sultan has said that treatment in Pakistan tends to be much cheaper for them than in India "because of the downward slide of the rupee in terms of the dollar." He has also said that while there are good national hospitals, they have not shown enough interest in medical tourism.

== See also ==
- Health care in Pakistan
- Tourism in Pakistan
- List of hospitals in Pakistan

=== Related articles ===
- Medical tourism in India
- Medical tourism in Israel
- Medical tourism in Thailand
