= Syed Fasih Iqbal =

Pakistani senator and journalist

Syed Fasih Iqbal, also spelled as Syed Faseih Iqbal, was a Pakistani senator and journalist. He was the founder and editor-in-chief of The Balochistan Times, an English-language newspaper based in Quetta; Zamana and Balochistan Times and. He also served as a president of Council of Pakistan Newspaper Editors (CPNE).

Fasih was born on 10 January 1936 in Allahabad. He attended the University of the Punjab and received a BA degree in journalism.

He served as a member of the Senate of Pakistan between 1985 and 1988. In March 1988, he was re-elected as a senator and served until March 1994.

He died in 2014 after a brief illness.
