= Rahnuma =

Organization in Lahore, Pakistan

The Family Planning Association of Pakistan, later renamed as Rahnuma, is a Pakistani organisation that was established in 1953. Rahnuma has developed programmes to increase access to high-quality, affordable health services. Rahnuma has advocated for a rights approach to sexual and reproductive health, for the empowerment of particular groups within communities (especially women and young girls), and for the strengthening of civil society in Pakistan. It is an affiliate of the International Planned Parenthood Federation.

== Major projects ==
=== Child marriage prevention ===
Rahnuma initiated several interventions to prevent child marriage in Pakistan through legislative reforms in the existing laws to make them more responsive and for their enhanced implementation.

=== Family planning ===
The organization reaches out to young people, people with disability and most vulnerable and marginalized with family planning services.

=== Sexual and reproductive health ===
Rahnuma seeks to provide sexual and reproductive health services to adolescents and young people based on their rights as opposed to simply on their needs.

=== Poverty alleviation ===
It is also actively involved in poverty alleviation projects, owing to the direct connection between socio-economic conditions and health and well-being.

=== Social franchising ===
The association launched its Catalytic Fund initiative in September 2013. The goal was to expand access to a range of sexual and reproductive health services among poor and under‑served communities through a social franchising network with mid‑level private providers. Social mobilizers conduct home visits and awareness sessions to familiarize the communities in coverage areas with the upgraded franchisee clinics. A report by International Planned Parenthood in 2015 stated that the franchise network saw an 11‑fold increase in the total number of sexual and reproductive health services provided, from about 2,000 in the first quarter to almost 24,000 in quarter five.
