= Community health worker =

Type of informal health care provider

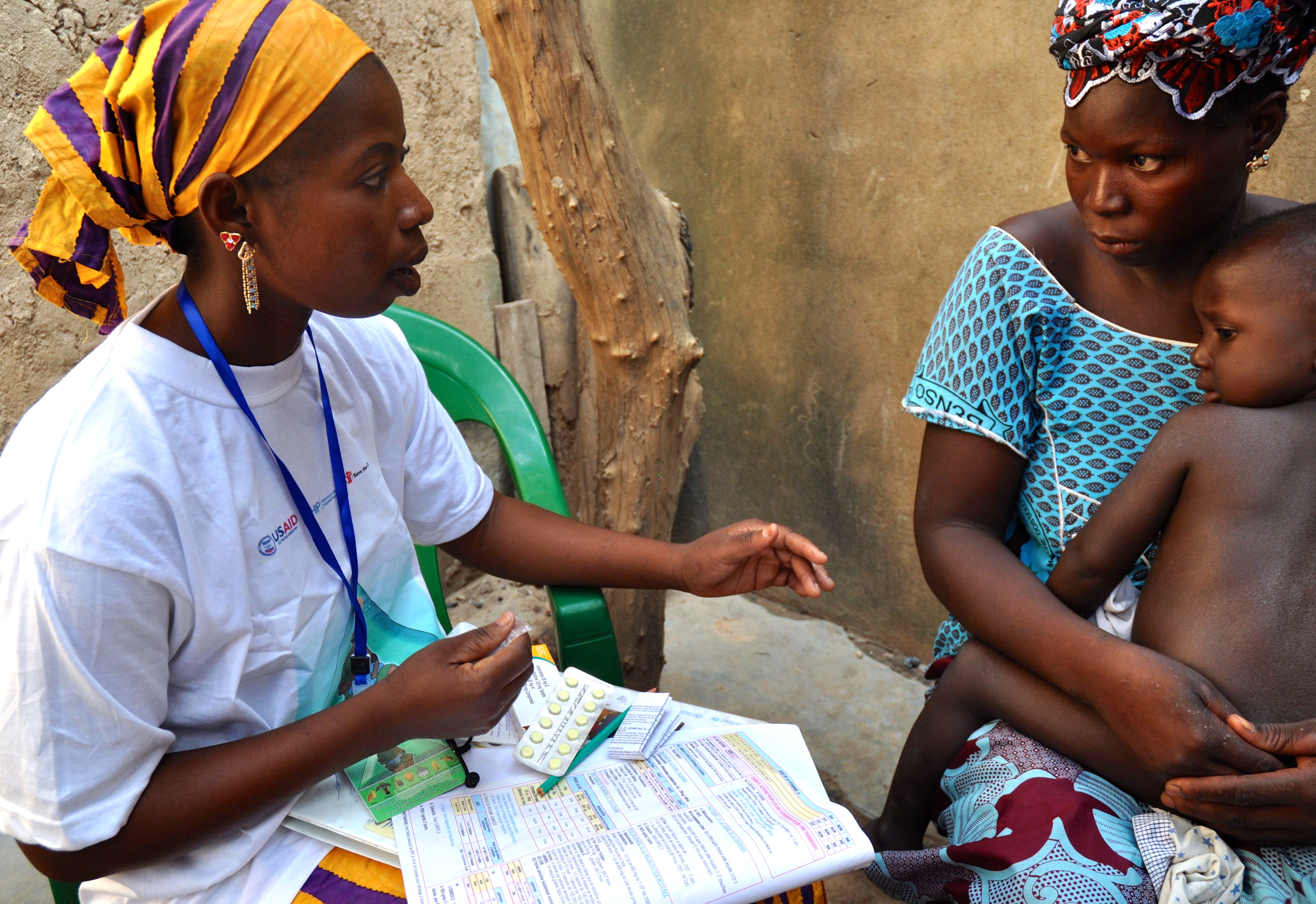
Delivery of malaria treatment by a community health worker in Djénébougou, Mali

A community health worker (CHW) is a member of a community who provides basic health and medical care within their community, and is capable of providing preventive, promotional and rehabilitation care to that community, typically without formal education equal to that of a nurse or doctor. A community health extension worker (CHEW) is a specially trained professional who provides similar preventive, curative and rehabilitative health care and services to people where they live and work. Other terms for this type of health care provider include lay health worker, village health worker, community health aide, community health promoter, and health advisor.

Community health officers contribute to community development and can help communities improve access to basic health services, especially when properly trained to provide information and services to the community. Community health officers often deliver health services to resource-constrained areas. They are seen as secondary health services in most low-income countries.

In many developing countries, especially in Sub-Saharan Africa, there are critical shortages of doctors. Current medical schools cannot train enough workers to keep up with increasing demand for health care services, internal and external emigration of health workers, deaths from AIDS and other diseases, low workforce productivity, and population growth. Community health officer are trained after completing their basic community health extension worker training in the colleges of health technologies, this training takes place in teaching hospitals that offers community health officer training to equip them with the knowledge to carry out more advanced health service in the rural areas. The community health officers work in primary health centre where they spent 70% of their time attending to patients and 30% in the community. community health officers can trained volunteer village health workers and community health workers chosen by the community that he or she works to help communicate with the local people. Programs involving community health officers in China, Brazil, Iran and Bangladesh have demonstrated that utilizing such officers can help improve health outcomes for large populations in under-served regions. "Task shifting" of primary care functions from professional health workers to volunteer village health is considered to be a means to make more efficient use of the human resources currently available and improving the health of millions at reasonable cost.

== Community health officer ==
Community health officers (CHO), also called mid-level health providers (MLHP) and non-physician practitioners, are trained health care providers who have a defined scope of practice. In India, only nurses and AYUSH practitioners are eligible for this cadre. This means that they are trained and legally permitted to provide healthcare in fewer situations than physicians but more than other health professionals.

Recently in India, community health officers at Ayushman Bharat Health and Wellness Centres are now allowed to supply certain medicines to the patients, as they have been included in Section 23 of Schedule K of Drugs and Cosmetics Rules, 1945. In India, community health officer (CHO) is another name for mid-level practitioner.

Ministry of Health and family welfare, Government of India published guidelines for prevention and controlling of COVID-19 cases in rural area of India. According to guidelines, symptomatic cases can be triaged at the village level by tele-consultation with a community health officer (CHO), and cases with comorbidity or low oxygen saturation should be sent to higher centres.

== History ==
It is unclear where the usage of community health workers began, although China and Bangladesh have been cited as possible origins. Melinda Gates, co-founder of the Bill & Melinda Gates Foundation, said the nongovernmental organization BRAC in Bangladesh "pioneered the community health worker model." Catherine Lovell writes that BRAC's decision to train locally recruited paramedics was "based on the Chinese barefoot doctor model then becoming known worldwide."

Scientific medicine has evolved slowly over the last few millennia and very rapidly over the last 150 years or so. As the evidence mounted of its effectiveness, belief and trust in the traditional ways waned. The rise of university-based medical schools, the increased numbers of trained physicians, the professional organizations they created, and the income and attendant political power they generated resulted in license regulations. Such regulations were effective in improving the quality of medical care but also resulted in a reduced supply of clinical care providers. This further increased the fees doctors could charge and encouraged them to concentrate in larger towns and cities where the population was denser, hospitals were more available, and professional and social relationships more convenient.

In the 1940s, Chairman Mao Zedong in China faced these problems. His anger at the "urban elite" medical profession over the maldistribution of medical services resulted in the creation of "barefoot doctors". Hundreds of thousands of rural peasants, chosen by their colleagues, were given rudimentary training and assigned medical and sanitation duties in addition to the collective labor they owed the commune. By 1977, there were over 1.7 million barefoot doctors. As professionally trained doctors and nurses became more available, the program was abolished in 1981 with the end of agricultural communes. Many barefoot doctors passed an examination and went to medical school. Many became health aides and some were relieved of duty.

Brazil undertook a medical plan named the Family Health Program in the 1990s that made use of large numbers of community health agents. Between 1990 and 2002, the infant mortality rate dropped from about 50 per 1000 live births to 29.2. During that period the Family Health Program increased its coverage of the population from 0 to 36%. The largest impact appeared to be a reduction of deaths from diarrhea. Though the program utilized teams of physicians, nurses and community health workers, it could not have covered the population it did without the community health worker. Additionally, there is evidence in Brazil that the shorter period of training does not reduce the quality of care. In one study workers with a shorter length of training complied with child treatment guidelines 84% of the time whereas those with longer training had 58% compliance.

Iran utilizes large numbers of para-professionals called behvarz. These workers are from the community and are based in 14,000 "health houses" nationwide. They visit the homes of the underserved providing vaccinations and monitoring child growth. Between 1984 and 2000 Iran was able to cut its infant mortality in half and raise immunization rates from 20 to 95%. The family planning program in Iran is considered highly successful. Fertility has dropped from 5.6-lifetime children per woman in 1985 to 2 in 2000. Though there are many elements to the program (including classes for those who marry and the ending of tax incentives for large families), behvarz are extensively involved in providing birth control advice and methods. The proportion of rural women on contraceptives in 2000 was 67%. The program resulted in a profound improvement in maternal mortality going from 140 per 100,000 in 1985 to 37 in 1996.

The Government of Liberia launched the National Community Health Assistant Program in 2016 to accelerate progress towards universal health coverage for the most vulnerable populations, especially those in remote communities. Liberia's program seeks to transform an existing cadre of unpaid and poorly coordinated community health workers into a more effective workforce by enhancing recruitment, supervision and compensation. The health ministry has organized a coalition of funding and implementation partners to support this new program, which aims to train, supervise, equip and pay 4000 Community Health Assistants, supported by 400 clinical supervisors, to extend primary care services to 1.2 million people living in remote rural communities.

== Scope of programs ==
The World Health Organization estimates there are over 1.3 million community health workers worldwide. In addition to the large-scale implementation by countries such as China, India, Brazil, and Iran, many countries have implemented community health worker programs in small-scale levels for a variety of health issues.

In India, 600,000 community health workers are paid through a fee-for-service system to deliver a specific set of primary care functions, such as immunization. They have also been found to be effective in delivering care for chronic conditions such as hypertension and diabetes, though there has been limited utilization of community health workers for these conditions. In addition, community health workers have been utilized to increase mental health service utilization and decrease stigma associated with mental illness. In this program respected female members of the community were chosen to participate. All of the women were married, came from a good social standing, displayed a keen interest in the program, and were encouraged by their family to participate. The women chosen were then trained in identification and referral of patients with mental illnesses, the common myths and misconceptions prevalent in the area and in conducting community surveys. The training lasted 3 days and included lectures, role plays and observation of patient interviews at the psychiatry outpatient department at St. John's Medical College Hospital. A population of 12,886 were surveyed using a brief questionnaire. Out of this population, 574 were suspected patients. Out of this 242 suspected patients visited the clinic after follow up from the community health worker. Also in India, The MINDS Foundation has developed a grassroots program targeted at providing mental health services to rural citizens. They leave the responsibility in the hands of local rural citizens who are trained as Community Mental Healthcare Workers (CMHWs).

In Tanzania, village health workers were part of a community-based safe-motherhood approach. The VHWs assisted pregnant women with birth planning, which included timely identification of danger signs, preparation, and accumulation of two or more essential supplies such as soap, razors, gloves for clean delivery, and mobilizing household resources, people and money to manage a possible emergency. Approximately one year after the CBRHP's major interventions ceased in these communities, most of the VHWs continued to do health promotion by visiting pregnant women, teaching them about birth planning and danger signs, and assisting them in obtaining both prenatal and obstetric services. Local VHW associations are forming with support from local political leaders, the Ministry of Health, and the non-governmental organization CARE to sustain the work of the VHWs. The community development officers, some of whom were also the master trainers, are involved in spearheading the formation of VHW organizations.

In Mali, community health workers with the Mali Health Organizing Project in Bamako have helped reduce child mortality (under 5 years old) in their community to less than 1%, compared to a national average of 19%.

The use of community health workers is not limited to developing countries. In New York, they have been deployed across the state to provide care to patients with chronic illnesses like diabetes that require sustained, comprehensive care. They work in both rural communities where access to primary care is sparse, and in urban communities where they are better able to bridge communication gaps that may arise between patients and doctors. They are seen to play an important role in assisting patients with navigating a complex, uncoordinated health care system. In Philadelphia, a standardized intervention was used by community health workers across multiple systems provided evidence of increased patient-perceived quality of care and hospitalization reduction among low-income populations.

A randomized controlled intervention on the U.S.-Mexico border, used promotoras or "female promoters" to increase the number of women utilizing routine preventive examinations. The control group received a postcard reminding women to get a preventive screening. The free comprehensive clinical exam included a Pap test, a clinical breast exam, human papillomavirus (HPV) testing, blood draw for total cholesterol and blood glucose, and a blood pressure measurement. The other group received the same postcard and a follow-up visit from a promotora. The group that was followed up by a promotora saw a 35% increase in visits to get the free screening.

A program in Karnataka, India took a slightly different approach now referred to as the "link worker" model. The Samastha project developed a network in which trained workers, village health committees, government facilities, people living with HIV (PLHIV) networks, and participating NGOs collaborated to improve recruitment and retention of PLHIV while strengthening and supporting their adherence to treatment. Link workers were PLHIV who were selected by Samastha from a small number of HIV-positive candidates proposed by their community; they received an allowance for their work. The link workers' key tasks revolved around prevention, stigma reduction, and support for PLHIV that included adherence support to both treatment and care. Ultimately, the link workers' coordinating role became a hallmark of Samastha's interventions in high prevalence rural areas. Link workers formed the essential connection between PLHIV, government and community structures, and HIV care and treatment services, commonly accompanying persons from their catchment area to these services.

Community health workers have also been utilized to assist in research. Martin et al. found that the Latin-American population in the United States frequently does not benefit from health programs due to language barriers, distrust of the government, and unique health beliefs and practices, and specifically that providing effective asthma care to the Latino population is an enormous challenge. In addition, they found that Latinos are also often excluded from research due to a lack of validated research instruments in Spanish, unsuccessful study recruitment, and a limited number of Latino researchers. Thus, Martin and colleagues decided to use community health workers to recruit participants. To gauge the effectiveness of their recruitment strategy to other more traditional recruitment models they looked at two studies. Both these studies offered significant monetary incentives for participation while the community health worker study offered nothing for the initial participation. Martin et al. found that individuals who chose not to participate in the study went on to receive other services in the areas of diabetes and cancer prevention, which was not the case for the other studies.

In the Philippines, community health workers are known as barangay health volunteers. With the decentralization of healthcare through the 1991 Local Government Code, the responsibility of delivery of primary health services were transferred from the central government to locally elected provincial, city, and municipal governments. They provide preventive health services and treatments, especially for the poor.

Community health workers play a variety of critical roles in pandemic response.

== Current status ==
Cost and access to medical care remain problems of worldwide scope. They are particularly severe in the developing world and it is estimated one million more health care workers are needed in Africa to meet the health-related Millennium Development Goals. Doctors are few and concentrated in cities. In Uganda, some 70% of medical doctors and 40% of nurses and midwives are based in urban areas, serving only 12% of the population. Medical training is long and expensive. It is estimated that to meet health workforce needs using the American or European model, Africa would need to build 300 medical schools with a total training cost of over $33 billion and it would take over 20 years just to catch up. In many countries the salaries of doctors and nurses are less than that of engineers and teachers. Bright young medical professionals often leave practice for more lucrative opportunities. Emigration of trained personnel to countries with higher salaries is high. In Zambia of the 600 doctors trained since independence, it is estimated only 50 practice in their home country. In some countries, AIDS is killing experienced nurses and doctors amounting to 30-50% of the number trained yearly. Though many countries have increased their spending on health care and foreign money has been injected, much of it has been on specific disease-oriented programs. Health systems remain extremely weak, especially in rural areas. The World Health Assembly in 2006 called for, "A health workforce which is matched in number, knowledge and skillsets to the needs of the population and which contributes to the achievement of health outcomes by utilizing a range of innovative methods".

Community health workers are thought to be part of the answer. They can be trained to do specialized tasks such as provide sexually transmitted disease counseling, directly observed therapy for tuberculosis control, or act as trained birth attendants. Others work on specific programs performing limited medical evaluations and treatment. Others have a far broader primary care function. With training, monitoring, supervision, and support such workers have been shown to be able to achieve outcomes far better than baseline and in some studies, better than physicians.

Important attributes of community health workers are to be a member of and chosen by the community they serve. This means they are easily accepted by their fellows and have natural cultural awareness. This is crucial because many communities are disengaged from the formal health system. In Sub-Saharan Africa, 53% of the poorest households do not seek care outside the home. Barriers include clinic fees, distance, community beliefs and the perception of the skills and attitudes of medical clinic workers. Community health workers are unable to emigrate because they do not have internationally recognized qualifications. Finally, the variation in incentives between areas of the country tends to below. All these factors combined with strong community ties, tend to result in retention at the community level.

Much remains to be learned about the recruitment, training, functions, incentives, retention and professional development of community health workers. Learning developed in one country may not be applicable to another due to cultural differences. Health worker adaptability to local requirements and needs is key to improving medical outcomes. That being said, it has been estimated that six million children's lives a year could be saved if 23 evidence-based interventions were provided systematically the children living in the 42 countries responsible for 90% of childhood mortality. Over 50% of this benefit could be obtained with an integrated, high-coverage, family-community care based system. Community health workers may be an integral and crucial component of the health human resources team needed to achieve such goals.

== See also ==
- Health care providers
- Health human resources
- Barangay health workers
- Community health agent
- Global mental health
- Lady Health Worker
- Health extension officer
- Physician shortage
- 5-SPICE Framework
