= Imelda Park =

Imelda Park has referred to multiple locations.

== Philippines ==
- Baguio Botanical Garden
- MacArthur Landing Memorial National Park
- The site of the Socorro Water Towers
