= Sitio =

Territorial enclave in the Philippines

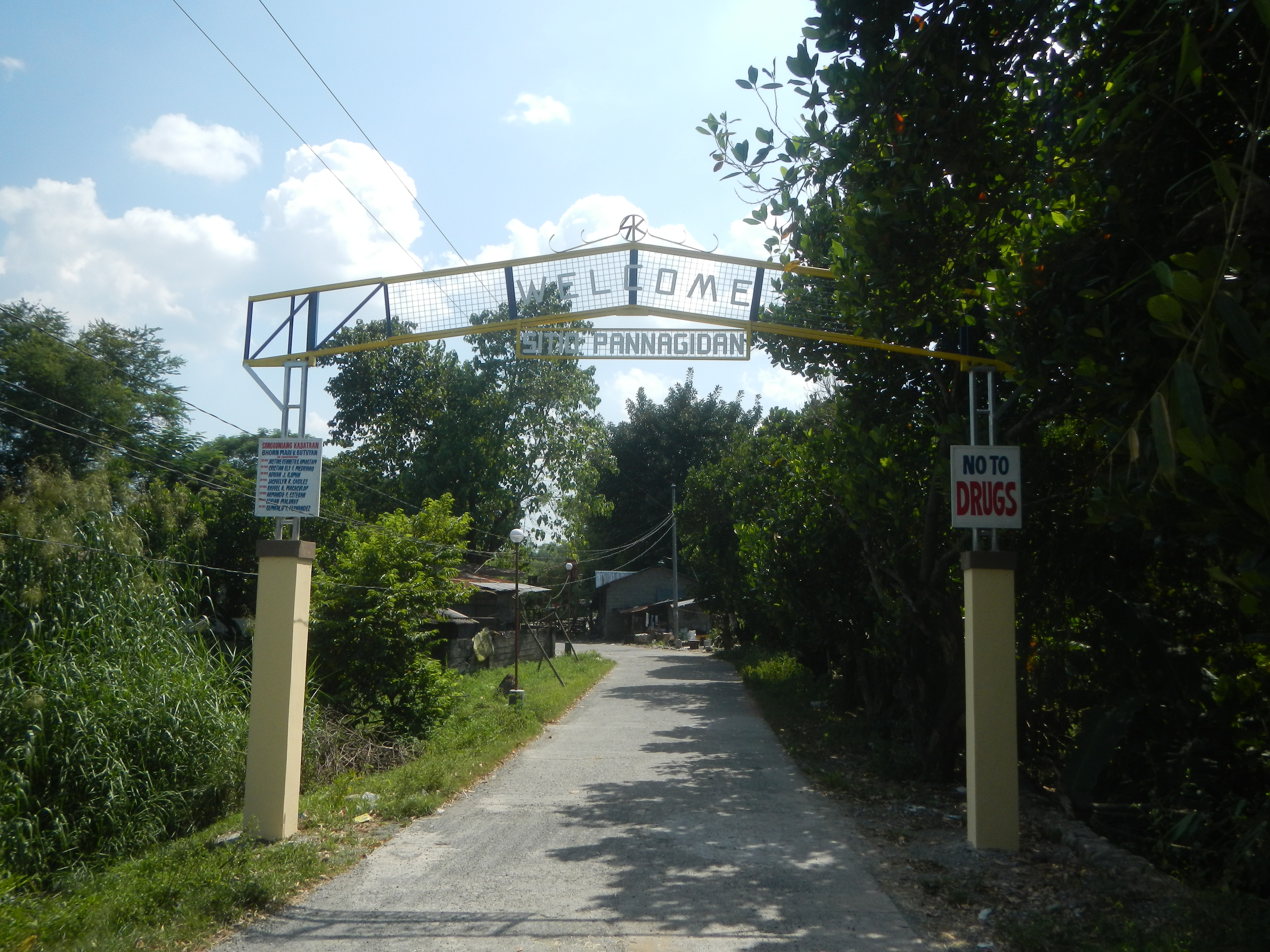
- Welcome arch of a sitio
- Location: Philippines
- Found in: Barangay

A sitio (Spanish for "site") in the Philippines is a territorial enclave that forms part of a barangay. Typically rural, a sitio's location is usually far from the center of the barangay itself and could be its own barangay if its population were high enough. Sitios are similar to puroks, but the latter are more urban and closer to the center of the barangay, especially the barangay hall. The term is derived from the Spanish word sitio meaning "place".

During the Spanish colonial period the colonial government employed the reducción policy, allowing the remapping of various settlements. Several far-flung hamlets were identified, named, and organized into "sitios" so that municipalities and cities could more easily be governed through the barangay system, then known as the barrio system. A sitio does not have an independent administration; it is established purely for organizational purposes only.

== See also ==
- Purok
- Poblacion
- Barangay
- Philippine legal codes
