= Socorro, Quezon City =

Barangay in Quezon City, Metro Manila, Philippines

Socorro
- Barangay
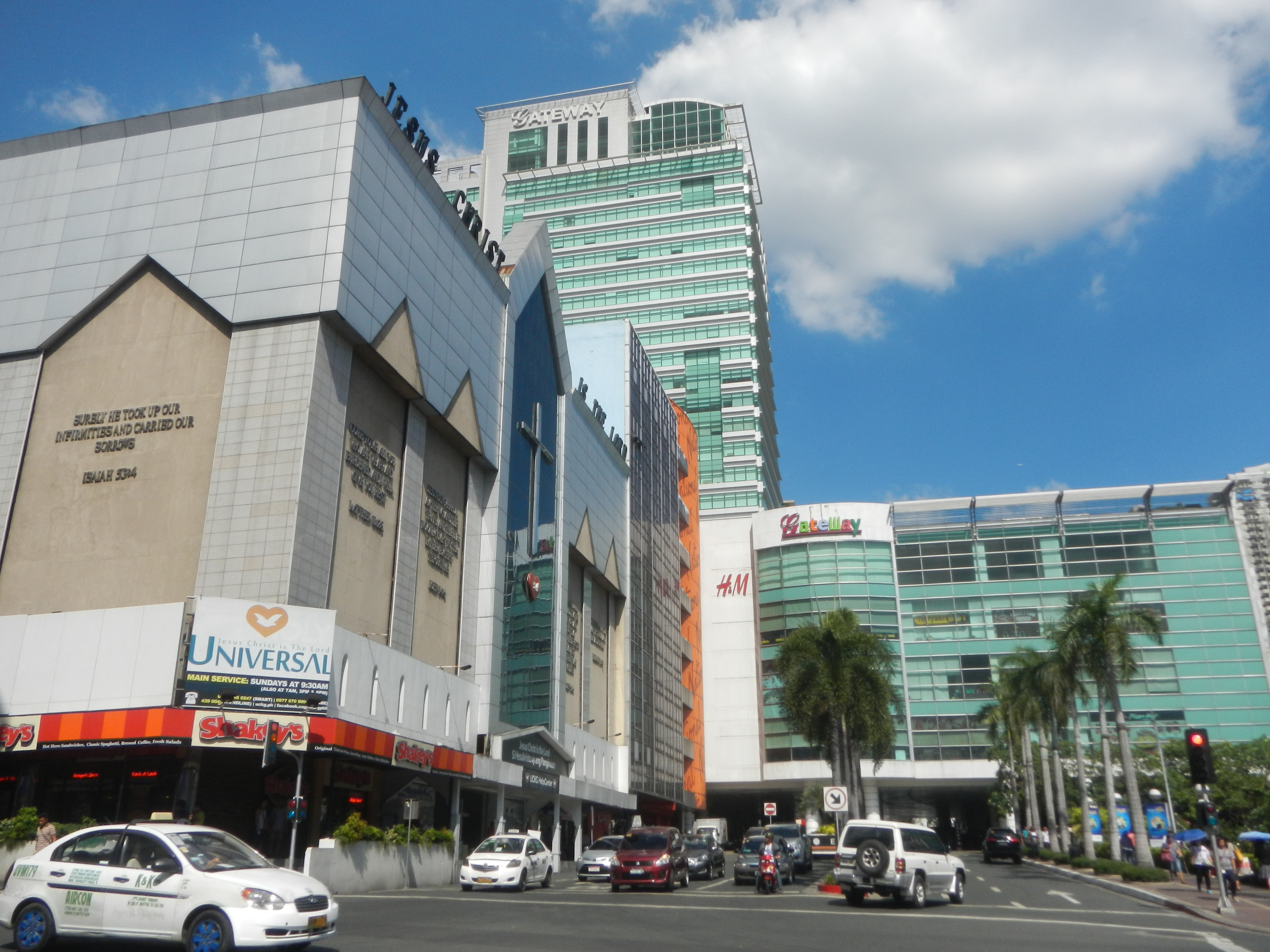
- Araneta City

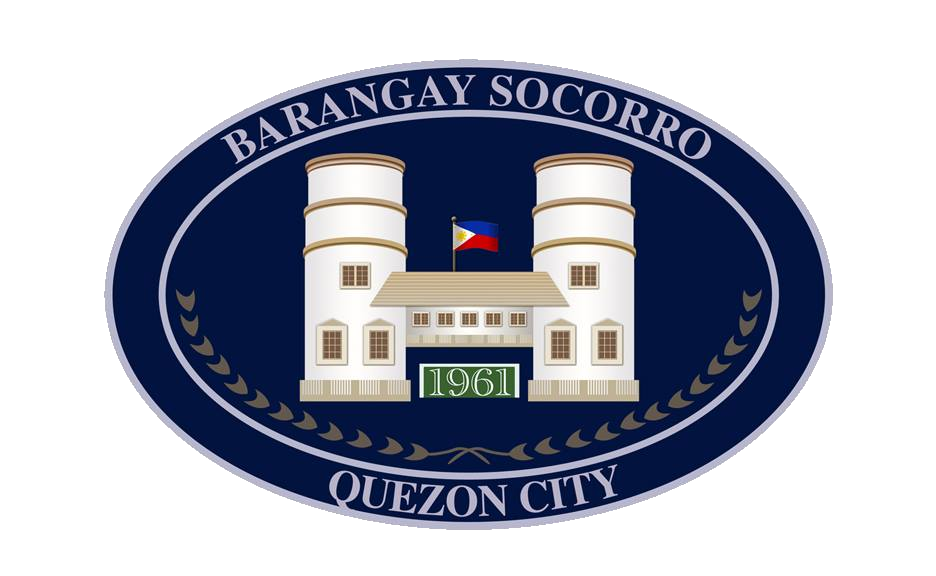
- Seal
- Nickname: Cubao
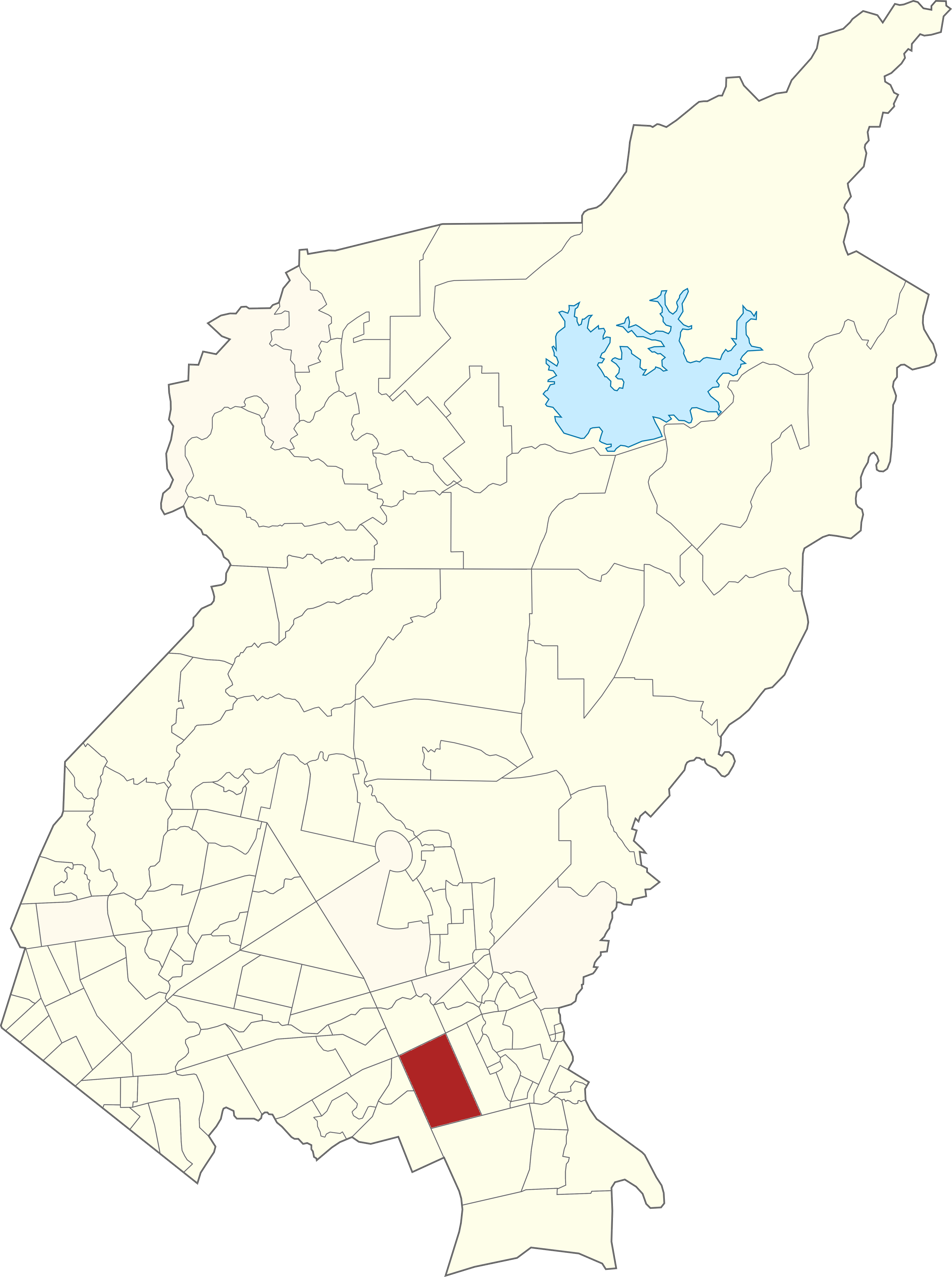
- Map showing Socorro in Quezon City

- Location of Socorro within Metro Manila
- Coordinates: 14°37′04.3″N 121°03′20.7″E
- Country: Philippines
- Region: National Capital Region
- City: Quezon City
- District: 2nd District
- Established (as barrio): November 6, 1961
- Declared as barangay: September 21, 1974

Government
  - Type: Barangay council
  - Barangay Captain: Dr. Teodulo "Ted" Santos

Area
  - Total: 115.6968 ha (285.893 acres)

Population (2019)
  - Total: 25,073
- Time zone: UTC+8 (PST)
- ZIP Code: 1109
- Area code: 02

Socorro (PSGC: 137404115) is a barangay located in Quezon City, Philippines, within the commercial district of Cubao. As of the 2019 census, the barangay has a population of 25,073 people. The barangay is home to Araneta City and Smart Araneta Coliseum, one of the largest indoor arenas in the world.

== Etymology ==
Socorro, derived from the Portuguese-Spanish word socorro ("succor"), which means "help" or "relief", is named after its patron saint, Our Lady of Perpetual Help.

== History ==
Socorro Water Towers

Barrio Socorro was established on November 6, 1961, pursuant to City Ordinance No. 61–4883, signed and issued by Norberto S. Amoranto, the then mayor of Quezon City. It was created as a barangay on September 21, 1974, pursuant to Presidential decree no. 557 of President Ferdinand Marcos, 'declaring all barrios in the Philippines as barangays'. By the enactment of Republic Act No. 7160 (Local Government Code), the barangay was given more powers, duties, and responsibilities as the most basic government unit.

On June 25, 1975, Camp Aguinaldo was separated from Socorro to become a separate barangay by virtue of through Executive Order No. 29 signed by Mayor Amoranto.

== Geography ==
Socorro is located in the southeastern section of Quezon City. It is bounded to the north by Aurora Boulevard (R-6), separating it from Barangay E. Rodriguez; to the south by Bonny Serrano Avenue, separating it from Camp Aguinaldo; to the east by 15th Avenue, separating it from Barangay San Roque; and to the west by EDSA (C-4), separating it from Barangays San Martin de Porres and Bagong Lipunan ng Crame. The area has a total of 115.6968 hectares (285.893 acres).

== Government ==
=== Seat ===
The seat of government of Socorro is located at 15th Avenue cor. Bonny Serrano Avenue. It is built within a property of MWSS, beside the two water tanks, which was built approximately in 1930s before World War II.

=== Barangay council ===
The current barangay captain is Teodulo "Ted" Santos.

Title	Name
Barangay Captain (Punong Barangay)	Teodulo "Ted" Santos
Secretary	Jade C. Silva
Treasurer	Ma. Carmela Julia D. Ronquillo
Sangguniang Kabataan Chairperson	Jeanettelyn M. Lozano
Barangay councilors Kagawad
Barangay councilors Kagawad	Engilbert L. Bangal
Barangay councilors Kagawad	Famela B. Galang
Barangay councilors Kagawad	Maria Isabel D. Mesia
Barangay councilors Kagawad	Mark Adrienne A. Constantino
Barangay councilors Kagawad	Bonifacio C. Rillon Jr.
Barangay councilors Kagawad	Ronald P. Espulgar
Barangay councilors Kagawad	Leonido G. Mendoza

=== Seal ===
The seal of Barangay Socorro features the twin pre-war water tanks, the flag of the Philippines, and the year when Socorro was established. It is used to authenticate certain documents issued by the barangay government, such as barangay clearance.

Seal editions of the government of Barangay Socorro
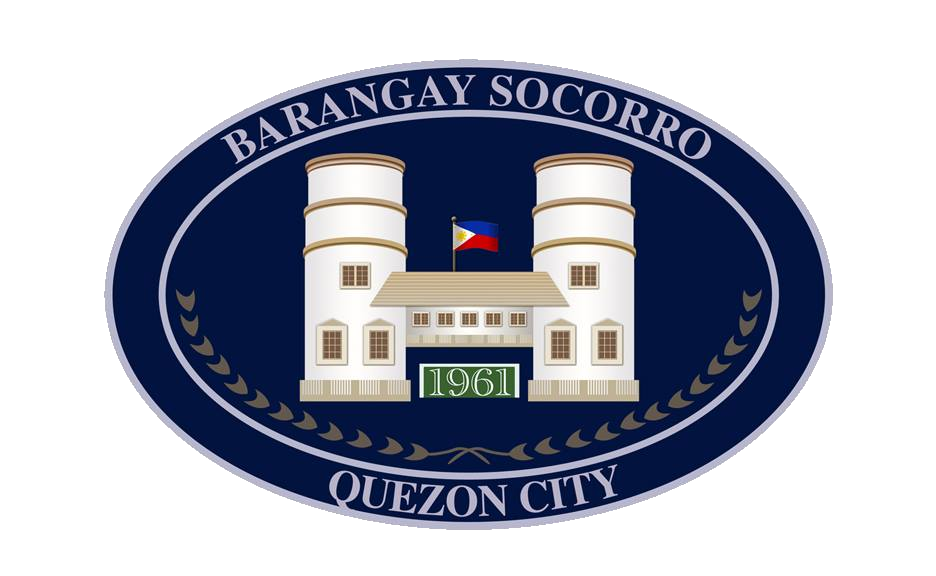
Official seal used in official documents

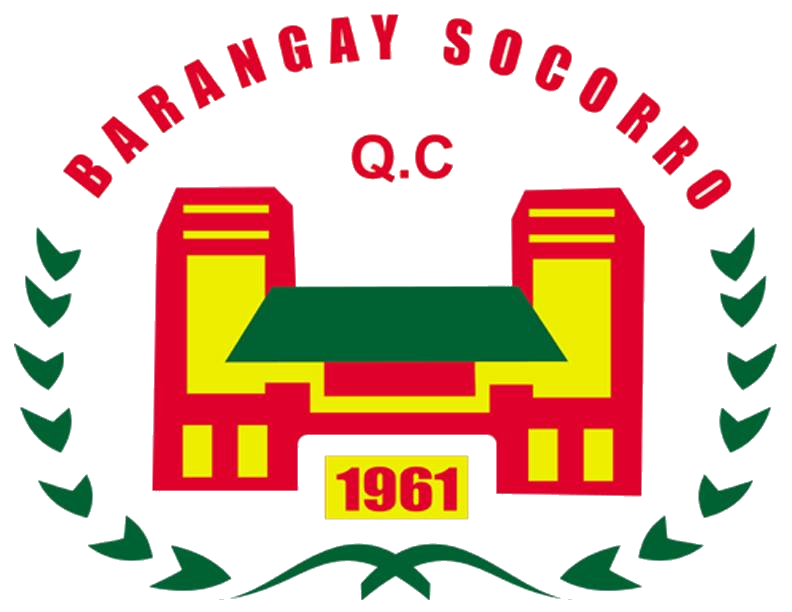

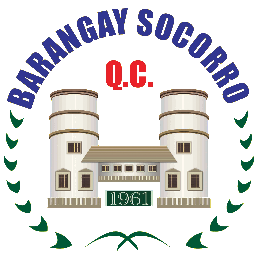

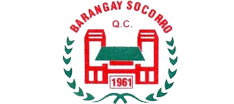

== Schools ==
School	Address
15th Avenue Elementary School	139 15th Ave, Cubao, Quezon City
ABE International College of Business and Accountancy (Cubao Campus)	878 Rempson Bldg., Aurora Blvd., Cubao, Quezon City
STI College - Cubao	STI Academic Center Cubao, P. Tuazon Blvd. corner 5th Ave., Cubao, Quezon City
Pail and Shovel Integrated School	107 14th Avenue, Murphy, Cubao, Quezon City
Starland International School (Cubao Branch)	93 12th Avenue, Cubao, Quezon City

== Landmarks ==
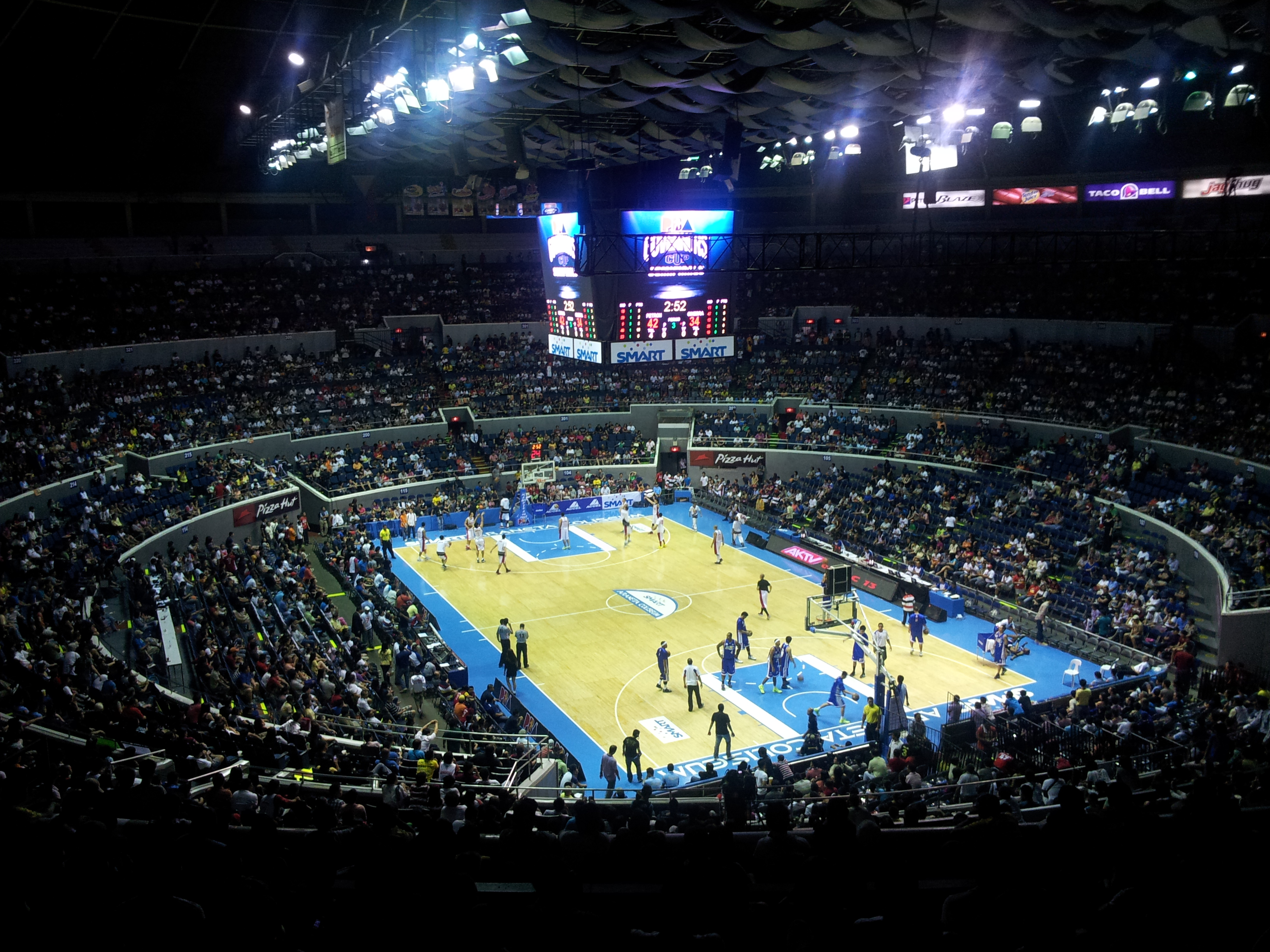
The Araneta Coliseum, one of the biggest indoor domes in the world

- Araneta Coliseum
- Araneta City
- Barangay hall and the twin pre-World War II water tanks

== Places of Worship ==
- Our Lady of Perpetual Help Parish
- Iglesia ni Cristo – Murphy Locale
- Radiance of Christ Ministries
- Christ to the Philippines – Murphy Church
- Church of the Nazarene – Central
- Church of the Lord of Hosts
- International Christian Life Center
- New Life Ministries
- UCKG HelpCentre Philippines

== Transportation ==
West from Araneta City along EDSA (C-4) are numerous bus terminals, which serves buses to most places in Luzon, Visayas, and Mindanao. There is also a bus terminal and a jeepney terminal built inside the commercial center. Socorro, as part of Cubao is an intersection point for two of Quezon City's commuter train lines (the MRT Line 3 and the LRT Line 2).
