= Jaime Bayona =

Peruvian physician

Jaime Bayona García is a Peruvian physician who focuses on public health and he has become a specialist in studying the epidemiology of tuberculosis. He is also known for his case studies on HIV/AIDS in Peru and other developing countries. Dr. Bayona has also done work on how public health systems should improve, in terms of providing the best approach to help the sick that cannot afford health care.

== Involvement in Peru ==
In 1994, Bayona was recruited in Peru to become the director of Socios en Salud (SES); a sister organization of Partners in Health (PIH) that started in Lima, Peru, to treat multidrug-resistant tuberculosis (MDR-TB) and HIV/AIDS in patients, and to provide health care to the poor who live in limited-resource environments. Once he became the director of SES, he had to manage a large group of 150 and growing staff of community health workers along with keeping up to date with NIH grants (National Institutes of Health).

== Demonstrating MDR-TB efforts in Peru ==
Bayona, with Jim Yong Kim and Paul Farmer, worked on expanding MDR-TB treatment in Peru but were threatened by the Peruvian government to stop or leave the country. They knew it would be important to build a strong relationship with the Peruvian government if they were going to treat MDR-TB patients under government policy. Community health workers under Dr. Bayona continued to observe their patients regardless of the Peruvian government's warning. Community health workers gave emotional support and observed patients taking their medications. Community health workers noted any side effects the patients had and reported the information to doctors so appropriate changes could be made. Patients were asked to be on medications for longer periods if necessary. Fifty patients were cured by community health workers under Dr. Bayona. The cure rate reached above 80 percent. Bayona, Kim and Farmer convinced the Peruvian government, along with the World Health Organization, to reconsider the usage of these medications for MDR-TB and they reformed their policies.

In 1996, Bayona asked the Ministry of Health of Peru (MINSA) to provide second-line drugs for a group of ten patients to treat MDR-TB. MINSA is a branch of the Peruvian government. Bayona was turned away because MINSA believed that instead of treating the disease, it should instead be prevented. Costs for second-line drugs were costly, so a strategy for prevention of MDR-TB was the preferred option according to MINSA. Farmer, Kim, and Bayona campaigned for second-line prescriptions through the course of a few gatherings. They orchestrated with MINSA and Pedro Guillermo Suárez, who is a physician and the director of the National TB Program (NTP). Suárez was against treating MDR-TB patients due to the high costs and high probability of treatment failure. Bayona then traveled to the Cono Norte's hospital in 1996 to introduce himself to Felix Alcántara. Dr. Alcántara is a pulmonologist at the Cono Norte's hospital and was on board to help with tuberculosis management due to his beliefs that the NTP treatments were not working. According to Kim, "Jaime was absolutely committed to these patients—to make sure these patients would get on treatment, and he was navigating incredibly tricky political waters". Bayona continued to work with MINSA to change their approach and bring together other organizational entities to collaborate. Again in 1996, Bayona organized a gathering with Suárez, Alcántara, and others from the local medical clinic in Peru. For the first time, an agreement was finalized between SES, the Peruvian NTP, and PIH which took into account the treatment of 10 MDR-TB patients to begin their work. Throughout testing, treatment for MDR-TB relied on the development of the drug susceptibility. Bayona received approval for SES to gain access to two adjoining zones that the Cono Norte's hospital supported. Permission was also given to treat more individuals within these two zones.
