= Socorro Water Towers =

Historic water towers in Quezon City, Metro Manila, Philippines

- The towers’ eastern sides, from 15th Avenue
- Interactive map of the Socorro Water Towers area

General information
- Status: Completed
- Type: Water tower complex
- Location: Barangay Socorro Hall, 15th Avenue corner Bonny Serrano Avenue, Barangay Socorro, Cubao, Quezon City, Philippines
- Coordinates: 14°36′46.4″N 121°03′45.0″E
- Current tenants: Barangay Government of Socorro
- Completed: 1930s
- Closed: 1950s (function as water towers)
- Owner: Metropolitan Waterworks and Sewerage System

The Socorro Water Towers are historic water towers in the barangay of Socorro in Quezon City, Metro Manila, Philippines.

== History ==
The Socorro Water Towers were built in the 1930s, during the United States administration of the Philippines. The complex consists of two water towers, with the newer structure being built a year apart and has smaller dimensions than the older tower. The towers were built to serve residents of modern-day Cubao area.

The water towers survived World War II and sometime after the Philippines regained independence in 1946, the structures and the associated property were turned over to the National Waterworks and Sewerage Authority (Nawasa; later the Metropolitan Waterworks and Sewerage System, MWSS). By the 1950s, the water towers became non-operational. Following the creation of barangay Socorro in the following decade, its barangay hall was allowed to be built within the water towers property with the help of First Lady Imelda Marcos. The adjoining playground was then named Imelda Mini-Park in her honour. One of the towers later sustained two holes during the 1989 coup d'état attempt against President Corazon Aquino, but the damage was repaired afterwards.

== Facilities ==
The Socorro Water Towers are two cylindrical concrete towers estimated to be 12 to 15 storeys high. The base of the towers hosts spaces for the local government of Barangay Socorro, including the main barangay hall built in the space between the towers. Behind the towers are a covered basketball court and local daycare center.
