= Mali Health =

- Abbreviation: MHOP
- Formation: 2006
- Type: NGO
- Legal status: 501 (c)(3)
- Location: Bamako, Mali Cambridge, Massachusetts
- Region served: West Africa
- Official language: Bambara, French, English
- Key people: Caitlin Cohen, Founder; Kris Ansin, US Executive Director; Mariam Fofana Diallo, National Director; Diakardia Traore, Medical Advisor
- Website: Mali Health

Mali Health, established in 2006, is a non-governmental organization with 501(c)(3) status that works to enable communities in Mali, Africa to design, build and implement their own health care systems through:

- Fostering the agency of residents to address community health needs
- Promoting health education, prevention, and early care-seeking
- Enhancing financial, geographic, and cultural access to quality health care for poor families

== Maternal and child health in Mali ==
One of the 10 poorest countries in the world, Mali's life expectancy at birth is 55 years. Nearly 50% of the population of 16,455,903 is under 14 years of age and Mali has the second highest birth rate in the world, making high maternal and child mortality a national crisis. In Mali, 1 and 5 children die before their 5th birthday, mostly from five treatable, preventable diseases: malaria, diarrhea, acute respiratory tract infections, measles, and malnutrition. The infant mortality rate (death before 1 year of age) is 104.3 deaths/1000 births, the second highest in the world. Only 27% of children under 5 sleep beneath insecticide-treated mosquito nets—one of the most effective ways to treat malaria—and only 34.8% of children under 5 years with fever receive treatment with any type of antimalarial medication.

In 2014, high maternal mortality (1 in 22 women die in childbirth) led Save the Children to rate Mali the 3rd worst country to be a mother in 2014. Only 52% of births among women aged 15–19 are attended by a skilled health professional.

Mali is dependent on international development organizations and foreign missionary groups for much of its health care. The total expenditure on health makes up only 7% of the national GDP and Mali has 0.1 hospital beds per 1,000 people. This health crisis is compounded by high levels of poverty—over 50% of the population lives on less than $1 a day (PPP)—and low levels of literacy, with a literacy rate of 39%.

== History ==
Mali Health was founded in Sikoro, a slum community on the outskirts of Bamako, Mali by C.(aitlin) Lee Cohen, Lindsay Ryan and Erica Trauba, students at Brown University who had previously volunteered in Bamako.

Cohen, Ryan and Trauba believed that the role of an international development organization is to foster rather than replace local groups and government action. Similarly, Mouhammadoun (Modibo) Niang, Rokia Savané (vice-president of Coordination Des Associations Et ONG Feminines Du Mali), Siriki Coulibaly (adviser to Sikoro's chief and the town's official representative to Mali Health) and numerous other leaders in Sikoro were frustrated by a history of failed projects, including a huge aid-agency water project that left the community without water, without the $30,000 they had contributed, and without many children, as many died due to iron contamination.

== Programs ==
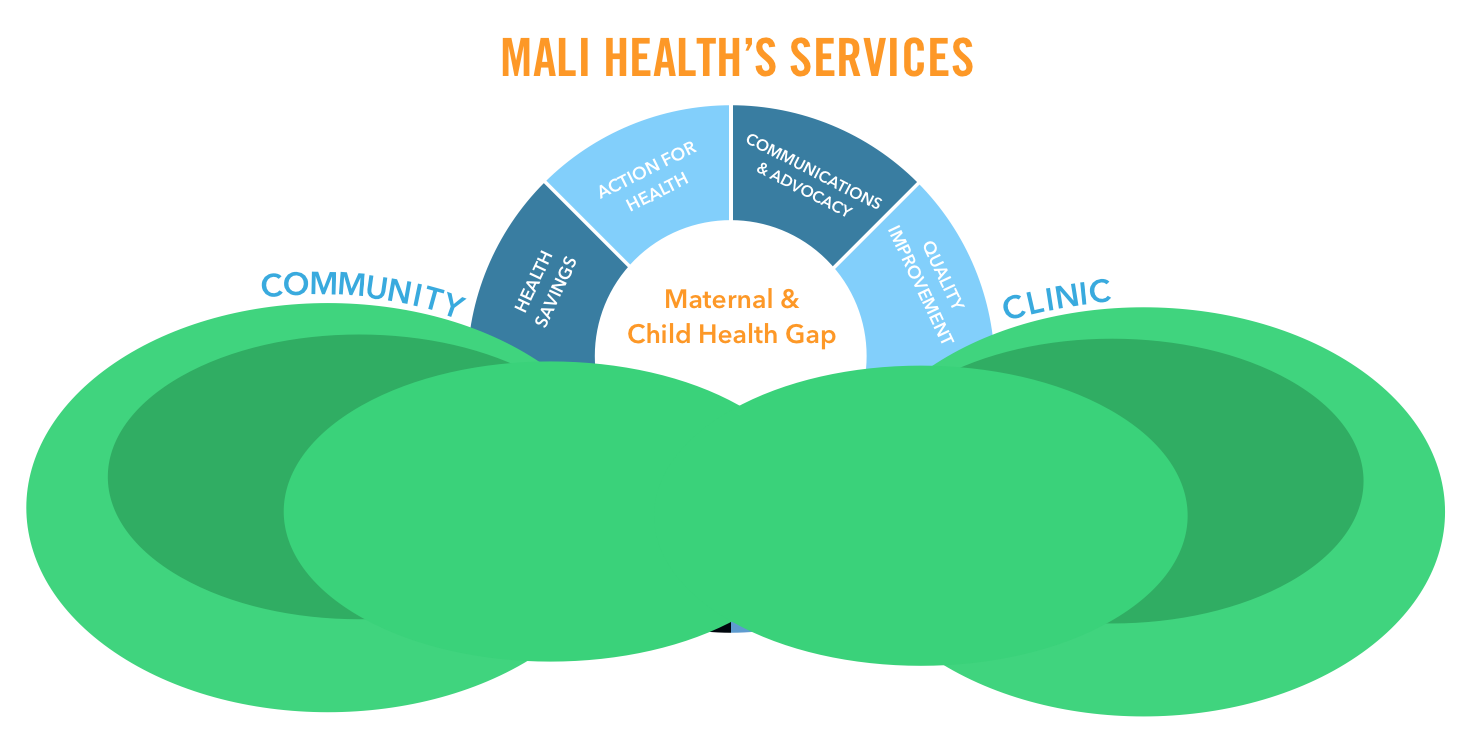
A graphic showing Mali Health's programs.

=== Action for Health ===
In 2008 the international NGO Médecins Sans Frontières (Doctors Without Borders) estimated that free malaria testing and treatment dramatically increased the number of people surviving the disease, and the World Health Organization's 2010 World Health Report concluded that direct payments are a major obstacle to health coverage in low income countries.

However, user fees—in which patients pay money for services at a clinic or hospital—remain one of the largest barriers to health care for the poor in developing countries. Through its program Action for Health, Mali Health seeks to help families who are unable to afford health care for their children. Focusing on the first 1,000 days of life, when development is the most critical and the most vulnerable, Action for Health children receive subsidized primary care. Mali Health's Community Health Workers visit enrolled families to monitor children's health and provide health education on issues such as malaria and malnutrition.

After launching in 2010, the program grew quickly and now serves almost 2,000 children. The program has had success in increasing care-seeking and childhood survival rates: while the average Malian child visits a doctor once every four years, children in Action for Health average 2-3 visits per year.

=== Communications & Advocacy ===
The Communications & Advocacy Program aims to bring health education to the masses and incite relevant and productive discussions about health topics that directly affect communities. Mali Health employs a number of media to generate these discussions. Health Radio (included in Sustainia's 2014 list of 100 of the most sustainable solutions to community development) mobilizes community members around health and promotes health education and prevention. The show is broadcast by local announcers on Bamako’s most popular radio station, which serves one million listeners weekly.
