= Tanod =

Village watchman in the Philippines

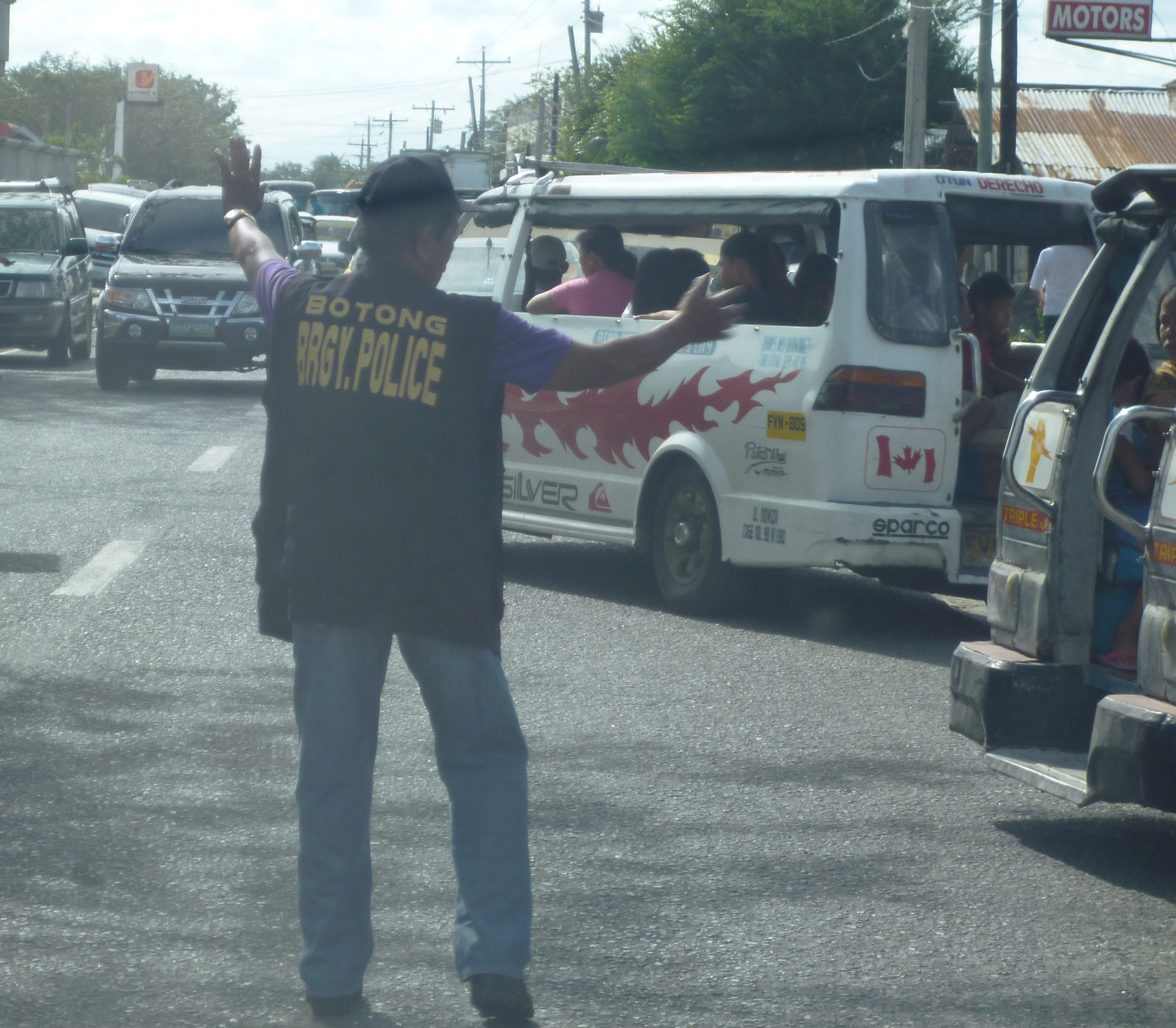
- A tanod directing traffic in Oton, Iloilo, February 2013

Occupation
- Activity sectors: Security

Description
- Related jobs: Security guard, Police officer

A barangay tanod, also known as a barangay police officer – and sometimes as BPSO (which can stand for barangay public safety officer, barangay peacekeeping and security officer, or barangay police safety officer) – is the lowest level of law enforcement officer in the Philippines. They primarily serve as watchmen for a barangay but also perform a variety of functions, supervised by the barangay captain. Tanods are:

"front liners in the preparation and response to any type of atrocities, public disorders, emergencies and even disasters or man-made calamities that threaten peace and order and public safety."

They may be unarmed or armed with a baton or bolo knife (a type of machete).

== Duties ==
While tanods cooperate with the Philippine National Police (PNP), they are not a part of the PNP. They do not have the same authority as police officers and cannot arrest suspected criminals. Rather, tanods augment the police and fulfill "certain functions which the police force cannot immediately discharge especially with respect to the implementation of national and local laws within barangays" and are relegated to small-scale disputes the police would not normally handle. The Local Government Code of the Philippines sets out the basic duties and responsibilities of a tanod. The Department of the Interior and Local Government provides training and a fuller definition of the tanod's duties.

Tanods may also either be unarmed or armed with simply a baton or a bolo knife, the latter a type of machete. They are not officially armed with guns, though some do carry arms. Those who do carry a gun may have obtained a private license as a private citizen and not as part of their official tanod duties; others carrying firearms while on duty may be deemed as doing so illegally.

While often described as volunteers, tanods may be receiving some payment and other benefits paid out of the barangay's, municipality's, or city's funds, most of which would come from the Internal Revenue Allotment supplemented by other sources. Tanods in different parts of the country may be receiving different pay rates and benefits, being dependent on the wealth as well as needs of their local communities. In Cebu City, the city government permits each barangay to pay a tanod an "honorarium" of 4,000 pesos per month. In other places, tanods only receive 300 pesos per month.

In 2004, there were over 700,000 tanods. (There are about 140,000 personnel of the Philippine National Police.) The number of tanods per barangay varies, however, from city to city or from municipality to municipality. The city of Cebu authorizes each barangay to hire up to 20 tanods. In 2011, the city of Baguio, with a population of approximately 325,000, had 392 tanods across 88 barangays, or an average of 4.5 per barangay. In Cagayan de Oro, there are 950 tanods across 56 barangays, or about an average of 17 per barangay. In the province of Southern Leyte, there were 3,452 tanods as of 2012.

== History ==
Tanods were well established even before the passage of the current Local Government Code of 1991.

== Gallery ==
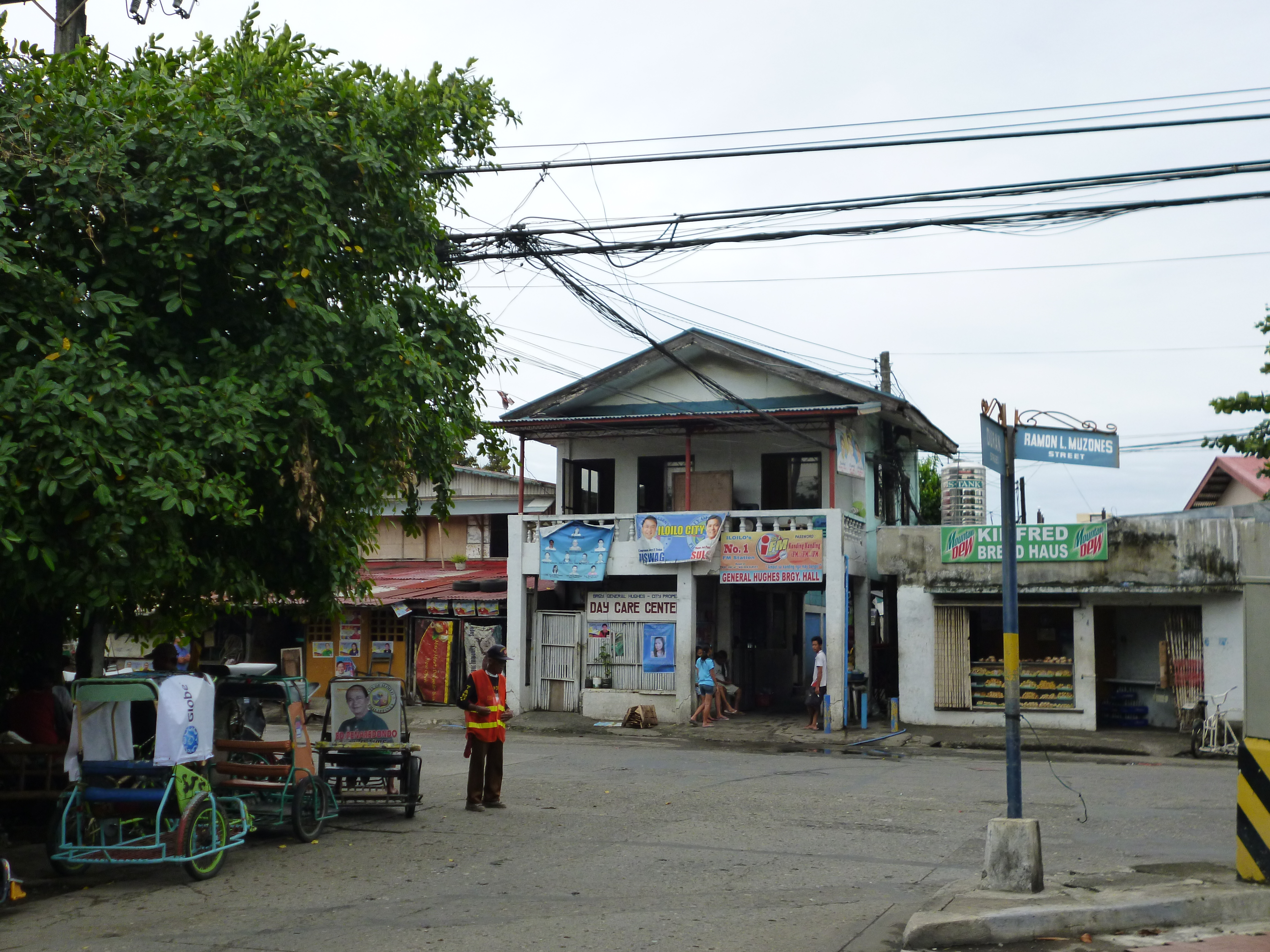
A tanod outside the barangay hall of Brgy. General Hughes, City Proper, Iloilo City

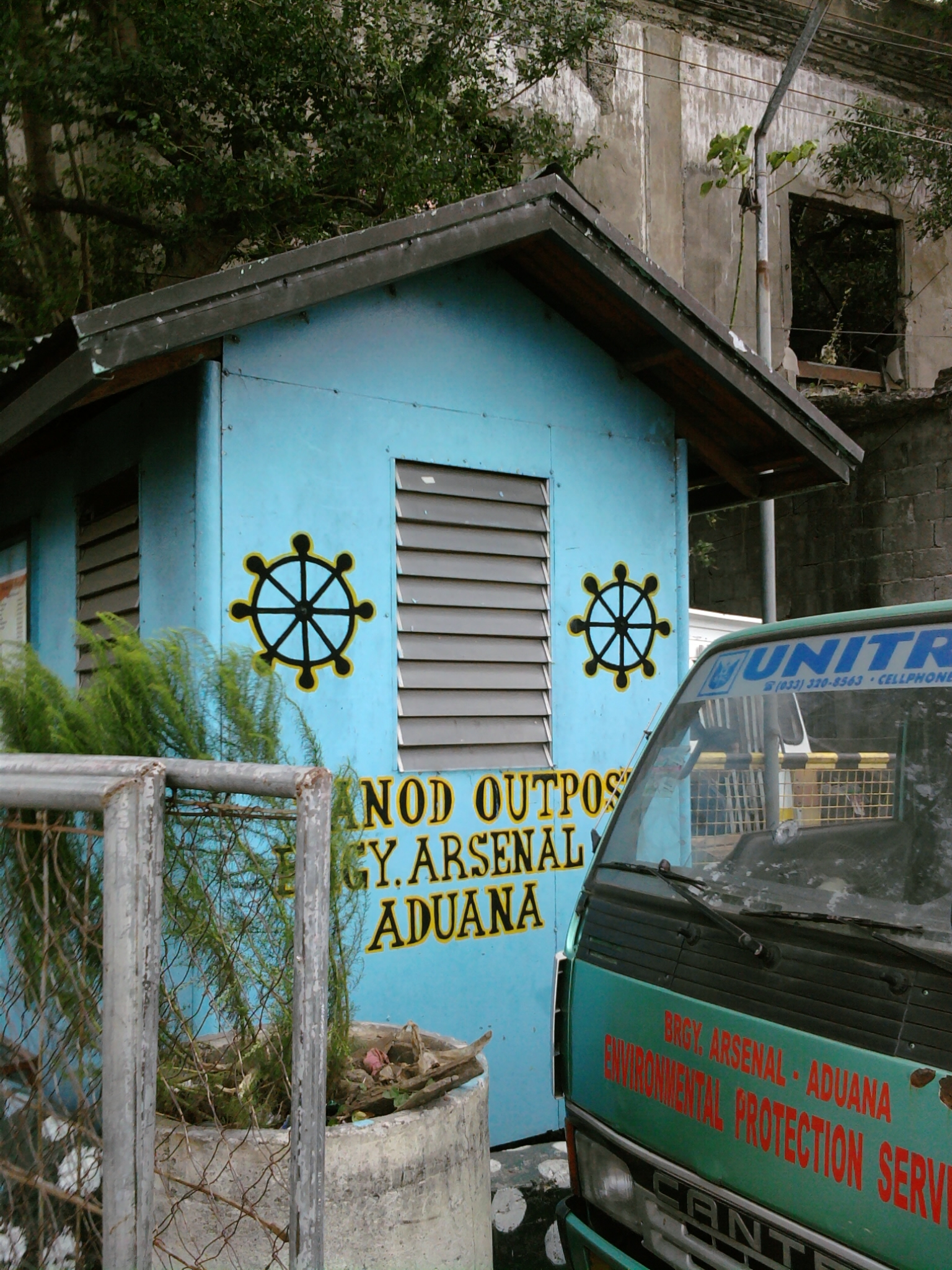
The Barangay Hall tanod outpost at Barangay Arsenal Aduana, City Proper, Iloilo City, Philippines

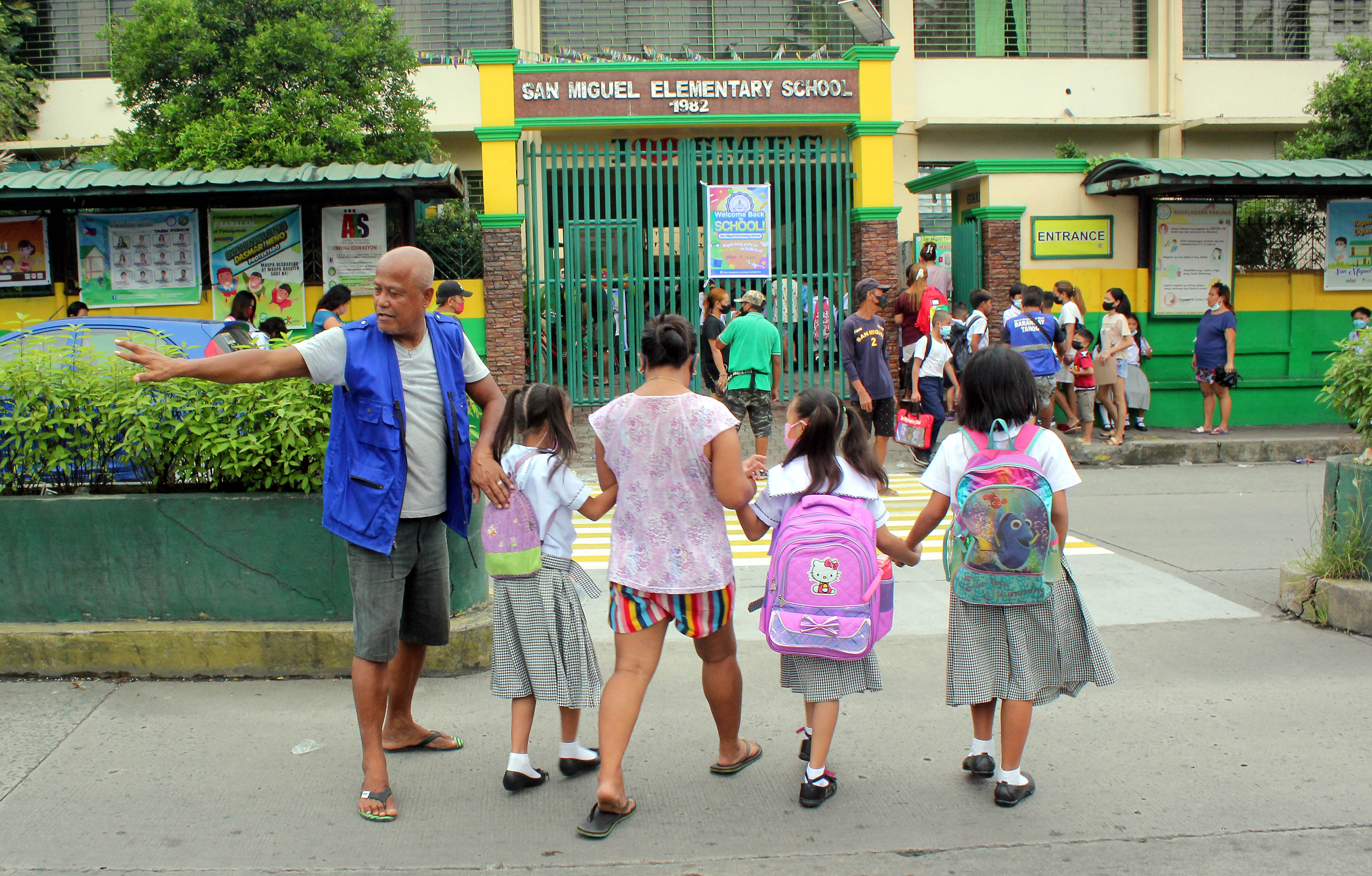
A tanod helping students cross the road at an elementary school in San Miguel II, Dasmariñas, Cavite

== See also ==
- Police officer
- Local government in the Philippines
- Philippine Flag
- DILG
