= 5-SPICE framework =

Discussions guidance

The 5-SPICE framework is an instrument designed for global health practitioners to guide discussions about community health worker (CHW) projects.

The 5-SPICE framework was developed by clinicians and researchers from Partners In Health, Harvard Medical School, and Brigham and Women's Hospital in Boston, MA. The framework lays out a model for integrating community health workers into public health systems, learning from the experiences of Partners In Health and partner organizations at their project sites in resource-poor settings around the world. 5-SPICE draws upon experiences from Haiti, Rwanda, Lesotho, Liberia, Nepal, Mali, and elsewhere, where CHWs have been employed to improve patient outcomes and overcome personnel shortages. The framework allows for all stakeholders in a community health program to participate in discussions and analyses to strengthen the impact of CHWs.

== Background ==
5-SPICE allows for all stakeholders in a community health program to participate in discussions and analyses to strengthen the impact of community health workers.

The name 5-SPICE is derived from Chinese cuisine emphasizing the balance between inputs and elements. The five main elements form an acronym:

- Supervision (especially management plans and structures)
- Partners (especially ownership and stewardship)
- Incentives (part of the larger theme of motivation)
- Choice (how CHWs are recruited to work and why they take the job)
- Education (what CHWs bring to their job and how they are trained)

These elements are not a static list, but a way to holistically analyze how core programmatic elements affect each other in the field. In the Freirean tradition of awareness, the 5-SPICE model emphasizes facilitated discussion and contemplation among stakeholders, particularly CHWs, to maximize program outputs. Ultimately, the 5-SPICE framework allows program implementers to study the relationship between the health system and the local community.

Other CHW program frameworks exist, such as the CHW Assessment and Improvement Matrix (AIM) developed by the USAID-funded Health Care Improvement (HCI) project. 5-SPICE complements these other frameworks by providing an acronym that condenses the many elements discussed in other frameworks into an easy-to-remember heuristic, allowing for more effective and efficient assessments that are exploratory rather than prescriptive.

== Scholarly Dissemination ==
The 5-SPICE framework was first formally introduced in an April 2013 publication in Global Health Action, in an article entitled "5-SPICE: the application of an original framework for community health worker program design, quality improvement and research agenda setting." The framework was subsequently presented at the 2013 Consortium of Universities for Global Health Conference, and the 2013 Swedish Society of Medicine's annual conference, Global Health—Beyond 2015. The article has also been accepted for presentation at the 2013 Annual Meeting of the American Public Health Association.
