= Promotora =

A promotora is a lay Hispanic/Latino community member who receives specialized training to provide basic health education in the community without being a professional health care worker. While most of their work entails educating target audiences about health issues affecting their community they also provide guidance in accessing community resources associated with health care. Often promotoras are residents and identified leaders in their community, who work for community-based health promotion projects or as part of a research group. Thus, promotoras serve as liaisons between their community, health professionals, human and social service organizations. As liaisons, they often play roles of an advocate, educator, mentor, outreach worker, role model, and interpreter.

Depending on the organizations with which they work, promotoras may volunteer their time, draw a salary or receive a stipend. Promotoras have predominantly been volunteers. if they assist only through delivery of educational material. However, since 2004, there has been a significant increase in the number of promotoras who are hired as staff and not only receive reimbursements for costs associated with their job (e.g., mileage reimbursement).

Traditionally, promotoras have been Latina women. However, more men are entering the field and the gender-neutral term "promotores" is increasingly being used to be more inclusive.

== History ==
The use of promotoras began in 1973 in Ciudad Juárez, Mexico, where Salud y Desarrollo Comunitario de Cd. Juárez, A.C. (Health and Community Development of Juárez City), ran by the Federación Mexicana de Asociaciones Privadas (Mexican Federation of Private Associations [FEMAP]), developed the first promotora model to help provide medical care and education to marginalized communities in Juárez. From there, the promotora model spread across Mexico to other Latin American countries and eventually to the United States.

While the promotora model was in use in Latin American countries since 1960, it did not gain attention in the United States until the mid-1960s to the 1970s. It was during those two decades that the United States federal government initiated a support campaign for the outreach to rural, marginalized, and hard-to-reach communities with the intention of improving access to care. Such model regained attention in the 1990s thanks to efforts from Centers for Disease Control and Health Resources and Services Administration.

The essence of using promotoras as means of health education dissemination to prevent disease has been used in countries in the continent of Africa for much longer than in the Americas. Third world countries with high mortality rates of preventable and infectious diseases adopted this model to outreach communities that had no access to decent health care. However, by definition, community health workers model used in other countries is somewhat different than the one of a promotora in the United States.

== Effect on Latino communities ==
Promotoras have gained significant importance in the way that care is delivered in the United States for Latinos in the last two decades. Latinos are the fastest growing ethnic group in the United States and one with some of the largest health disparities. Citizenship, language, and familiarity with the health care system are some of the most common barriers to access care for Latinos. As a result of these barriers, Latino immigrants to the United States, are two to three times more likely than the rest of the population to be uninsured. There is evidence that promotoras impact the health outcomes of Latinos via outreach and tracking. Since promotoras are often well-respected and community leaders, it is easier for them to communicate interventions with cultural sensitivity and experiential knowledge of community values, leading to faster rapport with program participants.

Although promotoras are not professional health workers, they are often tasked with projects of similar stature and importance because areas where they work are often significantly underserved (e.g., case management, referral source). In some cases, promotoras are able to achieve similar results to health professionals at much lower cost, often because they lack credentials.

Thus, the use of promotoras to bridge the gap between community needs and health resources is perceived by researchers as one of the most viable solutions to meeting community health needs.

Research suggests that the areas of highest health care needs for Latinos in the United States are:

- Chronic disease management (e.g., diabetes, asthma)
- Lifestyle behavioral change (e.g., smoking cessation, dieting, increased physical activity)
- Cancer prevention/screening
- HIV/AIDS and any other STI prevention
- Injury prevention (especially for farmworkers and those working in construction/ high-injury-risk employment)
- Environmental health (e.g., pesticide education, use of safety measures on the job)
- Mental health

== Impact on different health outcomes ==
A large body of research across ethnic groups suggests that early screenings and preventive education reduces poor health outcomes and health expenditures. Studies have shown small and large scale benefits in preventive care for Latinos when promotoras are used as an agent of change. Since the leading causes of death in Latinos are mostly related to cardiovascular disease, there have been several studies (including randomized clinical trials) that show benefits in the use of promotoras to prevent heart disease and facilitate treatment adherence. Promotoras have also shown to be promising results among farm workers with diabetes by aiding in the control of glycemic levels and increase social support. Similarly, there has been an effort to address the concern for home pesticide poisoning in the homes of farm working families. A pilot program using promotoras created a comic book to teach children about the risks of chronic pesticide exposure at the same time that they conducted family visits. This particular study showed an increase in knowledge but also one of behavior change to minimize pesticide exposures and poisonings.

== Training ==
While promotoras are not required to go through extensive and official training they are trained to become health educators on a specific issue. Many promotoras get trained by professional health workers on content areas but are encouraged to develop a plan tailored for their specific community under the supervision of the same or a different health professional. Thus, there are not many entities that “train” promotoras on how to become one but on content specific curriculum. Vision y Compromiso is one of the few entities in Southern California that offers content specific training to promotoras. MHP Salud (formerly Migrant Health Program) offers several levels of training for promotoras. It has been working with farmworkers and their rural communities since 1983 to improve health and increase access to care. Starting in Michigan, they have initiated programs in the Midwest, Colorado, and in Southern Texas along the United States Border with Mexico.
