= Schedule K =

Schedule K is a geographic coding scheme originally developed by the United States Maritime Administration and currently maintained by the United States Army Corps of Engineers to identify seaports handling waterborne shipments involved with foreign trade of the United States. The codes consist of five numeric digits and are primarily for electronic communications concerning U.S. Customs.

Code lists are maintained and published by the Waterborne Commerce Statistics Center division of the United States Army Corps of Engineers.

Each country's ports share a common three digit prefix which is unique per country (with the exception of Canada which has 21 prefixes grouped by geographic region). For example all ports in Denmark begin with 409, while the United Kingdom prefix is 412.

The system is organized such that the first digit roughly corresponds to a broad geographic region:

Caption: Schedule K, numeric prefix table
First Digit	Region	Example Code
0	Canada (Great Lakes Region)	01822 (Montreal, QC, Canada)
1	Canada (Pacific & Atlantic Regions), Greenland	12493 (Vancouver, BC, Canada)
2	Central America and Caribbean	23944 (Havana, Cuba)
3	South America	35177 (Sao Paulo, Brazil)
4	Europe	47507 (Naples, Italy)
5	Asia	50801 (Haifa, Israel)
6	Oceania	60267 (Sydney, Australia)
7	Africa	72901 (Alexandria, Egypt)
9	US Territories and Foreign Military Bases	93501 (Guam Island)
