= Programa Saúde da Família =

The Programa Saúde da Família (PSF), Family Health Program, in Portuguese language is one of the national public health programs in Brazil, which implements a national policy for primary care settings with the aim of substituting part of the traditional model of primary care based on medical specialists. As its name says, its main focus is on families instead of individuals, and it is organized around multidisciplinary Family Health Teams, formed by a core of professionals such as physicians, nurses, dentists, psychologists and social workers, as well as community health agents, a kind of "barefoot doctor".

Brazil has currently (August 2009) approximately 30,000 of these teams, deployed in 5,241 of its 5,656 municipalities. The population coverage by PSF is 96.1% (a total of more than 141 million inhabitants). A total of 5,339 municipalities have 230,000 community health agents.

PSF is now considered one of the main strategies of universal health care, service reorganization and reorientation of professional practice at this level of care, as well as a platform for health promotion, disease prevention and rehabilitation. Annual federal investments in the Program amount to ca. 2.5 billion US dollars.

== History ==
PSF as a concept originated in 1991, as a part of the reform of the health care sector demanded by the new Constitution of Brazil, with its intent of increasing the accessibility of health to all, and to enhance the actions of prevention and health promotion. In that year, PACS, a program for training and deploying of community health agents was started. After many theoretical discussions and preparations, the program was launched by the Ministry of Health in 1994, as part of the so-called Sistema Único de Saúde (SUS), or Unified Health Care System, the most ambitious initiative of the Brazilian federal government to establish a hierarchically organized and rationally funded program of public health, which is responsible for providing care to 75% of Brazil's current population of approximately 190 million inhabitants.

The Program expanded rapidly and, in 2006. recognizing its importance, the federal government issued the Decree No. 648 of March 28, 2006, where it was established that PSF was going to be a strategic priority of the Ministry of Health to organize primary care in the country, and the main tool to enable universal and continuing access to health services under the basic principles of SUS: universality, equity, decentralization, comprehensiveness, and community participation. The unique identification and central registry of all citizens of the country, using a so-called SUS Card, was to be one of its main organization supports. In its most recent development, a program for establishing in each region a Family Health Support Nucleus (NASF: Núcleo de Apoio à Saúde da Família) was started by the federal government in cooperation with state and municipal governments, In addition, a system of SUS Schools (training schools in several cities and states) was established, in order to provide the buildup and training of the huge specialized workforce required by SUS and PSF. The initial training of community health agents is part of its mission.

PSF has, so far, produced a positive impact on the direction of this new model of health care and prevention, but it still has not been able to completely substitute the former model, based in an overvaluation of the practices of curative care, medical specialists and hospitals, with its emphasis on an excess of technological procedures and drugs, leading to high costs. This traditional model has resulted in an undesired fragmentation of care. PSF strives to offer integrated health care focused on the family, instead of individuals, but the penetration of the model is still incomplete in most of the cities.

== Characteristics ==
According to this decree the following characteristics were defined for the Family Health Program:

1. Maintain a central registry of families and individuals and use consistently its data to analyze the health situation of the community, taking into account the social, economic, cultural, demographic and epidemiological characteristics of the territory;
2. Define the territory of operation, and carry out mapping and reconnoitering the delimited area, in order to understand that particular segment of the population, with continuous updating;
3. Perform the assessment, planning and implementation of health care activities based on the knowledge about health risks, thus being able to prioritize solutions to the more prevalent health problems of families;
4. Practice extended family care, effected through the knowledge of the structure and function of families, proposing interventions that will influence effectively the processes of health and illness of individuals, families and the community;
5. Promote interdisciplinary teamwork, integrating technical and professional areas of different backgrounds;
6. Promote and develop partnerships with community agents and integrate with social projects, with the aim of promoting health in accordance with priorities and under the coordination of municipal management;
7. Assess different knowledge and practices from the perspective of a holistic and problem solving approach, enabling the creation of bonds of trust with ethics, commitment and respect;
8. Promote and encourage community participation in the social control, planning, implementation and evaluation of actions, and
9. Perform systematic monitoring and evaluation of actions implemented, in order to readjust and improve the whole process.

Based on this same ordinance, the composition of family health teams was established, and its scope of action was defined as restricted to a maximum of 4,000 inhabitants (approximately 1,000 families). The core team consisted minimally of a physician, a nurse, several nursing assistants (or practical nurses) and several community health agents. The team has 30 working hours per week for all members. Several Brazilian cities hire other professionals such as dentists, pharmacists, nutritionists, physical educators, psychologists, physiotherapists, speech therapists, occupational therapists, etc.

== See also ==
- Family medicine
- Community health agent
- Universal health care
- Primary Health Centre
