= Barangay health worker =

Community health worker in the Philippines

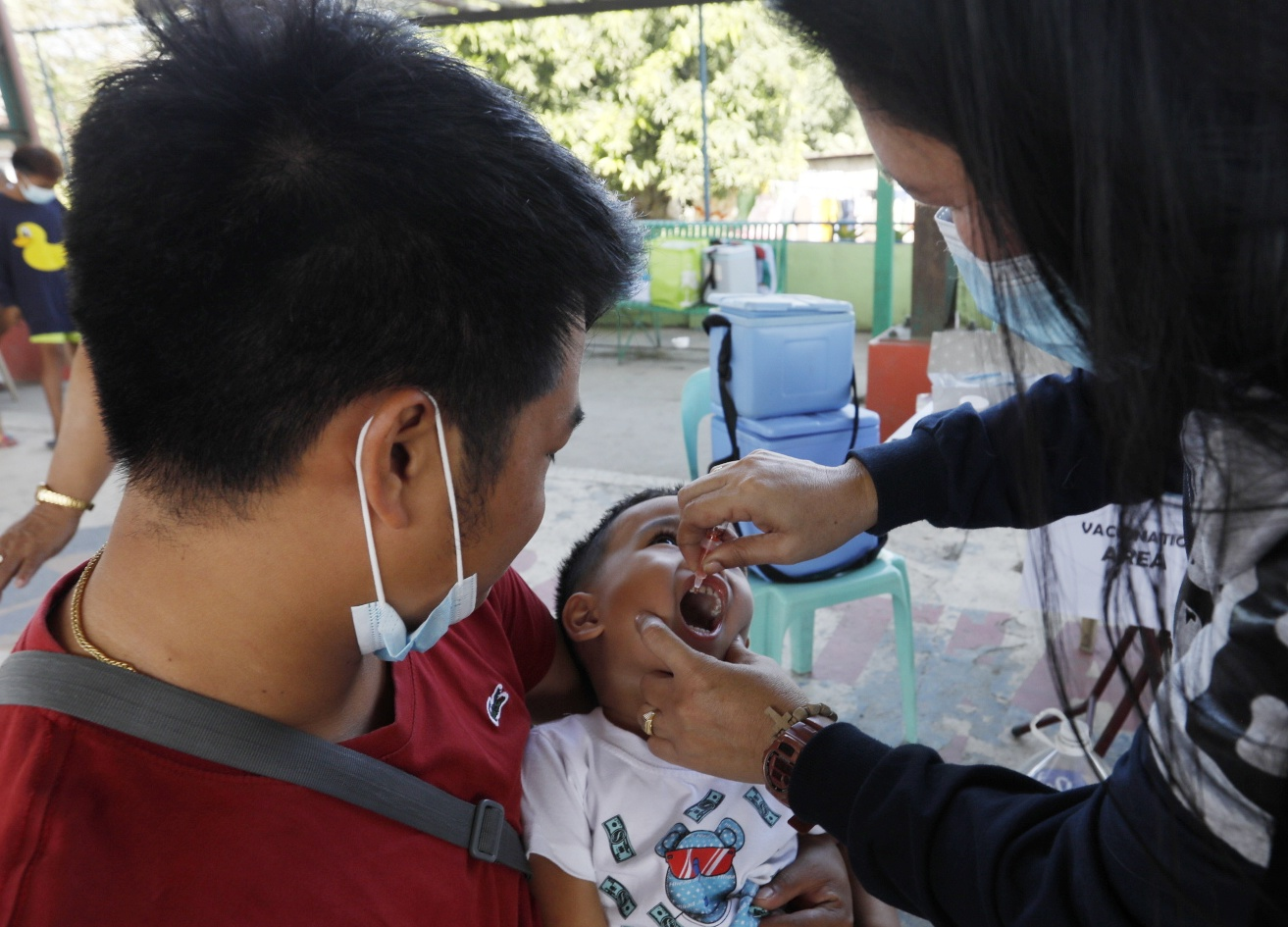
Barangay health workers immunizing children against rubella, polio, and measles in Cavite

A barangay health worker (BHW), or a barangay health volunteer, is a health care provider in the Philippines. BHWs undergo a basic training program under an accredited government or non-government organization and render primary care services in the community. They provide services such as first aid, maternal, neonatal, and child health care, as well as community-based interventions, including immunization clinics in barangays.

== History ==
With the decentralization of healthcare through the Local Government Code of 1991, the responsibility for delivering primary health services was transferred from the central government to locally elected provincial, city, and municipal governments. Health services were previously funded and managed by the Department of Health (DOH), but responsibility for their delivery was transferred to local governments following the devolution of the healthcare system.

== Training and practice ==
Barangay health workers are accredited to function as such by the local health board in accordance with the guidelines promulgated by the DOH, as provided in Section 3 of Republic Act No. 7883. This act, also known as the "Barangay Health Workers' Benefits and Incentives Act of 1995", recognizes the need for primary health care and organizes health workers to promote health empowerment.

Barangay health workers are a type of community health worker and act as health advocates and educators within their communities. They live in the communities they serve and receive about five weeks of training, covering areas such as administering immunizations, weighing children, and birthing services. They provide information, education, and motivation services for primary health care, maternal and child health, child rights, family planning, and nutrition.

On average, each volunteer is expected to work with around 20 families in their community. However, the scarcity of trained individuals has reduced the number of volunteers, especially in some remote areas, where one or two volunteers now serve an entire barangay.

=== National certification ===
Barangay Health Services NC II is a qualification developed by the Technical Education and Skills Development Authority (TESDA) with different stakeholders to empower barangay health workers.

== Research ==
Research by Fe Espino at the Research Institute for Tropical Medicine (RITM) on dengue prevention in the Philippines highlights the importance of community trust in BHWs to the success of behavior change programs. In 2010, the number of dengue cases in the Philippines had risen from 37,101 in 2006 to 118,868. Dengue fever is caused by a virus transmitted by mosquitoes, which breed in stagnant water. Due to water shortages, households are forced to store water throughout the year. Espino's research team engaged local BHWs to introduce a household water container management system to control dengue in two communities in "Masagana City" in Metro Manila.

In both Village A and Village B, BHWs were trained to teach households to inspect water containers for immature mosquitoes. An instructional guide and a container management checklist were provided, with the checklist collected during monthly visits. The team also provided a video demonstrating dengue control techniques. Village A, however, encountered many problems, and there was a poor response to the program. In Village B, participants reported that the visits not only made residents more aware of dengue control but also made them more inclined to take action. Although behavior change results had not yet been reported, the apparent difference was that the BHWs in Village B were more active and more trusted by the community. The study suggested that when engaging change agents, it is important to understand both how the community views them and how they view their community.

== Limitations ==
Despite the efforts of BHWs, they are constrained by the political leadership of local government units. There is a perception that barangay health stations provide low-quality health services and have low client satisfaction. With funding limitations, barangay health stations struggle with shortages of medicines, long wait times, declining quality of facility infrastructure, and a lack of proper training and staffing. The rural poor are the most susceptible to poor sanitation, malnutrition, and inadequate hygiene practices. These communities, which depend heavily on barangay health services, are affected by political, social, and economic decisions made by local authorities.

Volunteers may have limited knowledge due to advances in medicine and a lack of proper training. Training is crucial for barangay health workers to improve their health knowledge and competency and provide quality care.

== See also ==
- Barangay Health Wellness Partylist
- Community health workers
- Health in the Philippines
- The World Is Flat (book on globalization)
