= Community health agent =

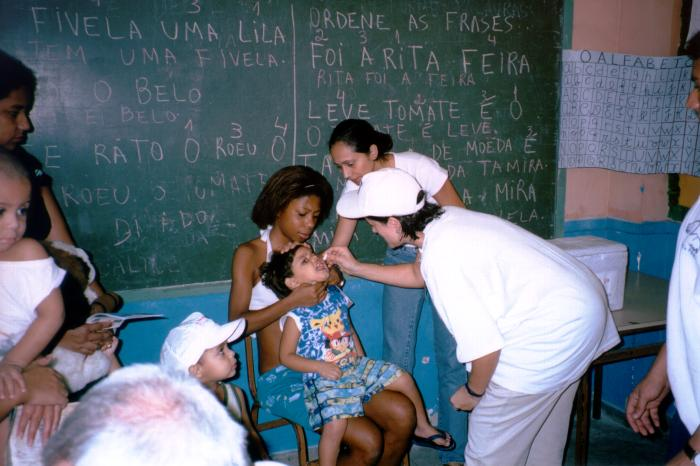
A public health team vaccinating children for polio at Rocinha, a favela in Rio de Janeiro, 2001 (Source: CDC)

Community health agent (agente comunitário de saúde or ACS, in Portuguese language) is the title of a specific lay health care worker developed in Brazil by way of PACS (Program of Community Health Workers) in 1991 as part of the construction of the Brazilian Unified Health System established by Constitutional rule in 1988.

The agent, which was said to be inspired on the barefoot doctors program in China, is not certified to practice medicine or nursing, but has the primary task of gathering information on the health status of a small community by means of a close relationship with it. Originally, the agent was to be one of the inhabitants of a street, neighborhood, or surrounding region, and was to be chosen based on a solid connection with his neighbors, as well as the capacity to dedicate eight hours a day to the task. Every agent is supervised by a doctor or nurse of the health clinic, and home visits are conducted in the coverage area of a basic health unit, thus producing information that can assess the main health problems of his community.

With the proposition of the Brazilian Ministry of Health in 1994, when it created the a nationwide family health program, called PSF—Programa de Saúde da Família—health community workers can be found in two different situations in relation to the health care system:

- Linked to a basic health unit not yet attached to the Family Health Program;
- Connected to a basic family health as a member of the multidisciplinary team.

As of October 2009, there are more than 260,000 community health agents present both in rural and peri-urban areas of small municipalities as well as in highly urbanized and industrialized cities.

== Duties ==
- Encourage community organization continually;
- Participate in the life of the community primarily through the organizations, encouraging the discussion of issues relating to the improvement of life;
- Strengthen links between the community and health services;
- Inform other team members on the availability of health needs and social dynamics of the community;
- Lead the community for appropriate use of health services;
- Register births, notifiable diseases and epidemiological surveillance and deaths;
- Register all the families of their service area;
- Identify and register all pregnant women and children from 0 to 6 years of their service area, through home care;
- Integrate governmental and non-governmental organizations, groups of community associations (midwives, mother's club, etc.).
- Carry out, within his/her level of competence, actions and basic health activities:
  - Monitoring of pregnant women and nursing mothers.
  - Promotion of breastfeeding.
  - Monitoring growth and development of children.
  - Ensuring compliance with the schedule of vaccination and other vaccinations that may be necessary.
  - Control of diarrheal diseases.
  - Control of acute respiratory infection (ARI).
  - Guidance on alternative foods.
  - Use of folk medicine.
  - Promoting sanitation and improving the environment.
