= Barangay hall =

Community and governance center in the Philippines

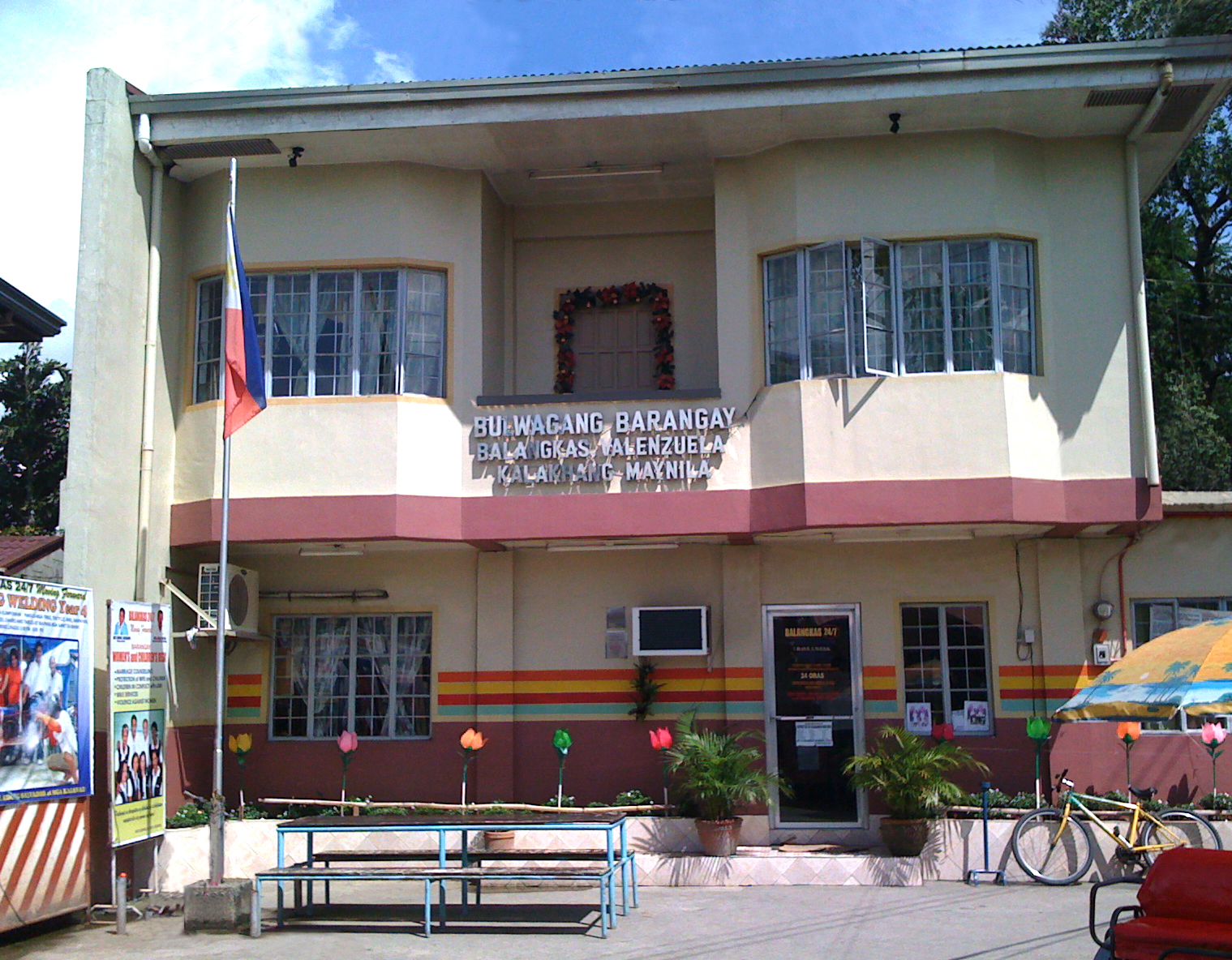
Barangay hall in Balangkas, Valenzuela City

A barangay hall is the seat of government for a barangay, the lowest elected administrative division of the Philippines, below that of a city or municipality. It serves as the office of the barangay captain and meeting place for the Sangguniang Barangay. These officers' names, pictures and responsibilities are usually displayed in the hall. The hall can be considered the counterpart to its municipality's municipal hall.

The barangay hall also serves as a local community center, often providing space for both permanent and temporary services and events. The barangay's day care center and office space for the tanods and the barangay health workers are often located there. Medical missions, religious services, fiestas, and sports contests are often held near or next to the barangay hall.

== Gallery ==
A selection of barangay halls:

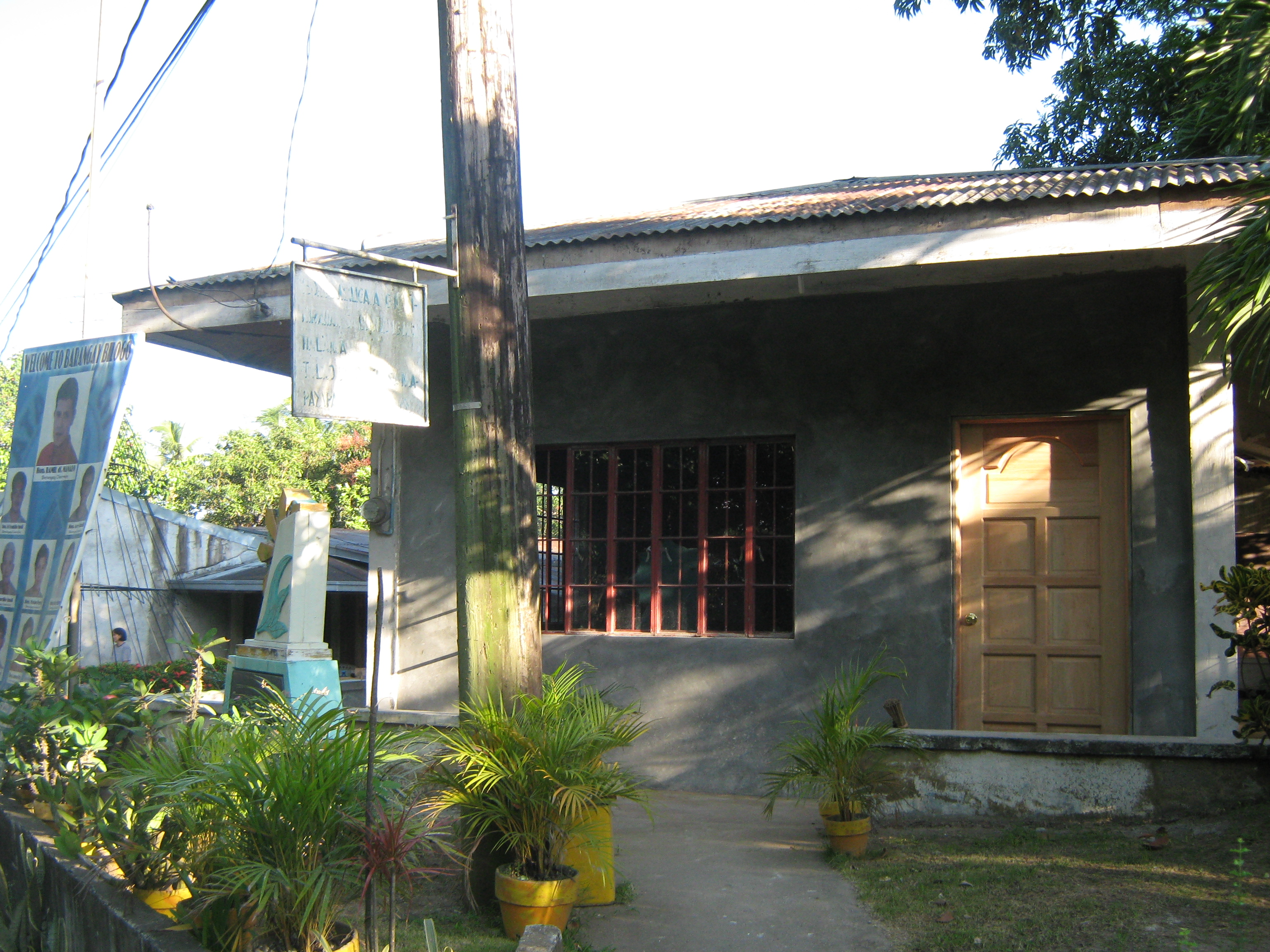
The Barangay Bilogo Multi-purpose Hall, Batangas City

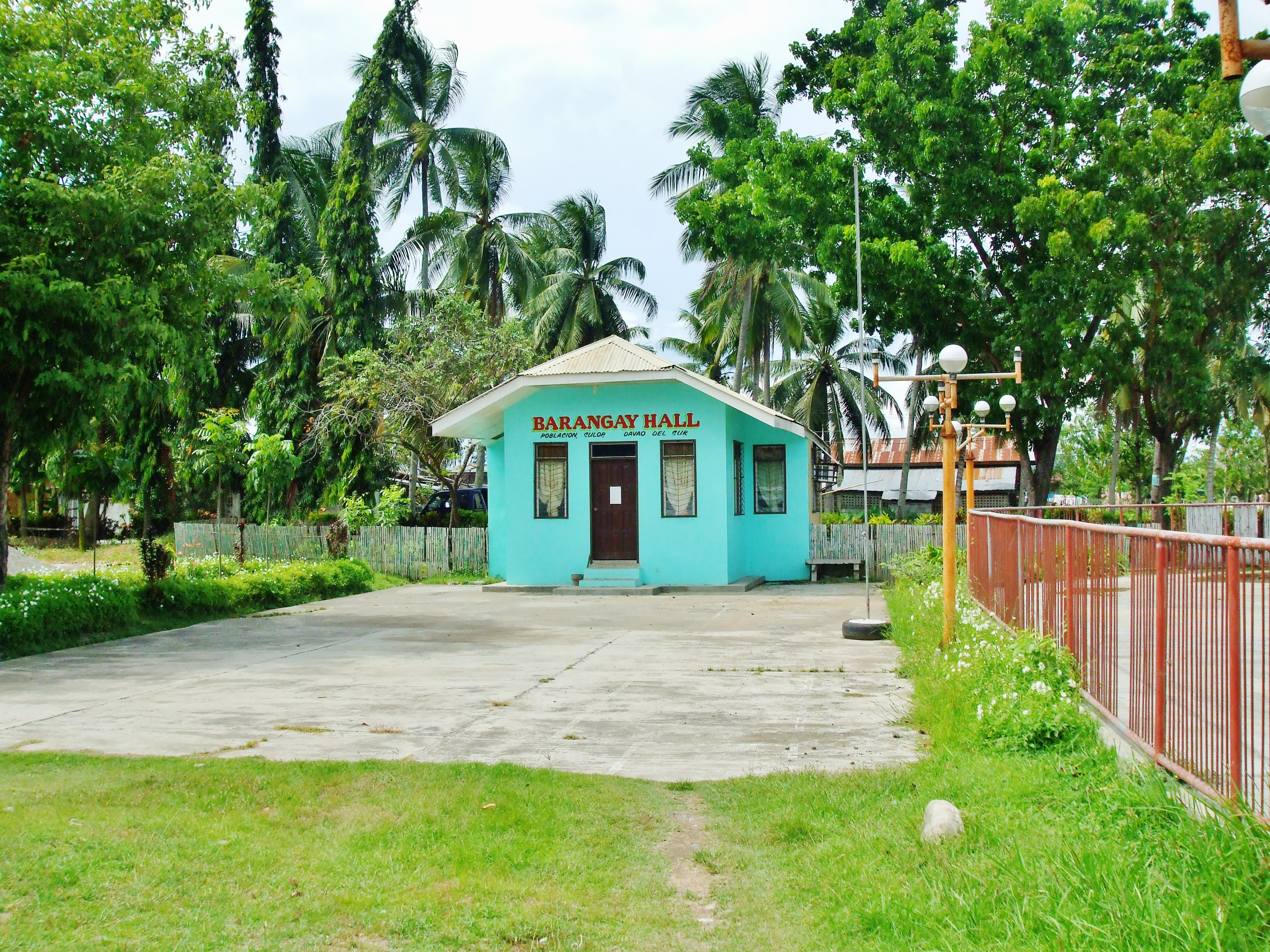
Sulop Barangay Hall

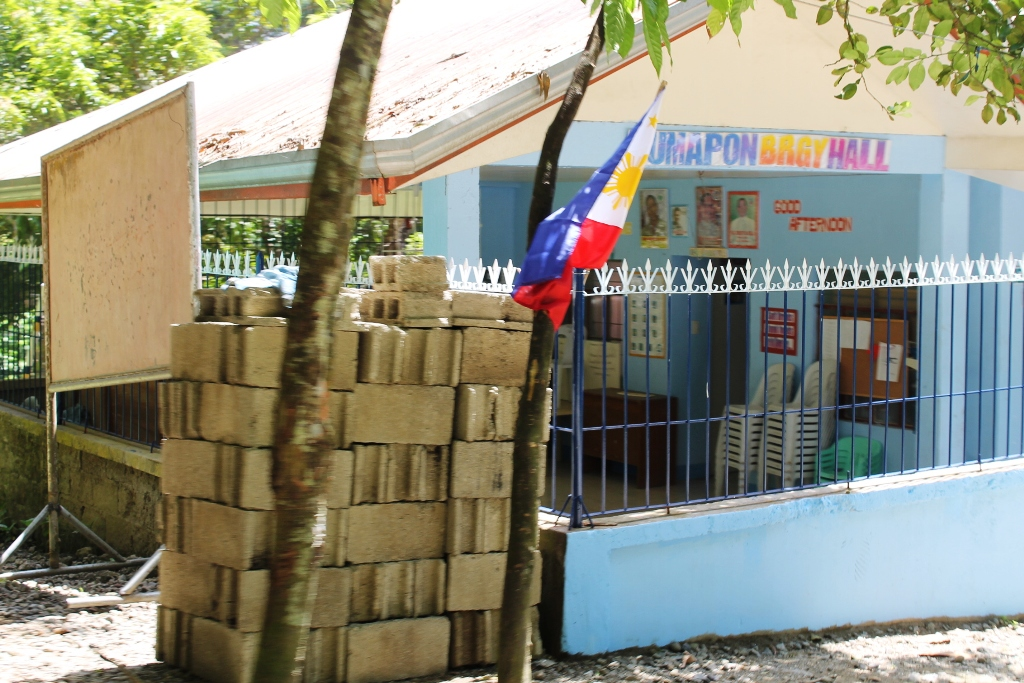
Tumapon Barangay Hall

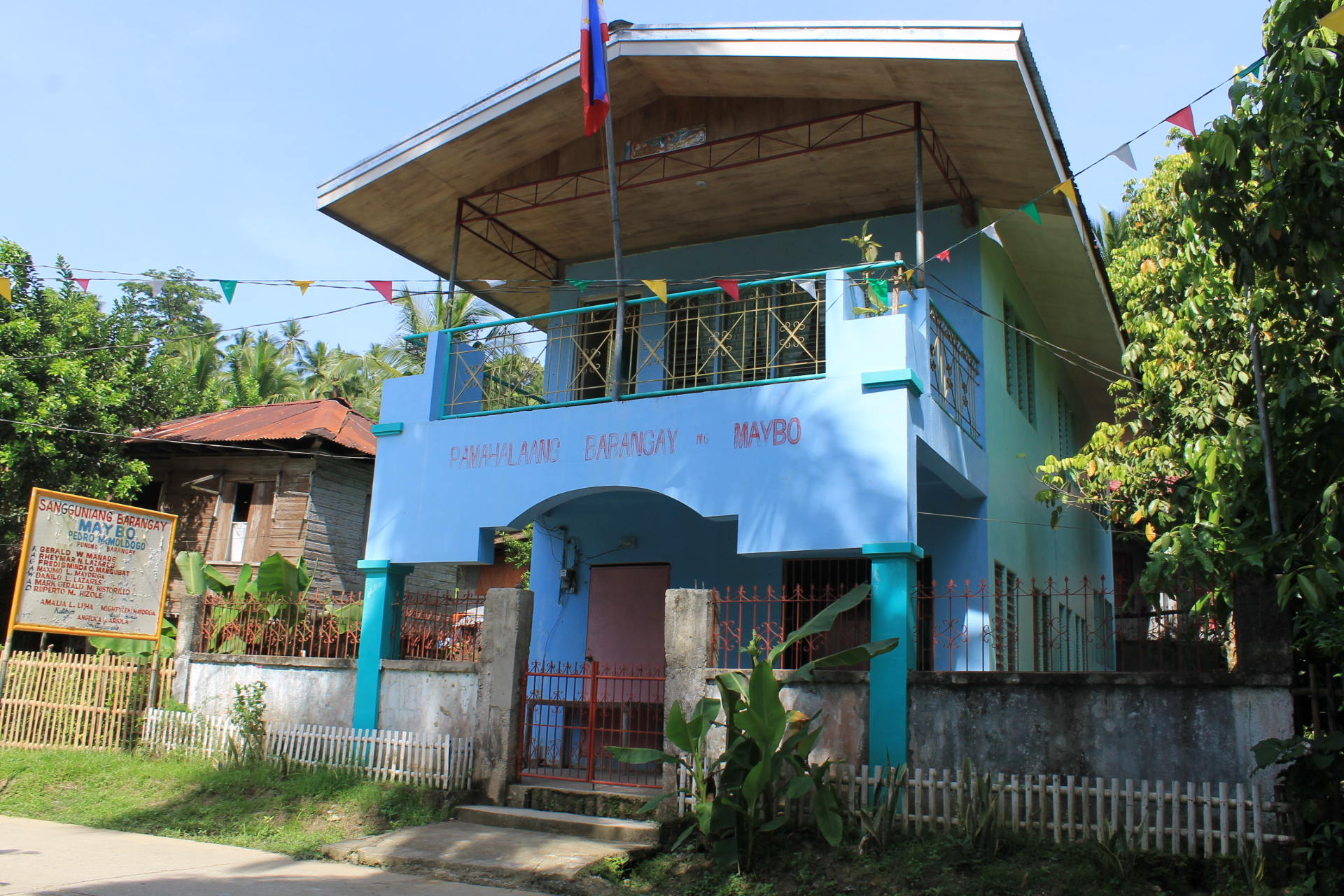
Maybo Barangay Hall in Boac, Marinduque

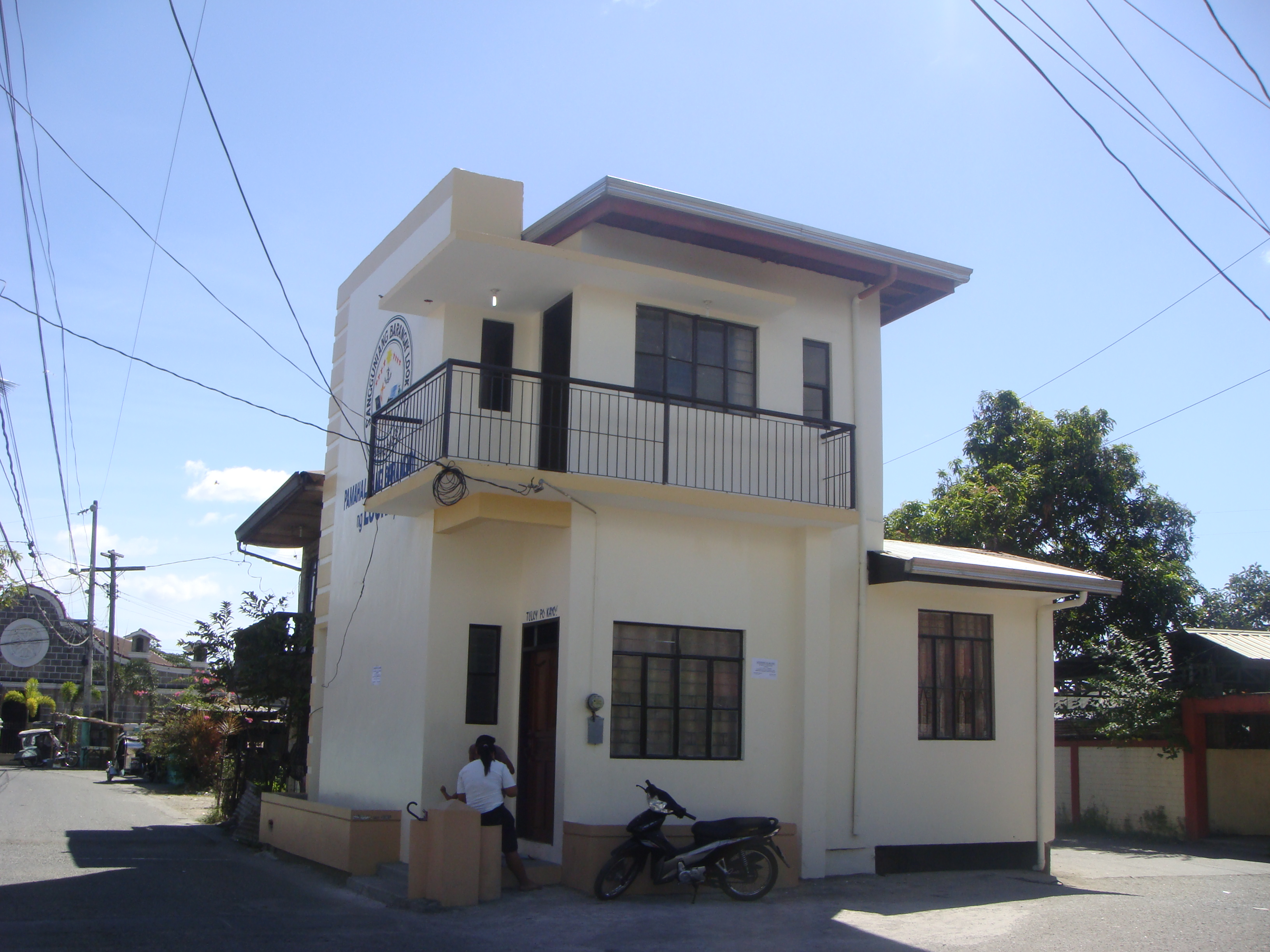
Barangay Hall, Barangay Look 1st, Malolos City Bulacan.

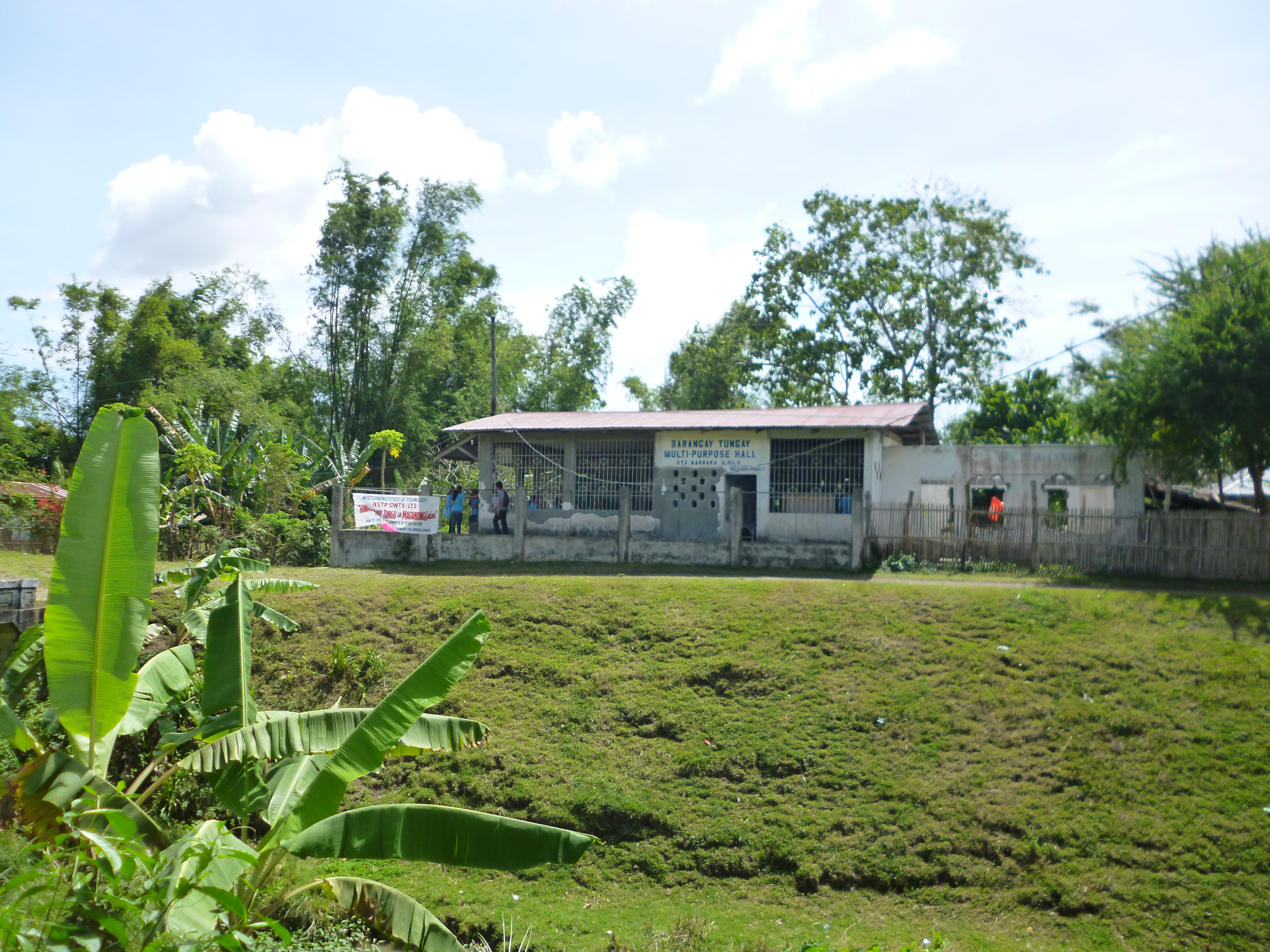
The Multipurpose Hall of Barangay Tungay, Santa Barbara, Iloilo

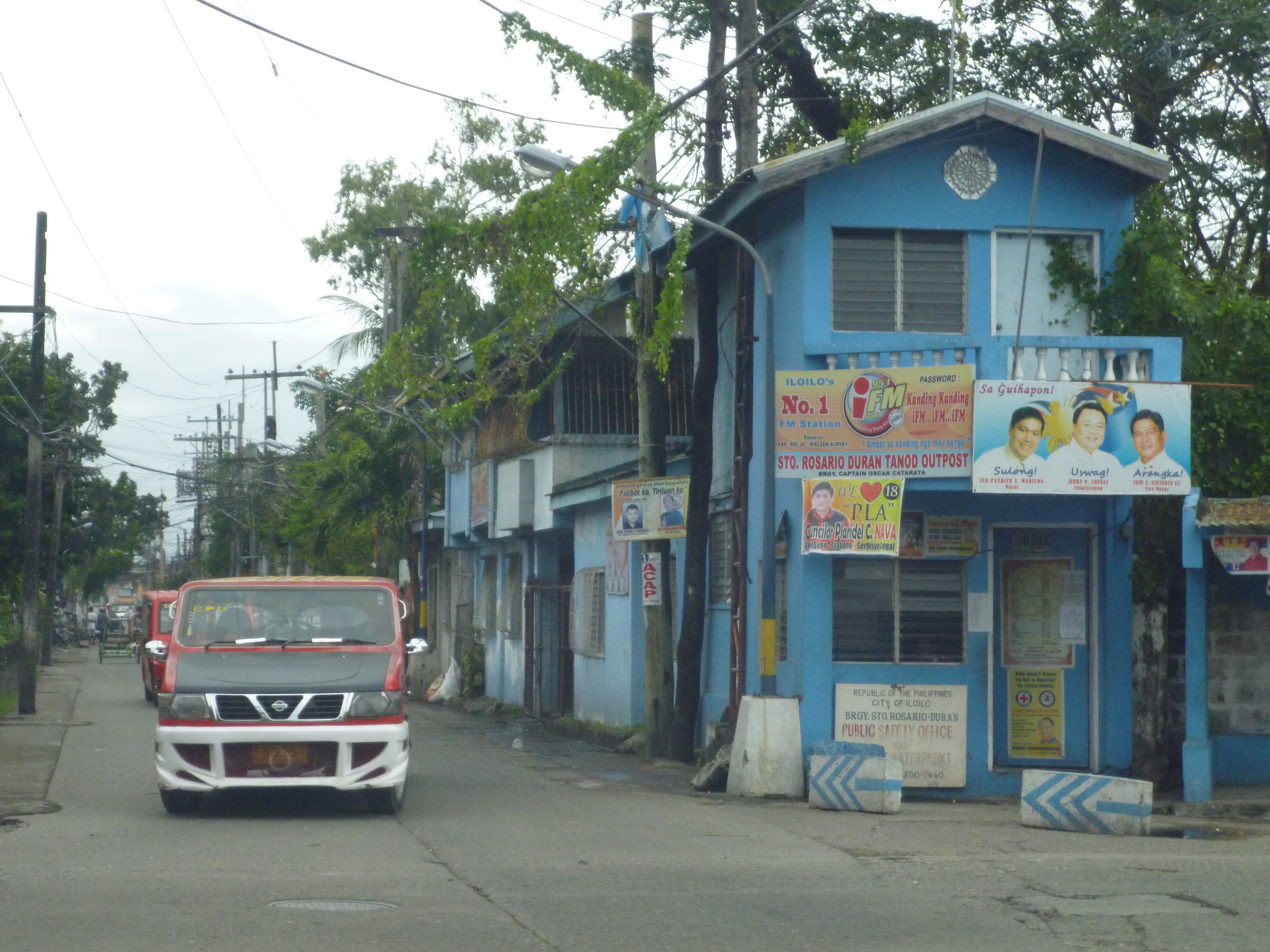
Barangay Hall and Tanod Outpost, Barangay Sto Rosario, City Proper, Iloilo City

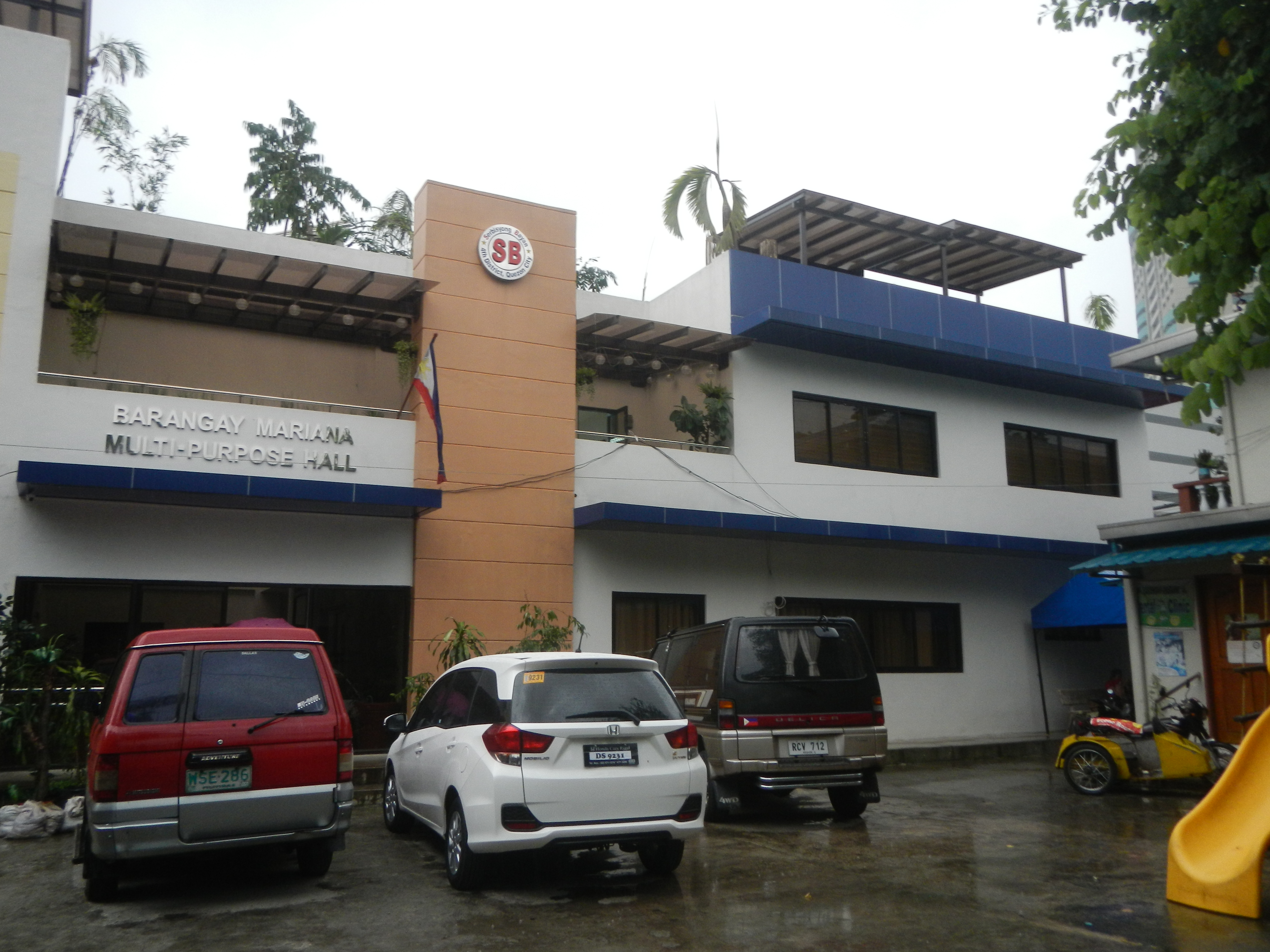
Barangay hall and multi-purpose hall of Barangay Mariana, Quezon City

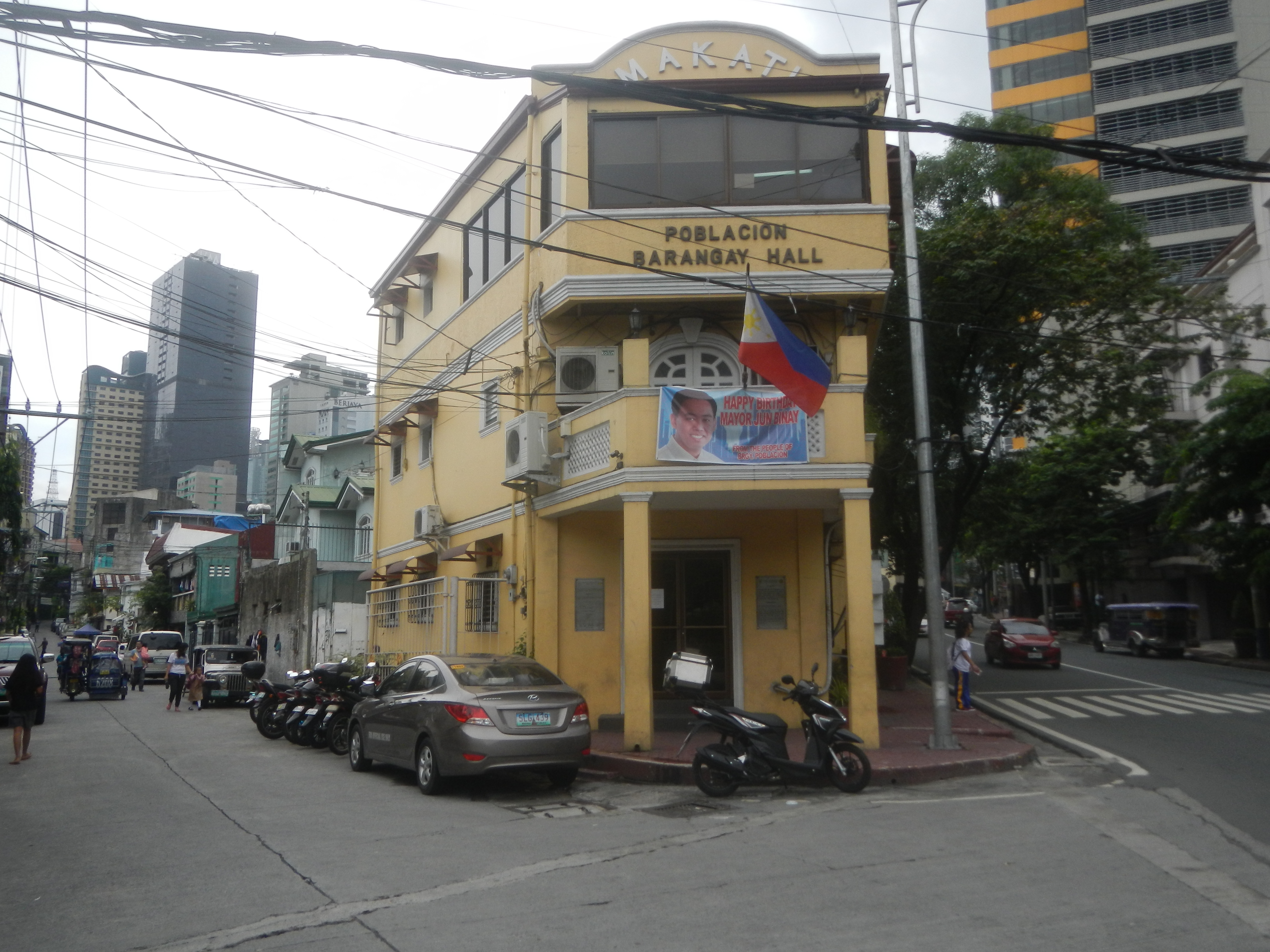
Barangay hall of Barangay Poblacion, Makati

== See also ==
- Dap-ay
