= Youth in Pakistan =

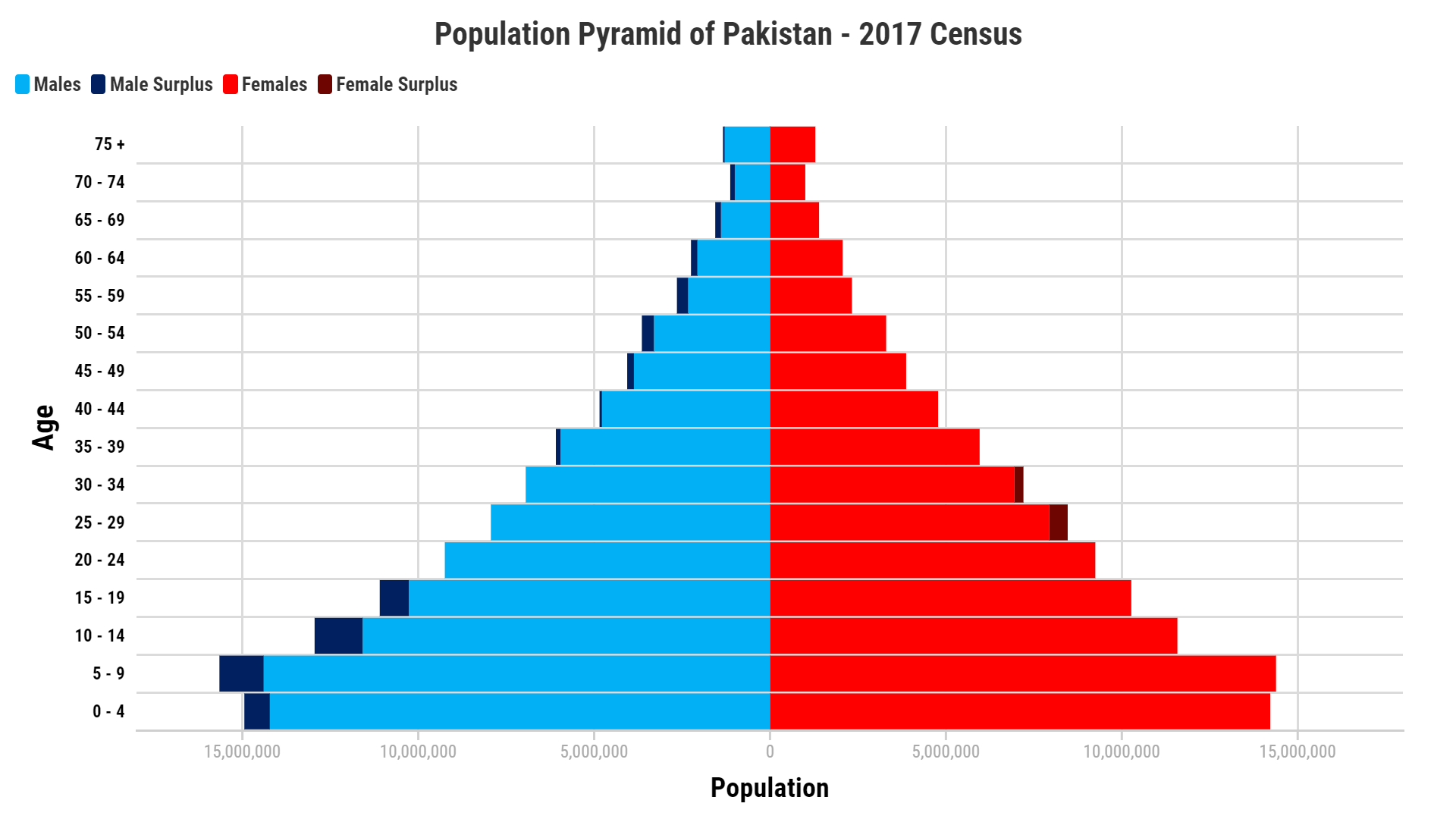
Population Pyramid of Pakistan as per the 2017 Pakistan Census

Pakistan's estimated population (excluding the disputed areas of Azad Kashmir and Gilgit-Baltistan) was 207,774,520 according to the provisional results of the 2017 Census of Pakistan. Pakistan is the world's fifth-most-populous country.

Majority of the population are part of the youth age bracket: in 2019, 34.8% were thought to be 14 or younger, though in 1990 this had been much higher at 43.7%. In 2010, the figure for those aged 24 or less was 62.19%.

Many young Pakistanis are affected by serious issues around education in Pakistan; only 68% of Pakistani children finish primary school education and Pakistan has one of the lowest literacy rates in the world. Other areas with significant issues include: child marriage in Pakistan, child labour in Pakistan, street children, malnutrition, and health problems.

== Education ==
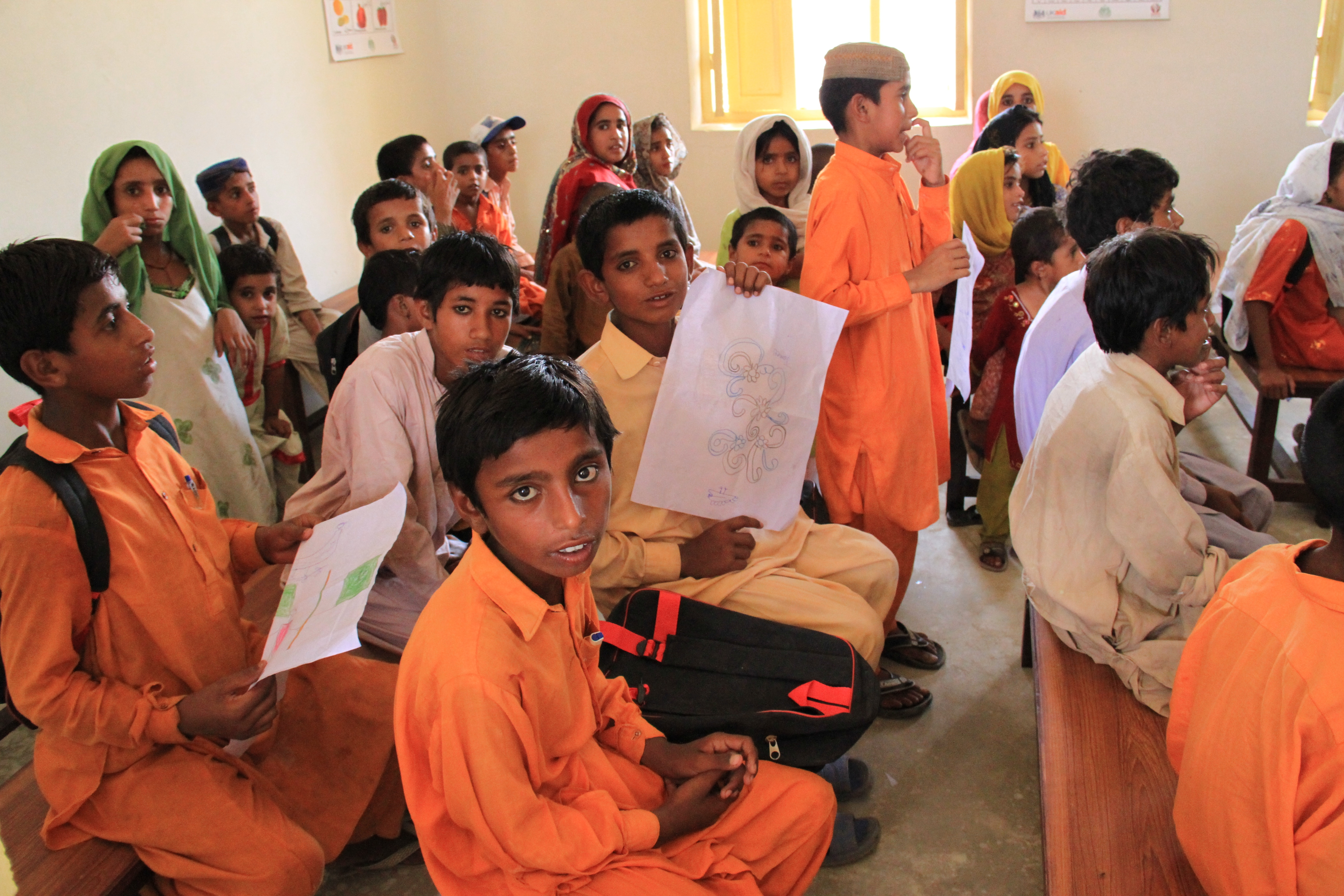
A primary school in a village in the Sindh region

Article 25-A of the Constitution of Pakistan obligates the state to provide free and compulsory quality education to children of the age group of 5 to 16 years. "The State shall provide free and compulsory education to all children of the age of five to sixteen years in such a manner as may be determined by law".

Pakistan has one of the lowest literacy rates in the world and the second largest out of school population (22.8 million children) after Nigeria. Only 68% of Pakistani children finish primary school education.

=== Skill Development and Migration Trends ===
In 2025, Prime Minister Shehbaz Sharif approved Pakistan’s first Skills Impact Bond, a "Pay-for-Success" model aimed at attracting private investment to enhance youth employability. The initiative focuses on equipping young people with market-driven skills and ensuring job placements, including opportunities abroad. The government also emphasized language training to facilitate overseas employment, reflecting a growing trend of Pakistani youth seeking careers outside the country due to limited domestic prospects.

Amid this push for skilled migration, concerns persist over the rising use of illicit drugs among the youth, linked to unemployment, lack of social support, and economic instability. The dual challenge of brain drain and substance abuse remains a critical issue for policymakers.

=== Child marriage ===
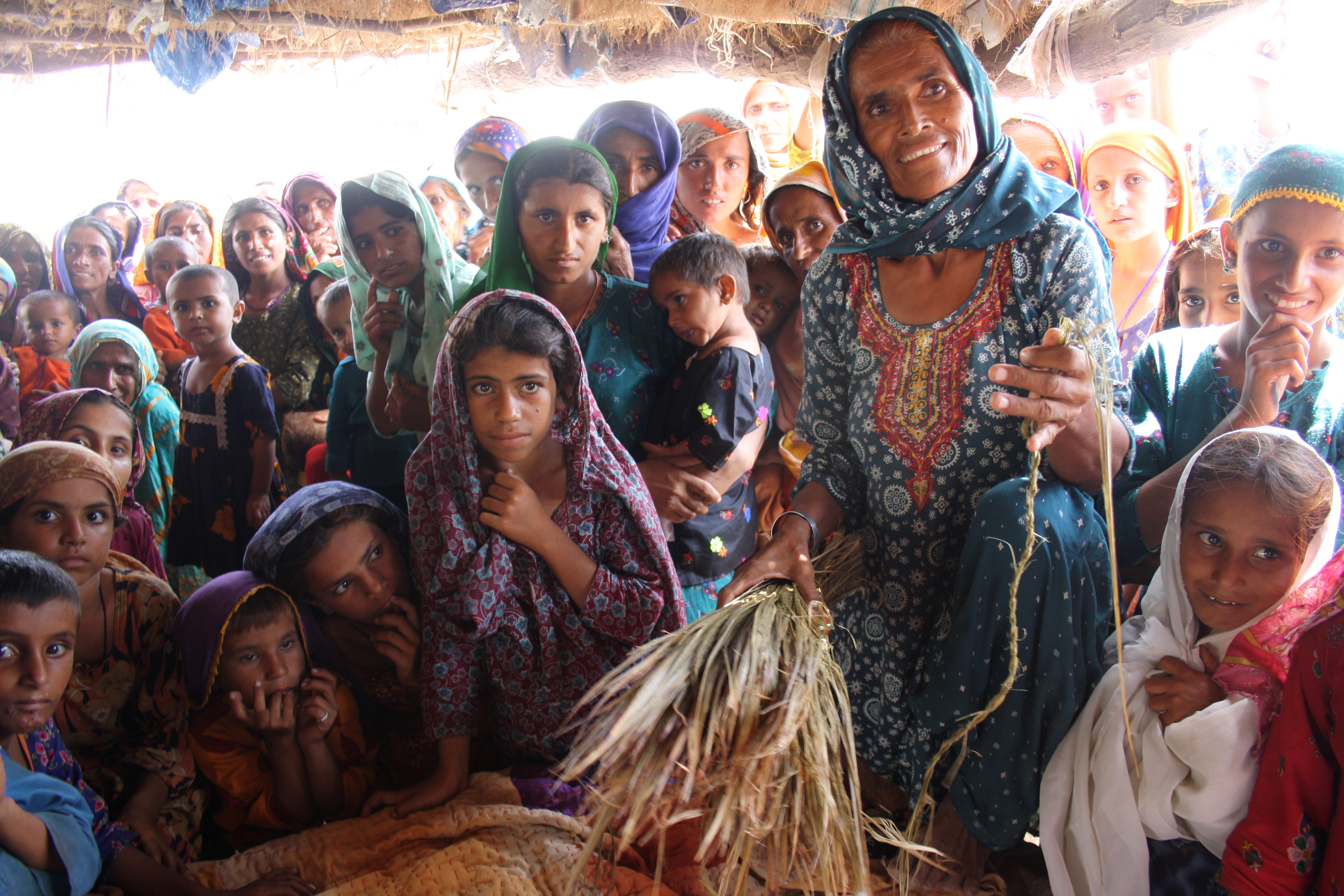
Women and girls in Qamber, Shadadkot, north-west Sindh, Pakistan

The practice of child marriage is prevalent in Pakistan, with the highest prevalence in the Sindh province. It disproportionately affects the daughter of a Pakistani family. Defined as marriage before the age of 18 years, child marriage is widespread in Pakistan and linked to spousal violence. Child marriage occurs most often in rural and low-income households where education is minimal. The Pakistan Demographic and Health Survey conducted from 2012 to 2013 reported that 47.5% of currently married women aged 15 to 24 had been married before the age of 18. Moreover, of those child marriages, one-third of those women reported spousal violence. Another UNICEF report claims 70% of girls in Pakistan are married before the age of 16. As with India and Africa, the UNICEF data for Pakistan is from a small sample survey in the 1990s.

The exact number of child marriages in Pakistan below the age of 13 is unknown, but rising according to the United Nations.

Another custom in Pakistan, called swara or vani, involves village elders solving family disputes or settling unpaid debts by marrying off girls. The average marriage age of swara girls is between 5 and 9. Similarly, the custom of watta satta has been cited as a cause of child marriages in Pakistan.

According to Population Council, 35% of all females in Pakistan become mothers before they reach the age of 18, and 67% have experienced pregnancy – 69% of these have given birth – before they reach the age of 19. Less than 4% of married girls below the age of 19 had some say in choosing her spouse; over 80% were married to a near or distant relative. Child marriage and early motherhood are common in Pakistan.

== Street children ==
Pakistan's major cities and urban centers are home to an estimated 1.2 million street children. This includes beggars and scavengers who are often very young. The law and order problem worsens their condition as boys and girls are fair game to others who would force them into stealing, scavenging, and smuggling to survive. A large proportion consumes readily available solvents to stave off hunger, loneliness, and fear. Children are vulnerable to contracting STDs such as HIV/AIDS, as well as other diseases. The number of street children in Pakistan is estimated to be between 1.2 million and 1.5 million. Issues like domestic violence, unemployment, natural disasters, poverty, unequal industrialization, unplanned rapid urbanization, family disintegration, and lack of education are considered the major factors behind the increase in the number of street children. Society for the Protection of the Rights of the Child (SPARC) carried out a study which presented 56.5% of the children interviewed in Multan, 82.2% in Karachi, 80.5% in Hyderabad, and 83.3% in Sukkur were forced to move on to the streets after the 2010 and 2011 floods.

== Child labour ==
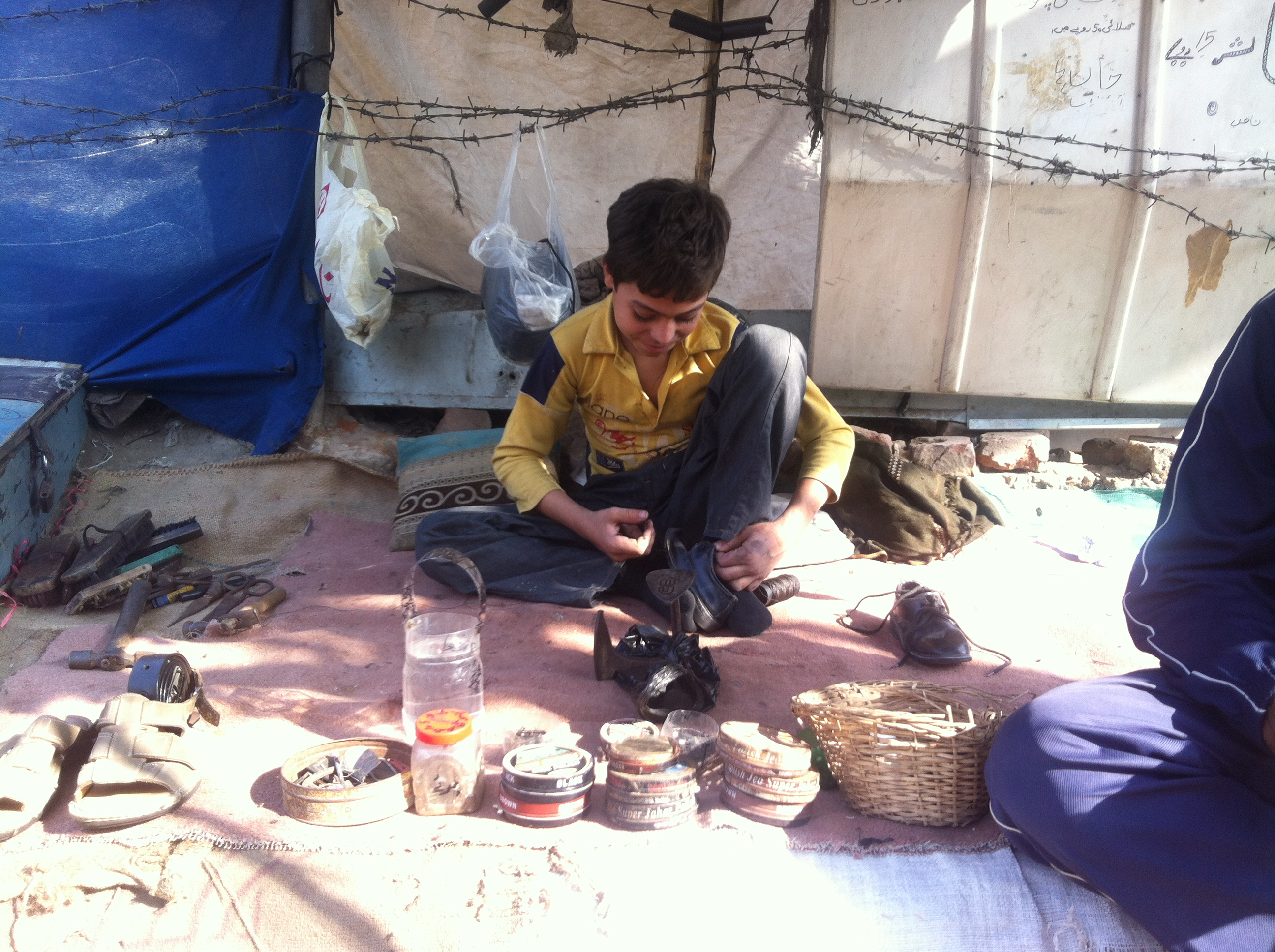
A Pakistani boy working as a cobbler

Child labour in Pakistan is the employment of children for work in Pakistan, which causes them mental, physical, moral, and social harm. The Human Rights Commission of Pakistan estimated that in the 1990s, 11 million children were working in the country, half of whom were under age ten. In 1996, the median age for a child entering the work force was seven, down from eight in 1994. It was estimated that one quarter of the country's work force was made up of children.

== Domestic violence ==
Domestic violence leads to increased risk towards certain health outcomes like major depression, dysthymia, conduct disorder, and drug abuse. Moreover, because women are primary caretakers in Pakistan, children also face increased risk for depression and behavioural problems.

== Health ==
=== Malnutrition ===
Malnutrition is one of the most significant public health problems in Pakistan, and especially among children. According to UNICEF, about half of children are chronically malnourished. National surveys show that for almost three decades, the rates of stunting and acute undernutrition in children under five years of age have remained stagnant, at 45% and 16%, respectively. Additionally, at the “national level almost 40% of these children are underweight...and about 9% [are affected] by wasting”, diseases where muscle and fat tissues degenerate as a result of malnutrition. Similarly, women are also at risk, with about half suffering from anemia, which is commonly caused by iron deficiency.

=== Mental health ===
Depression often starts at a young age and affects women more commonly than men. One or two mothers out of 10 have depression after childbirth. Depression also limits a mother's capacity to care for her child, and can seriously affect the child's growth and development. A study showed that exposure to maternal mental distress is associated with malnutrition in 9‐month infants in urban Pakistan.

=== Polio ===
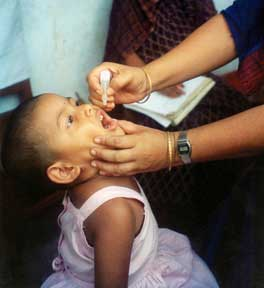
A child receives the oral polio vaccine (USAID).

Pakistan is one of the two remaining countries in the world where poliomyelitis (polio) is still categorized as an endemic viral infection, the other country being Afghanistan. As of 20 July 2020, there have been 60 documented cases in Pakistan in 2020, and 146 documented cases in Pakistan in 2019. The total count of wild poliovirus cases in Pakistan in 2018 was 12. By 1991, only 83% of Pakistani children had been vaccinated. Research by the Center for Disease Control (CDC) in April 1998 cited a failure to vaccinate, vaccine failure, and inadequate immunization strategies as causes for the continued incidents of polio in this time. Reasons for under-vaccination included the population being uninformed, considering vaccination unimportant, and having to travel long distances to vaccination sites.

In March 2001, about 27 million children were vaccinated across the country in the hope that Pakistan could be virus-free by the end of that year. As of 2004, when there were 30 million children in Pakistan under five, about 200,000 health workers were required for a vaccination campaign that was carried out eight times a year. A documentary, Polio True Stories, was aired on several television channels to make people aware of the problems facing people affected by the disease. In August 2015, the country launched an injectable polio vaccine intended to treat four million children and bring Pakistan closer to its goal of eradication by 2016. While the new vaccine is pricier than the traditional oral polio vaccine (OPV) and requires that a doctor or nurse administer it, the injection needs only one dose, not repeated doses, to generate immunity.

It has been shown that low parental - specifically, maternal - literacy and knowledge regarding vaccines and immunization schedules, poor socioeconomic status, and residence in rural areas all are attributable to decreased rates of immunization completion. Parental education is one of the most important determiners of whether children will complete their vaccinations. In a study of two-parent households in Pakistan, it was shown that the father's knowledge about health most impacted immunization decisions, with an effect so large that some researchers contend improving education will improve health more than even the provision of health services. Widespread malnutrition in Pakistani children is a factor in lowered resistance to disabling diseases and reduced efficacy of the polio vaccine.

Polio has had drastic effects on the health of the population of Pakistan and on the nation's healthcare infrastructure and economy. The WHO estimates that 65–75% of polio cases in developing countries occur in children under 3 years of age, with 95% of all cases occurring in children under 5 years of age. Researchers at the School of Public Health at Johns Hopkins University quantified the disease burden of various diseases in Pakistan; in the year 1990, a Pakistani person with polio averaged a loss of 1.13 healthy life years to the disease. The duration of disability of polio, averaged over 1000 people, was 81.84 years, the equivalent of diseases including diphtheria, childhood meningitis, and measles.

== See also ==
- Children Parliament Pakistan
- Family planning in Pakistan
- Female infanticide in Pakistan
- Rape in Pakistan
- Right to Education Pakistan
- UNICEF Pakistan
