= Right to Education Pakistan =

Advocacy campaign

Right to Education Pakistan, also known as RTE Pakistan or simply RTE, is an advocacy campaign for equal education rights for all children in Pakistan. The RTE campaign stems from low enrollment levels in Pakistani schools, and low literacy levels (especially among Pakistani females) depicted by the Annual Status of Education Report (ASER). It functions under the Citizens Movement for Quality Education, an initiative by Idara-e-Taleem o Aagahi (ITA), or "The Centre of Education and Consciousness."

The RTE campaign urges government officials to enforce education laws set forth in Article 25-A of the Pakistani Constitution, which states "The State shall provide free and compulsory education to all children of the age of five to sixteen years in such manner as may be determined by law.” RTE also aims to mobilize parents, teachers, students/youth and civil society to demand "free and compulsory education" for all children.

== History ==
The state of education in Pakistan has received a lot of criticism due to a lack of funds for education in the country, and an unequal distribution of Pakistan's education resources. There existed no organization promoting education rights in Pakistan, and no major recognition of the importance of education by the Pakistani government until 1947, when an All Pakistan Education Conference convened, recognizing "Universal Primary Education" as imperative.

In 1959, a Commission on National Education was formed, which suggested that the educational system in Pakistan should pursue quality as an essential objective and recommended compulsory education for children.

In 1973, Article 37-B of the Pakistani Constitution was created, stating that "The State shall remove illiteracy and provide free and compulsory secondary education within minimum possible period." Also created in 1973 was Article 38-D of the Pakistani Constitution, which states "The State shall provide basic necessities of life, such as food, clothing, housing, education and medical relief, for all citizens, irrespective of sex, caste, creed or race, as are permanently or temporarily unable to earn their livelihood on account of infirmity, sickness or unemployment."

In 2010, Article 25-A of the Pakistani Constitution was created, stating that "The State shall provide free and compulsory education to all children of the age of five to sixteen years in such manner as may be determined by law."

Shortly after the passage of Article 25-A in Pakistan, ITA started the RTE campaign as a means of raising awareness for the new constitutional amendment, and promoting its enforcement.

== Campaigns and advocacy ==
=== Education Youth Ambassadors ===
The Education Youth Ambassadors program was set up in September 2014 by ITA in collaboration with A World At School (AWAS). The program was created build awareness for education rights amongst youth, and strengthen the youth movement for educational rights. The campaign has formed a growing network of over 300 youth ambassadors in Pakistan campaigning for education rights. Pakistani youth ages 18–29 can apply to be a part of the program. Once accepted, ambassadors are given training, and are expected to mobilize and organize other youth to fight for education rights, draft petitions, write letters to their legislature, and make their voices heard globally by writing blogs and posting on social media.

=== The Global Business Coalition for Education ===
The Global Business Coalition for Education (GBC-Education) Network is a community of companies, individuals, civil society representatives, and philanthropic, and governmental organizations promoting educational rights. Participants in the GBC-Education Network agree to use their influence, personal networks, core business, social responsibility, strategic investments, thought leadership, or philanthropy – in collaboration with companies, government, nonprofits and the educational community – to increase the number of children and youth who are in school and learning. ITA as an active and dynamic organization will be striving to include companies and business class in this movement. In this respect, ITA played a great role in making corporate companies and businessmen a part of GBC education network on March 29.

=== One Million Signature Campaign ===
Shortly after the creation of Article 25-A, RTE launched the One Million Signature Campaign, in which they set out to collect one million signatures from out of school children. The petition proposed that parliamentarians and political parties take the following steps to ensure the adequate enforcement of the constitutional amendment:

- Analyze Legislation for Right to Education Act for the Federal Capital Islamabad and draft legislations for all provinces on urgent basis which shall positively address norms of access, quality and equity;
- Affirm that the legislation defines roles, responsibilities and the implementation process explicitly;
- Ensure that the drafting of the law undergoes a transparent process of province and nationwide debate and consultation;
- Allocate at least 4% of the GDP for education provision across Pakistan;
- Devise mechanisms for effective and timely utilization of resources allocated for education;
- Inclusion of Right to Education for Quality learning outcomes in the manifesto of all political parties.

Overall, the campaign exceeded its goal, collecting 1,003,117 signatures from March 6 to July 10, 2012.

=== End Child Marriages in Pakistan ===
Because early marriages are related to low levels of education, RTE is aiming to reach politicians, youth, and parents through educational events to create awareness about the detrimental consequences of early marriage and to campaign and lobby for proper legislation. RTE is also providing legal and social aid to individuals affected by early marriages. Along with RTE, there are many partners such as with Idara-e-Taleem-o-Aagahi (ITA) and Rutgers WPF, assisting in supporting the end to child marriages in Pakistan.

=== Education Law Centres ===
RTE operates Education Law Centres (ELC) in New Jersey and Pennsylvania. The ELC in New Jersey was founded in 1973 for New Jersey's public school children and advocates for educational equality in the United States. It promotes this through coalition building, policy development, communications, research, and lobbying at state and federal level. Through Abbot v. Burke, ELC has advanced fair school funding, and safe and adequate school facilities, which has proved to be effective in closing student achievement gaps in New Jersey.

The ELC of Pennsylvania was founded in 1975 and has strived to make good public education accessible to underserved children such as children of color, children in foster homes, and English language learners. ELC does this through legal work by advocating for new laws and policies, and training and information-sharing.

== See also ==
- Family planning in Pakistan
