= Education in Pakistan =

Educational oversight
- Rana Tanveer Hussain: Minister of Education

General details
- Primary languages: English, Urdu
- System type: State, federal and private

Literacy (2023 Census)
- Total: 60.65%
- Male: 68%
- Female: 53%

Enrollment
- Total: 32.33% of population
- Primary: 67.57%
- Secondary: 43.82%
- Post secondary: 14.85%

Literacy Rate in each Pakistani District as of the 2017 Pakistan Census

Education in Pakistan is administered by the Federal Ministry of Education and the provincial governments. The federal government primarily plays a coordinating role, including curriculum development, accreditation and the financing of research and development. while the provinces are responsible for the implementation and management of educational institutions.

Article 25-A of the Constitution of Pakistan obligates the state to provide free and compulsory education to all children between the ages of five and sixteen years, in a manner prescribed by law."

The education system in Pakistan is generally divided into six levels: preschool (from the age of 3 to 5), primary (years one to five), middle (years six to eight), secondary (years nine and ten, leading to the Secondary School Certificate or SSC), intermediate (years eleven and twelve, leading to a Higher Secondary School Certificate or HSSC), and university programmes leading to undergraduate and graduate degrees. The Higher Education Commission established in 2002 is responsible for all universities and degree awarding institutes. It was established in 2002 with Atta-ur-Rahman as its founding chairman.

Pakistan still has a low literacy rate relative to other countries. As of 2022 Pakistan's literacy rates range from 96% in Islamabad to 23% in the Torghar District. Literacy rates vary by gender and region. In tribal areas female literacy is 9.5%, while Azad Kashmir has a literacy rate of 91%. Pakistan's population of children not in school (22.8 million children) is the second largest in the world after Nigeria. According to the data, Pakistan faces a significant unemployment challenge, particularly among its educated youth, with over 31% of them being unemployed. Moreover, women account for 51% of the overall unemployed population, highlighting a gender disparity in employment opportunities. Pakistan produces about 445,000 university graduates and 25,000 to 30,000 computer science graduates per year As of 2021.

According to a Gallup Pakistan analysis based on the Pakistan Bureau of Statistics National Census Report 2023, educational attainment in Pakistan remains heavily skewed toward lower levels despite long-term gains in literacy. The data show that 67.5% of the population remains below matriculation, while only 9.39% hold a bachelor's degree or higher. Within this group, 4.29% possess a two-year BA, 1.86% a four-year degree, and 3.24% hold postgraduate qualifications (master's, MPhil, or PhD). The findings indicate that access to higher education remains limited and uneven, reinforcing structural inequalities in social mobility. The analysis highlights pronounced urban–rural disparities. Postgraduate attainment stands at 6.18% in urban areas, compared with 1.27% in rural Pakistan, making urban residents more than twice as likely to hold a university degree. While gender parity exists at the national level in undergraduate attainment, this balance is largely driven by major cities. Rural women emerge as the most disadvantaged group, facing persistent barriers related to access, mobility, and institutional availability. Significant provincial inequalities are also evident. The Islamabad Capital Territory leads with approximately 17% of residents holding a university degree, followed by Punjab (~7%), Sindh (~5.5%), Khyber Pakhtunkhwa (~4%), and Balochistan (~2.5%), reflecting uneven distribution of educational infrastructure and economic opportunity. Although women in metropolitan areas increasingly outperform men at the postgraduate level, this progress is geographically concentrated and does not extend to much of rural Pakistan. Gallup Pakistan concludes that, given Pakistan's young demographic profile (with more than 60% of the population under the age of 30) the country risks developing an under-skilled workforce unless transitions into secondary and tertiary education improve. Expanding university access, addressing rural and provincial disparities, and aligning higher education with labor-market needs are identified as critical to realizing Pakistan's demographic potential.

== Stages of formal education ==
=== Primary education ===
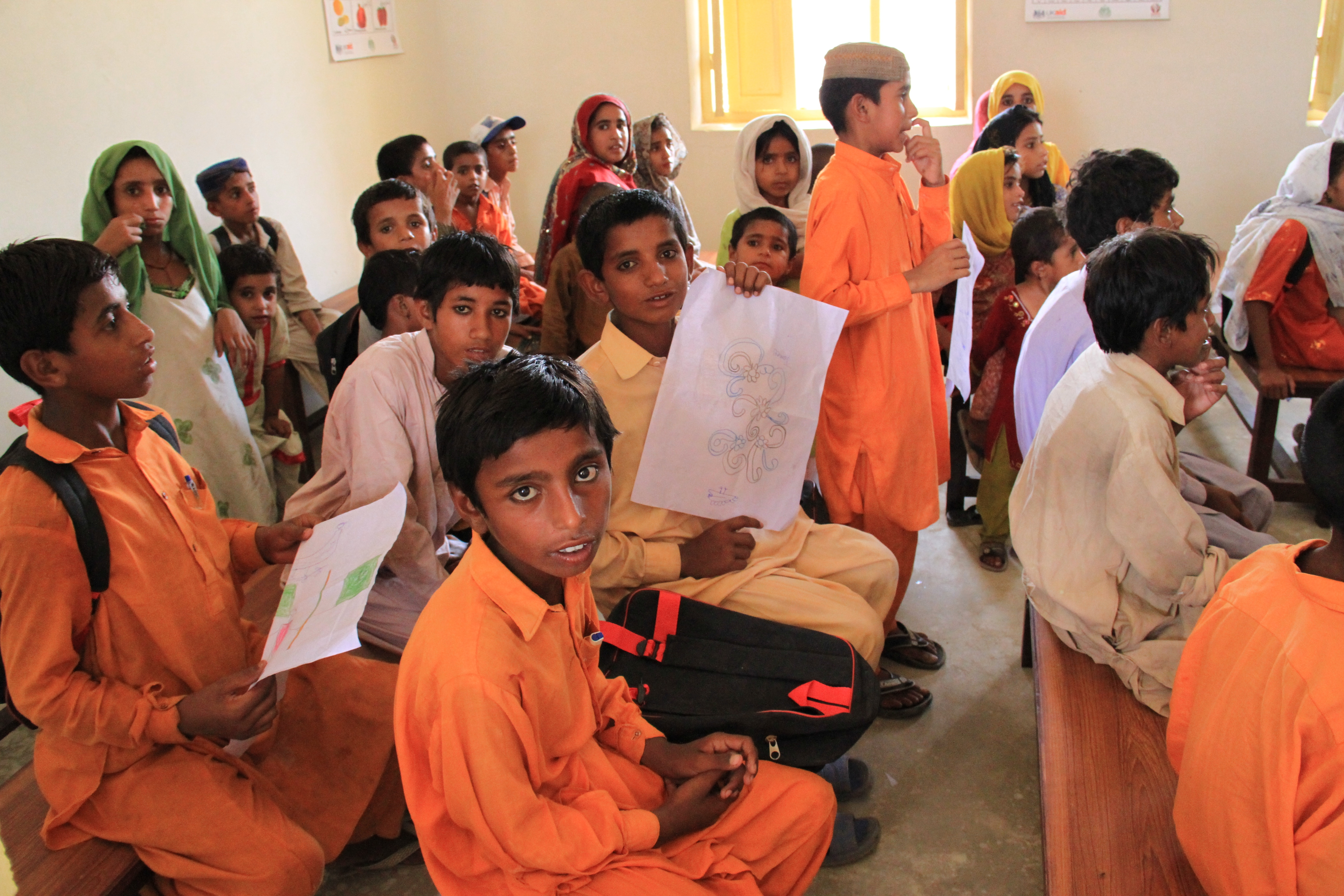
A primary school in a village in the Sindh region

Only about 67.5% of Pakistani children finish primary school education. The standard national system of education is mainly inspired by the English educational system. Pre-school education is designed for the 3–5 years old and usually consists of three stages: Play Group, Nursery and Kindergarten (also called 'KG' or 'Prep'). After pre-school education, students go through junior school from years 1 to 5. This is followed by middle school from years 6 to 8. In middle school, single-sex education is usually preferred by the Pakistani community, but co-education exists in cities. The curriculum is usually subject to the institution. The eight commonly studied disciplines are:

- Arts
- Computer Studies and ICT
- General Science (including Physics, Chemistry and Biology)
- Modern languages and literature i.e. Urdu and English
- Mathematics
- Religious Education i.e. Islamic Studies
- Social Studies (including Civics, Geography, History, Economics, Sociology and sometimes elements of law, politics and PHSE)
- Pakistan Studies (including Civics, Geography, History, Economics, Sociology and sometimes elements of law, politics and PHSE of Pakistan)

Schools may also offer drama studies, music and physical education but these are usually not examined or marked. Home economics is sometimes taught to female students, whereas topics related to astronomy, environmental management and psychology are frequently included in textbooks of general science. Sometimes archaeology and anthropology are taught in textbooks of social studies. SRE is not taught at most schools in Pakistan, although this trend is being rebuked by some urban schools. Provincial and regional languages such as Punjabi, Sindhi, Pashto and others may be taught in their respective provinces, particularly in regional language-medium schools. Some institutes give instruction in foreign languages such as German, Turkish, Arabic, Persian, French and Chinese. The language of instruction depends on the nature of the institution itself, whether it is an English-medium school or an Urdu-medium school.

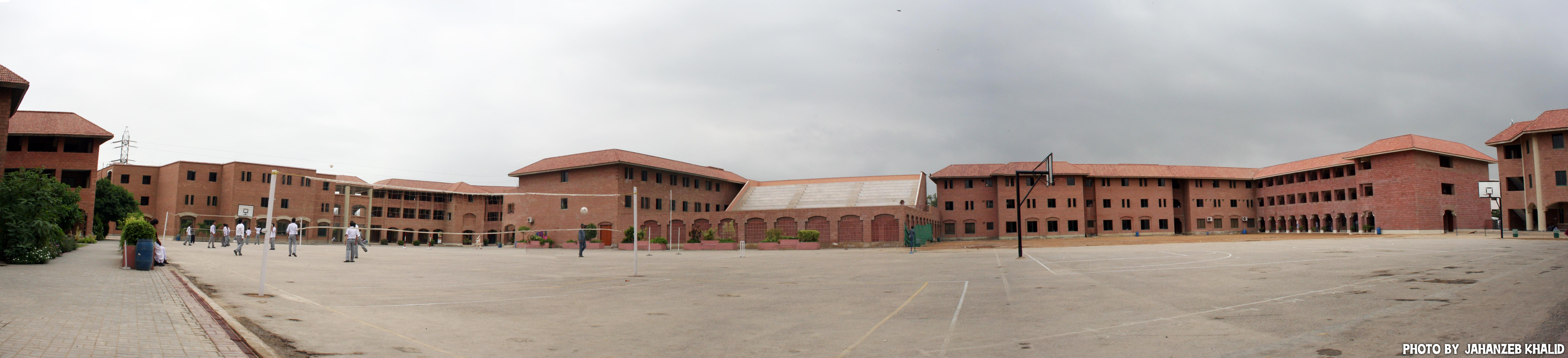
The City School in Karachi

As of 2009, Pakistan faces a net primary school attendance rate for both sexes of 66%, a figure below estimated world average of 90 per cent.

An English textbook dialogue:

"Mother: Ali,...not going to pray today?
Ali: Mama,...not feeling well.
Mother: ..you are grown up now,
..should not miss your prayers.
Ali: Mama! Why do we pray?
Mother: Because ...to thank ALLAH
Almighty for His blessings.
Ali: Can't we skip prayers
even for a single day?
Mother: No, we cannot.
Ali: Ok mama. I'll not skip...
Mother: Good..."

— ~English Textbook of

Punjab Textbook Board
of Year 8 in Pakistan

As of 2007, public expenditure on education was 2.2 percent of GNPs, a marginal increase from 2 percent before 1984–85. Very little (only about 12%) of the total national allocation to education goes to higher education with about 88% being spent on lower-level education. Lower education institutions such as primary schools suffer under such conditions as the lower income classes are unable to enjoy subsidies and quality education.

=== Secondary education ===
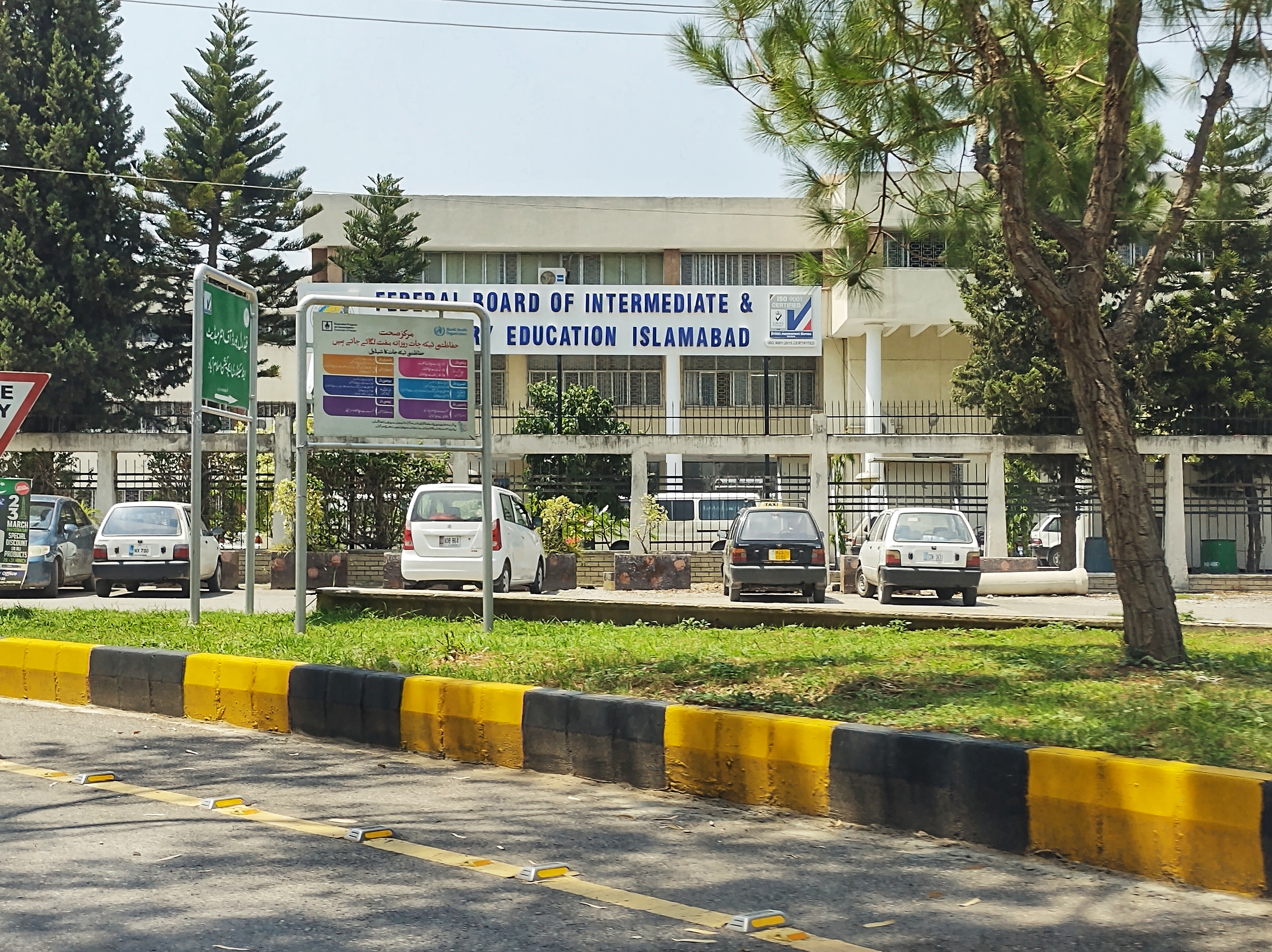
Federal Board of Intermediate and Secondary Education office in Islamabad

Secondary education in Pakistan begins in year 9 and lasts for four years. After the end of each of the school years, students are required to pass a national examination administered by a regional Board of Intermediate and Secondary Education (or BISE).

Upon completion of year 9, students are expected to take a standardised test in each of the first parts of their academic subjects (SSC-I). They take the tests of the second parts of the same courses at the end of year 10 (SSC-II). Upon successful completion of these examinations, they are awarded a Secondary School Certificate (or SSC). This is locally termed a matriculation certificate or matric for short. The curriculum usually includes a combination of eight courses including electives (such as Biology, Chemistry, Computer and Physics) as well as compulsory subjects (such as Mathematics, English, Urdu, Islamic studies and Pakistan Studies). The SSC exams consist of a total of 1100 marks divided between 9th and 10th. The marks are divided in each year follows: 75 marks for Maths, English and Urdu, 50 marks for Islamic Studies (or ethics for Non Muslim students) and Pakistan Studies, 65 marks for Sciences (Biology, Chemistry, Physics). An additional 90 marks are allotted for practicals (30 for each science). Students then enter an intermediate college and complete years 11 and 12. Upon completion of each of the two years, they again take standardised tests in their subjects (HSSC-I and HSSC-II). Upon successful completion of these examinations, students are awarded the Higher Secondary School Certificate (or HSSC). This level of education is also called the FSc/FA/ICS or intermediate. There are many streams students can choose for years 11 and 12, such as pre-medical, pre-engineering, humanities (or social sciences), computer science and commerce. Each stream consists of three electives and three compulsory subjects of English, Urdu, Islamiat (year 11 only) and Pakistan Studies (year 12 only).

Alternative qualifications in Pakistan are available but these are maintained by other examination boards instead of BISE. Most common alternative is the General Certificate of Education (or GCE), where SSC and HSSC are replaced by Ordinary Level (or O Level) and Advanced Level (or A Level) respectively. Other qualifications include IGCSE which replaces SSC. GCE and GCSE O Level, IGCSE and GCE AS/A Level are managed by British examination boards of CIE of the Cambridge Assessment and/or Edexcel International of the Pearson PLC. Generally, 8–10 courses are selected by students at GCE O Levels and 3–5 at GCE A Levels.

Advanced Placement (or AP) is an alternative option, but it is much less common than GCE or IGCSE. In this the secondary school education is referred to as 'High School Education' instead. AP exams are monitored by a North American examination board, College Board, and can only be given under supervision of centers which are registered with the College Board, unlike GCE O/AS/A Level and IGCSE which can be given privately.

Another type of education in Pakistan is called "Technical Education" and combines technical and vocational education. The vocational curriculum starts at year 5 and ends with year 10. Three boards, the Punjab Board of Technical Education (PBTE), KPK Board of Technical Education (KPKBTE) and Sindh Board of Technical Education (SBTE) offer courses like Technical School Certificate (TSC) (equivalent to 10th grade) and Diploma of Associate Engineering (DAE) in engineering disciplines like Civil, Chemical, Architecture, Mechanical, Electrical, Electronics and Computer. DAE is a three years programme of instructions which is equivalent to 12th grade. Diploma holders are called associate engineers. They can either join their respective field or pursue B.Tech. and BE in their related discipline after DAE.

Furthermore, the A-level qualification inherited from the British education system is popular in the private schools of Pakistan. Three to four subjects are selected as per the student's interests. It is usually divided into a combination of similar subjects within the same category, like Business, Arts and Sciences. This is a two-year programme. A-level institutions are different from high school. You must secure admission in such an institution, upon the completion of high school, i.e. the British system equivalent being O-levels. O-levels and A-levels are usually not taught within the same school.

=== Tertiary education ===
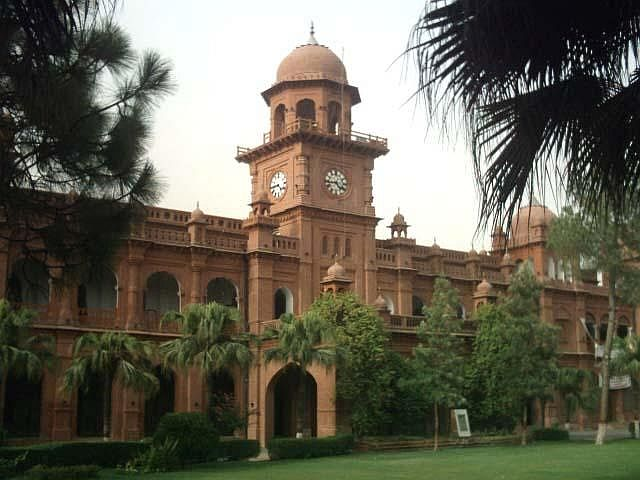
The University of the Punjab, established 1882 in Lahore, is the oldest university of Pakistan.

According to UNESCO's 2009 Global Education Digest, 6% of Pakistanis (9% of men and 3.5% of women) were university graduates as of 2007. Pakistan plans to increase this figure to 10% by 2015 and subsequently to 15% by 2020. There is also a great deal of variety between age cohorts. Less than 6% of those in the age cohort 55–64 have a degree, compared to 8% in the 45–54 age cohort, 11% in the 35–44 age cohort and 16% in the age cohort 25–34.

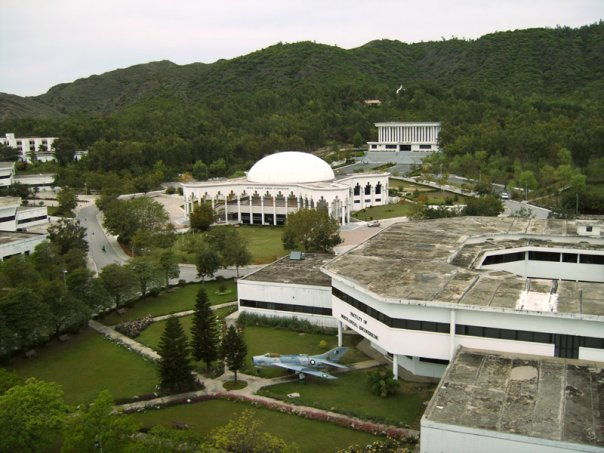
GIK Institute from the Clock Tower

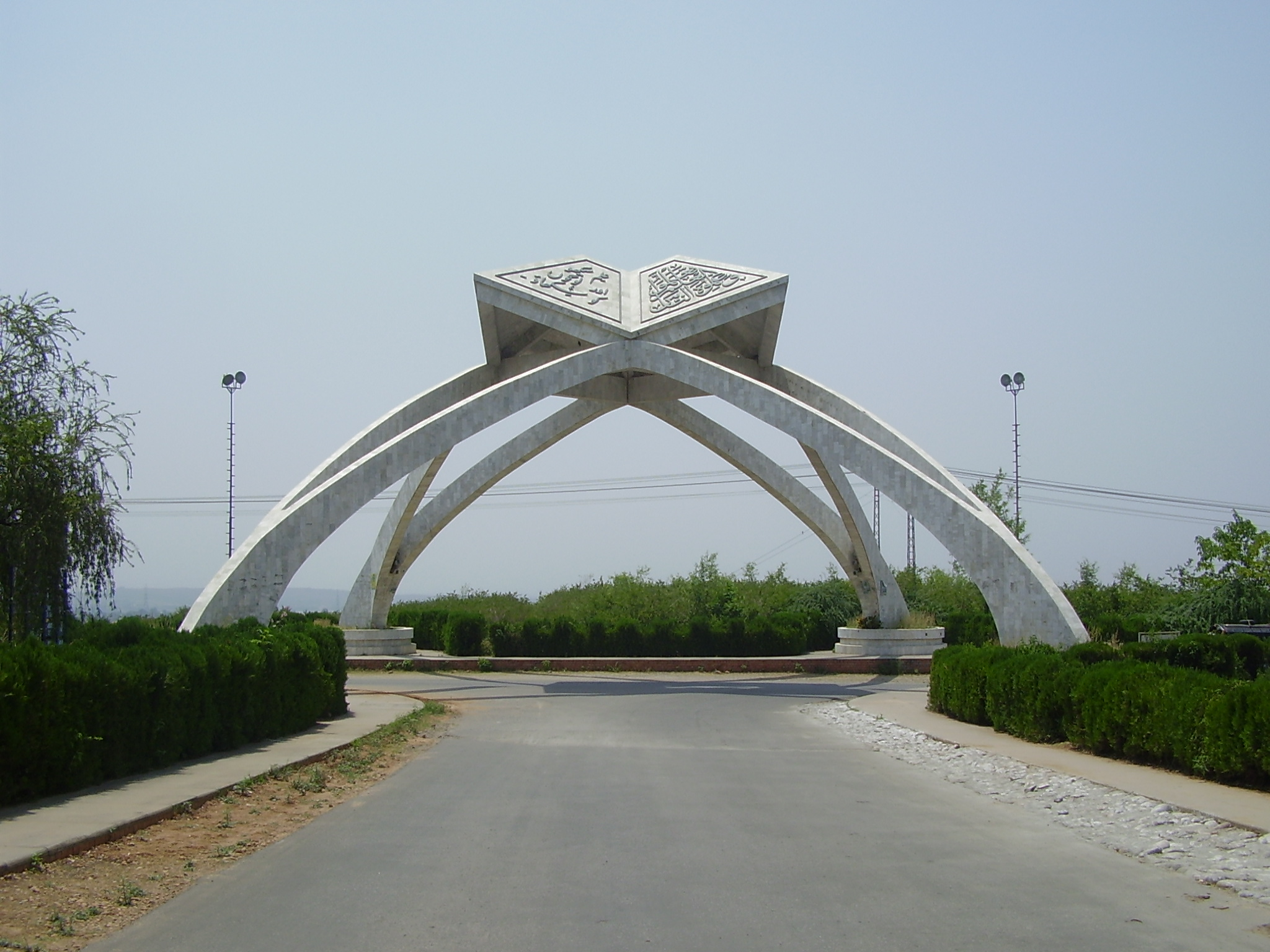
Quaid-i-Azam University entrance

After earning their HSSC, students may study in a professional institute for Bachelor's degree courses such as engineering (BE/BS/BSc Engineering), computer sciences (BS/BSc/BSc Engineering), medicine (MBBS), dentistry (BDS), veterinary medicine (DVM), law (LLB), architecture (BArch), pharmacy (Pharm.D) and nursing (BSc Nursing). These courses require four or five years of study. The accreditation councils which accredit the above professional degrees and register these professionals are: Pakistan Engineering Council (PEC), National Computing Education Accreditation Council (NCEAC), Pakistan Medical Commission (PMC), Pakistan Veterinary Medical Council (PVMC), Pakistan Bar Council (PBC), Pakistan Council for Architects and Town Planners (PCATP), Pharmacy Council of Pakistan (PCP) and Pakistan Nursing Council (PNC). Students can also attend a university for Bachelor of Arts (BA), Bachelor of Science (BSc), Bachelor of Commerce (BCom) or Bachelor of Business Administration (BBA) degree courses.

There are two types of bachelor's degree courses in Pakistan: Pass or Honours. Pass degrees require two years of study and students normally read three optional subjects (such as Chemistry or [Education] Economics) in addition to almost equal number of compulsory subjects (such as English, Islamiyat and Pakistan Studies). Honours degrees require four years of study, and students normally specialize in a chosen field of study, such as Biochemistry (BSc Hons. Biochemistry). The Pass bachelor's degrees are now slowly being phased out for Honours throughout the country.

Regarding teacher education programs, there are multiple paths in which a pre-service teacher can take. The first option includes 12 years of schooling. Then, the person would receive an associate degree in education. Finally, they would receive a bachelor's degree in education for two more years to become an elementary teacher. The second option available would include 12 years of schooling and four years of schooling to receive a Bachelor of Education for either elementary or secondary educators. The other options range from 14 to 16 years of schooling. Finally, one could receive their master's or Ph.D. in education. Khmais in their article "Teacher Education in Pakistan" provides the following information: There are many teacher training institutes throughout Pakistan. In the past, there had been around 40,000 teachers being trained in short-term programs per year. Even with this amount of training, there are a few criticisms regarding teacher training. These programs are more knowledge based and not application based. There is more focus and interest on memorizations to qualify and pass exams. Lastly, these trainers do not have any extra qualifications and are not highly qualified to begin with.

Pak India Comparison of Research publications per 10 million population for period 2000–2018; Pakistan green India blue;Pakistan overtook India in 2017 due to reforms introduced by Prof. Atta-ur-Rahman FRS

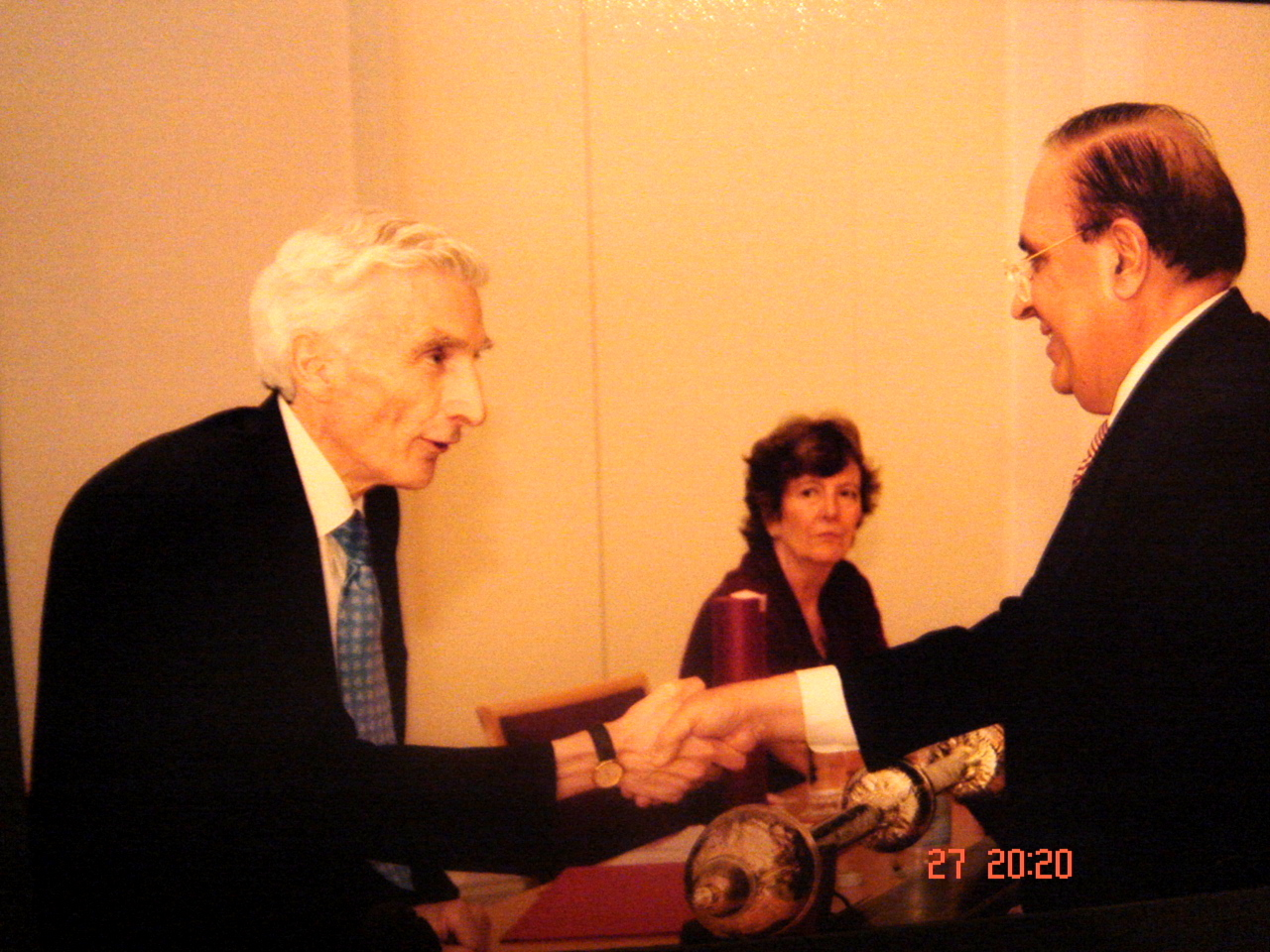
Prof. Atta-ur-Rahman receiving the Fellowship of Royal Society(London) from Prof. Martin Reese, after signing the 360 year old book of the Royal Society with a feather pen.

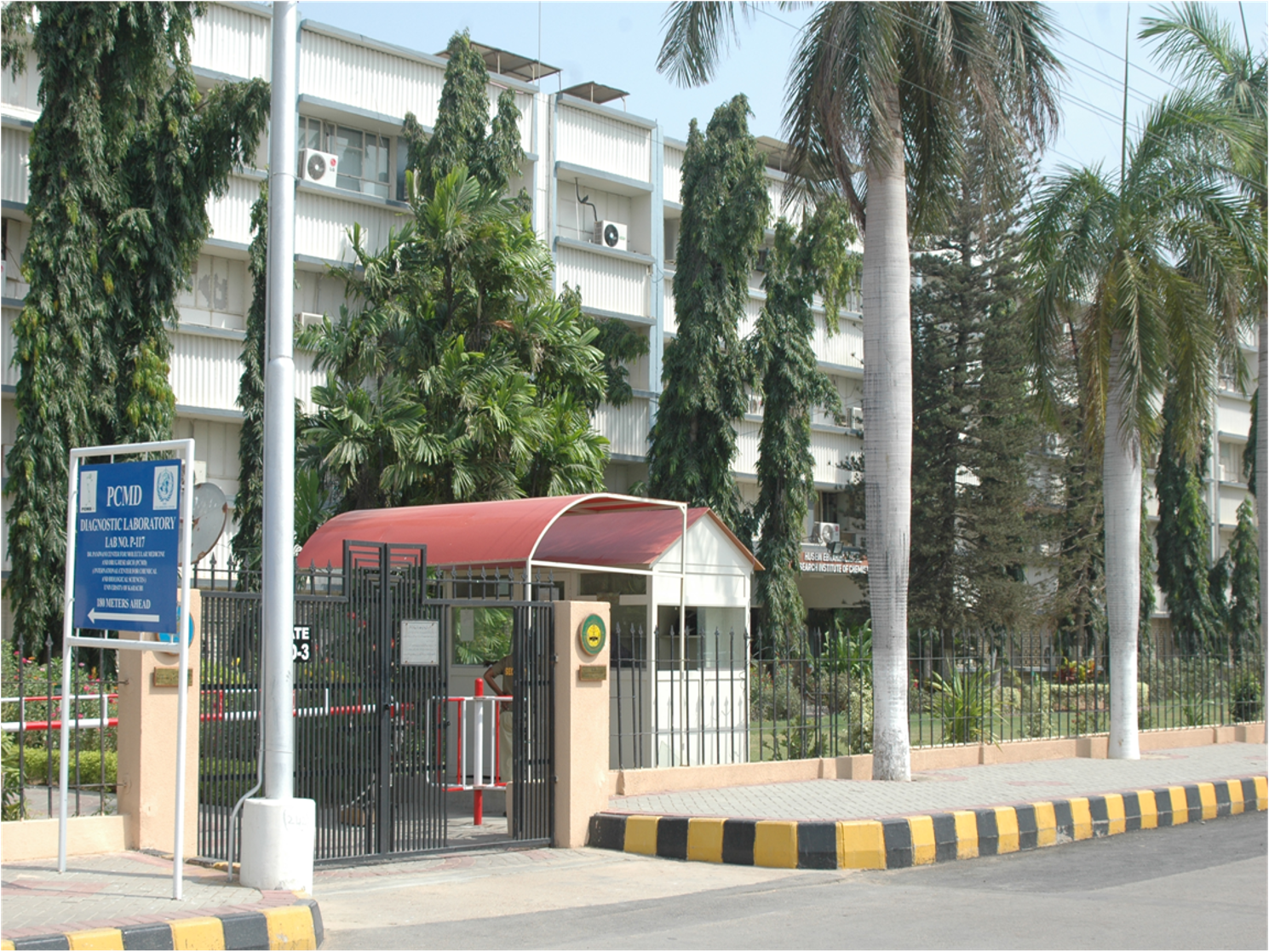
HEJ Research Institute of Chemistry is integral part of International Center of Chemical and Biological Sciences at University of Karachi, Pakistan's leading research center

Dr. Panjwani Center for Molecular Medicine and Drug Research is part of International Center for Chemical Biological Sciences, at University of Karachi, the UNESCO Regional Center of Excellence.

Most of Master's degree programs require two years education. Master of Philosophy (MPhil) is available in most of the subjects and can be undertaken after doing Masters. Doctor of Philosophy (PhD) education is available in selected areas and is usually pursued after earning a MPhil degree. Students pursuing MPhil or PhD degrees must choose a specific field and a university that is doing research work in that field. MPhil and PhD education in Pakistan requires a minimum of two years of study. Various Pakistani universities offer two-year M.Phil. or MS degree programs in Arts, Science, and Technology for graduates who have completed 16-year schooling (BS or master's degrees) in their relevant field.

=== Non-formal and informal education ===
Out of the formal system, the public sector runs numerous schools and training centres, most being vocational-oriented. Among those institutions can be found vocational schools, technical training centres and agriculture and vocational training centres. An apprenticeship system is also framed by the state of Pakistan.

Informal education is also important in Pakistan and regroups mostly school-leavers and low-skilled individuals, who are trained under the supervision of a senior craftsman. Few institutes are run by corporates to train university students eligible for jobs and provide experience during education fulfilling a gap between university and industry for example: Appxone Private Limited is training Engineers with professional development on major subjects of Electronics and Computer science and other fields.

Informal education has also increasingly become a field for not-for-profit organisations in the country. Among those are visible projects, like the MagnifiScience Centre in Karachi.

=== Madrassas ===
Madrassas are Islamic seminaries. Most Madrasas teach mostly Islamic subjects such as Tafseer (Interpretation of the Quran), Hadith (sayings of Muhammad), Fiqh (Islamic Law), Arabic language and include some non-Islamic subjects, such as logic, philosophy, mathematics, to enable students to understand the religious ones. The number of madrassas are popular among Pakistan's poorest families in part because they feed and house their students. Estimates of the number of madrasas vary between 12,000 and 40,000. In some areas of Pakistan they outnumber the public schools.

== Gender disparity ==
The society in Pakistan is profoundly patriarchal. Throughout Pakistan's educational system, there is a gender disparity between males and females. In fact, according to the 2016 Global Gender Gap Report, Pakistan was ranked the second worst country in the world regarding gender inequality.

In Pakistan, gender discrimination in education occurs among the poorest households. Only 18% of Pakistani women have received 10 years or more of schooling. Among other criticisms the Pakistani education system faces is the gender disparity in enrollment levels. However, in recent years some progress has been made in trying to fix this problem. In 1990–91, the female to male ratio (F/M ratio) of enrollment was 0.47 for primary level of education. It reached to 0.74 in 1999–2000, showing the F/M ratio has improved by 57.44% within the decade. For the middle level of education it was 0.42 in the start of decade and increased to 0.68 by the end of decade, so it has improved almost 62%. In both cases the gender disparity is decreased but relatively more rapidly at middle level.

Additionally, Pakistan has shown quite a bit of improvement since 2006 for literacy and educational attainment for women (Moin et al., 2018). One example of this progress recently made in 2010 was that primary education is a legal right for children ranging from five to sixteen years old. The gender disparity in enrollment at secondary level of education was 0.4 in 1990-91 and 0.67 in 1999–2000, showing that the disparity decreased by 67.5% in the decade. At the college level, it was 0.50 in 1990–91 and reached 0.81 in 1999–2000, showing that the disparity decreased by 64%. The gender disparity has decreased comparatively rapidly at secondary school.

But, low female enrollment is still a very prevalent issue. A reason for this is that females who are a vulnerable group, are less likely to access as much education as boys. If they do go to school, this also affects their academic performance. In fact, in the 1990s, only 20% out of 50% enrollment were females who attended formal education. Factually, since female enrollment is so much lower compared to males across all of the provinces in Pakistan, literacy rates along with dropout rates are much higher. In fact, men have a literacy rate of around 67% versus women who have a literacy rate of 42%. Due to this early on prevention of females attending schools, males dominate the education field. Teacher-wise males dominate teaching profession by 2:1 with females unable to teach or being barred. If they do, they are limited due to cultural norms and pressures. In fact, there is 1100 males to 1000 female ratio. Additionally, there is not a female university leader presence in the whole country. Even with this improvement, due to their low social status and inequities regarding access to education, even when they comprise half of the population, women are still facing these burdens. This is true even after they signed the Millennium Development Goals. It was meant to eliminate gender disparity in education by 2015. With the little improvement done by the government, people have started to believe that parents prefer to educate boys rather than girls. In regard to education, there are large differences between male and females. One issue is the lack of physical infrastructure that is a particular barrier for girls being able to access education. Families feel that these schools are unsafe for them. Government schools tend to be overcrowded and a far distance for children. However, there does not seem to be gender segregation in the schools that were visited in a study cited. Research indicates that female university students face more gender discrimination than males in the capital city of Pakistan.

A particularly interesting aspect of this gender disparity is representation of Pakistani women in STEMM (science, technology, engineering, mathematics and medicine). In 2013, the issue of women doctors in Pakistan was highlighted in local and international media. According to Pakistan Medical and Dental Council, in many medical colleges in Pakistan, as many as 80% of students are women, but majority of these women do not go on to actually practice medicine, creating a shortage of doctors in rural areas and several specialties (especially surgical fields). In 2014, Pakistan Medical and Dental Council introduced a gender-based admission policy, restricting women to 50% of available seats (based on the gender ratios in general population). This quota was challenged and subsequently deemed unconstitutional (and discriminatory) by Lahore High Court. Research indicates several problems faced by women doctors in Pakistan in their career and education, including lack of implementation of women-friendly policies (like maternity leave, breast-feeding provisions and child-care facilities), and systemic sexism prevalent in medical education and training. Pakistan's patriarchal culture, where women's work outside the home is generally considered less important than her family and household obligations, also make it difficult for women to balance a demanding career. Despite the importance of the issue, no new policies (except now-defunct-quota) have been proposed or implemented to ensure women's retention in workforce.

However, there may be a current possible solution to the gender gap throughout Pakistan. The possible solution would be low-cost private schools or LCPSs which may correct the prevailing gender inequalities in Pakistan. However, after the research, male students are more likely to attend low-cost private schools than female students. This further widens the gender imbalance in the field of education throughout Pakistan. But, if females are able to attend, they academically outperform male students. This is true except for the field of mathematics. This is possibly caused by the fact that a lot of professions are not seen as female oriented. All in all, in the future, these LCPSs may be able to reach more and more of the marginalized groups of people. In the end, a large factor that played into if parents had their children attend these schools were based on their education level. Mostly, on the father's than the mother's education level.

In the end, even with all of the Pakistani government's efforts regarding educational policies, they have tried in vain to adjust and fix the gender disparities that its country is facing. It seems that disinterest of parents to educate their daughters, cultural and religious barriers, high tuition cost, and the poor quality in education are the major reasons for gender disparities in this country. In general, females face many other disparities, as well. In fact, there is less money spend on them for health, education, and household expenditures. With the inadequate education and skills, poor health conditions and lack of access to resources actually decrease the quality of female's life.

However, looking beyond binary genders, there is the case of transgender individuals in Pakistan. According to the Australian Journal of Asian Law, in 2018, Pakistan defined what they consider to be "transgender". According to the Pakistani parliament, a transgender individual is a person who is; intersex, eunuch assigned male when born, or a transgender man/woman whose gender differs from what they were assigned as at birth. They also passed The Pakistan Transgender Persons (Protection of Rights) Act of 2018. This act has many provisions to it that ensure the basic fundamental human rights for transgender individuals. Not only that but should enforced in the same way as cisgender individuals. These rights include; education, employment, health, accessing public places and transportation, voting, holding public office, etc. Going one step further, this also includes the right to recognition as a transgender person. They shall have the right to be recognized as their self-perceived gender and they also will have the right to register themselves as such legally. However, before this act, the Pakistani government recognized five different genders. Additionally, as this journal has stated later on, that it marks transgender individuals as "other" compared to cisgender individuals.

Even with this act, these individuals are abused and are marginalized. For example, hijras, or males who act "feminine" are ridiculed and harassed". Once again, the more "feminine" gender is targeted and have less access to opportunities than their male counterparts. In conclusion, gender disparity is in most aspects of life, going beyond binary genders.

== Qualitative dimension ==
In Pakistan, the quality of education has a declining trend. A shortage of teachers and poorly equipped laboratories have resulted in the out-dated curriculum that has little relevance to present-day needs. The education is based solely on cramming and the students lack professional as well as communicational skills, when they graduate from an institution. Moreover, the universities are expensive, due to which the Pakistani students cannot afford higher education. The universities do not provide skills that are in demand in the market.

However, there have been numerous reforms to attempt to raise the quality of education in Pakistan. Examples of these include the Convention of the Rights of the Children (1989), the Millennium Development Goals (UN 1990), and the Sustainable Development Goals (2015). This last reform included free and compulsory education for all children, and access to quality education at the basic level.

== Teacher education ==
Teacher education reform is crucial in improving education in Pakistan. Teacher training programs at universities lack qualified professionals. Almost one-third of universities in Balochistan do not have professors in their teacher education departments and there was not a PhD in education at any of the universities in Balochistan. Teachers are the focal point of establishing progressive education. Teacher preparation programs need funding and consistency to produce quality, effective teachers. Teacher reform needs to continue by establishing resources and investments. Time needs to be invested in updating curriculum and teacher education facilities. Investments must be made in updating building infrastructures, libraries, IT departments, and laboratories.

Some major obstacles faced by the education system in Pakistan include: access to education, equal opportunities, relevance, required teachers, and environment. There are parts of Pakistan where government leaders have not enacted strategies to help children attend schools. Many children live too far away from school to receive a formal education. Female students are also not offered the same classes as male students in the majority of the schools. In addition to female students being deprived of opportunities, female teachers are also lacking adequate teaching spaces. Another point of weakness education in Pakistan faces is relevance in content. Content should teach students how to solve societal problems and not assist in political conflicts. Students need more opportunities to deepen their knowledge of how to attend to economic and social needs.

Pakistan teachers face knowledge gaps regarding human rights due to outdated teacher education curriculum. Many Pakistani leaders and teachers hold conservative beliefs that education policies need to remain aligned with national Islamic ideology, which does not focus on human rights. Global policy makers are aware that teachers promote human rights and ethics and should receive a course in their teacher training programs about basic human rights. A study revealed that reflective writing and case studies have been the best approach to raising awareness about human rights issues in teacher preparation programs in Pakistan.

Teacher education has an impact on the general education of the country. Within Pakistan there are many common problems within schools, this includes not having proper training facilities, small termed training period, lack of in-service training for teachers, and other issues.

There is a shortage of teachers in Pakistan. Labs are old, outdated, and poorly equipped, and curriculum is very outdated and does not have much relevance to today's world. Issues within the schools include defective teaching materials and curriculum, substandard and under qualified teachers, and overcrowded classrooms.

== Technical and vocational education ==
Education plays a crucial role in developing countries by transmitting necessary life skills to the future citizens. After the eighteenth amendment was abolished in 2010, there was more autonomy available to people in the health care and education spectrums. Technical and Vocational Education Training (TVET) raised attention because education helps prepare students for future employment. TVET classes also offer money management lessons, personal and family health practices, and healthcare information. Providing proper TVET site management, adequate teacher salaries, competent teachers, up-to-date curriculum, and equity in the programs are challenges faced by Pakistani leaders. The major goals of TVET include investing in the country's workforce to stimulate the economy and redistribute the wealth.

== Teacher satisfaction ==
Life satisfaction is a characteristic linked to teacher workplace experiences. A recent study in Pakistan compared teachers who were employed by regular institutions and special education institutions. The study asked participants questions about their emotional intelligence and life satisfaction. The results from the teacher institutions study showed that teachers of Pakistani special education institutions reported higher levels of emotional intelligence or self-awareness about their issues and provided ways on how to fix their own problems. Special education teachers also reported higher levels of life satisfaction. The study revealed that the general mood of the workplace is correlated with emotional intelligence. Further research is needed to investigate the mood differences between special education institution environments and regular education institution environments.

== Distance learning ==
During the COVID-19 pandemic, the nation launched an educational television channel, Teleschool. Teleschool is programmed with lessons for kindergarten through high school. Each grade has one hour of course material broadcast per day.

Teleschool instructional videos are in Urdu and English, Pakistan's official languages and the languages used for the country's national curriculum.

The Ministry of Education is also trying to develop instructional programming for radio since Teleschool isn't available to the nation's poorest families.

Because of COVID-19, Pakistan had to consider using online classes. However, many students, especially in rural areas, do not have access to the Internet. Because of this it alters the process of online learning especially for poor students or those living in rural areas.

Digital education has been started in many of the educational institution in Pakistan to utilize time efficiently during the current time.

The distance learning mode of education has been recognized as a great resource to give equal access to education to the women from remote areas of developing countries including Pakistan where many women otherwise would not attend school.

At the post-secondary level, there has been much research conducted about the strengths, weaknesses, opportunities and threats when practicing distance learning. They found that this model is great for those that don't live within the same city as where they go to school. It gives them an opportunity to get an education without having to leave their homes. It has been difficult for students that still have to go into the university, because of the distance learning model it has slowed and put a delay in many research processes. The teachers have a lower salary package as well because they are not requiring them to come into work.

== Achievements ==
Some of the famous alumni of Pakistan are as follow:

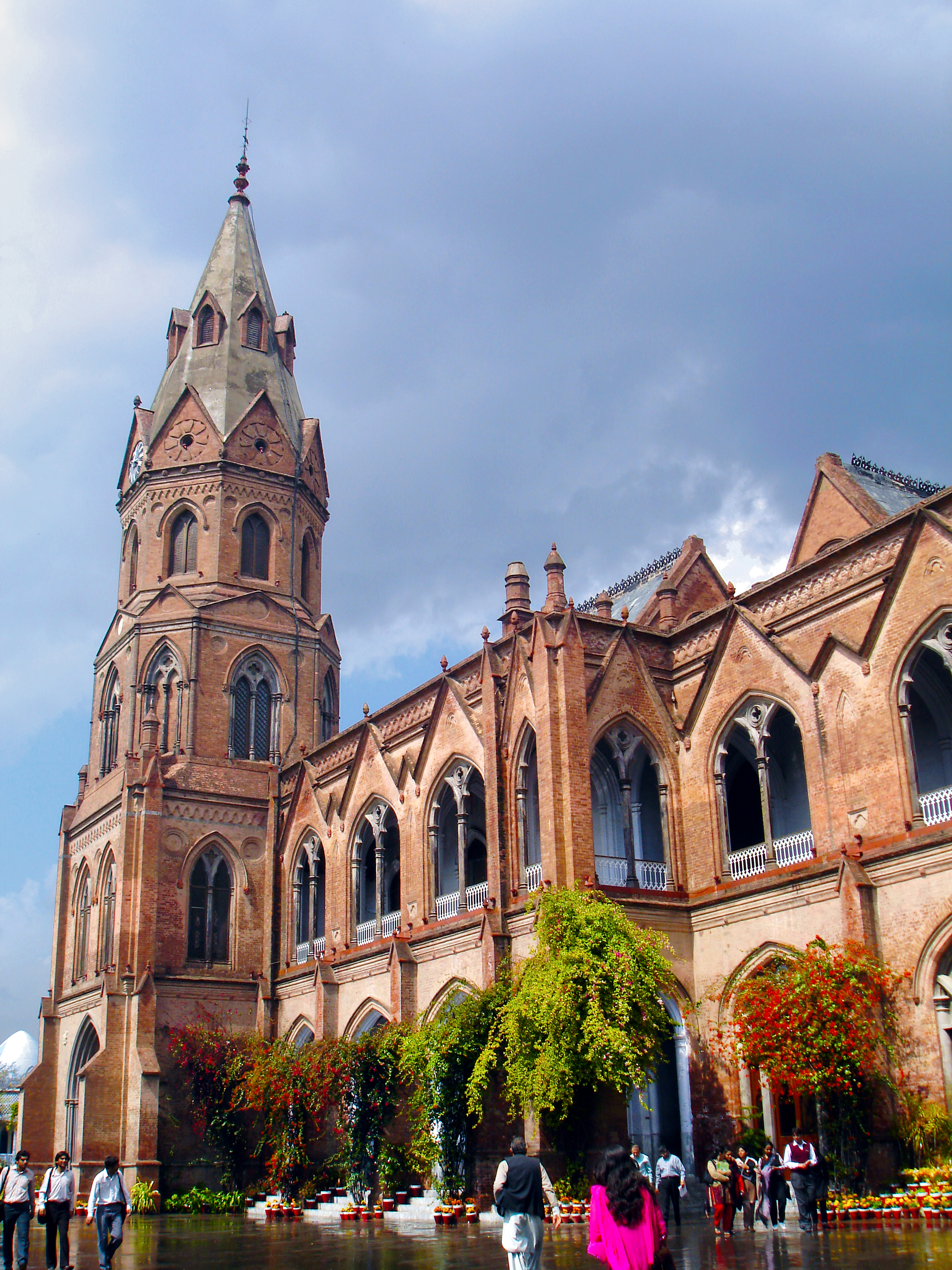
Government College University (Lahore)

=== Abdus Salam ===
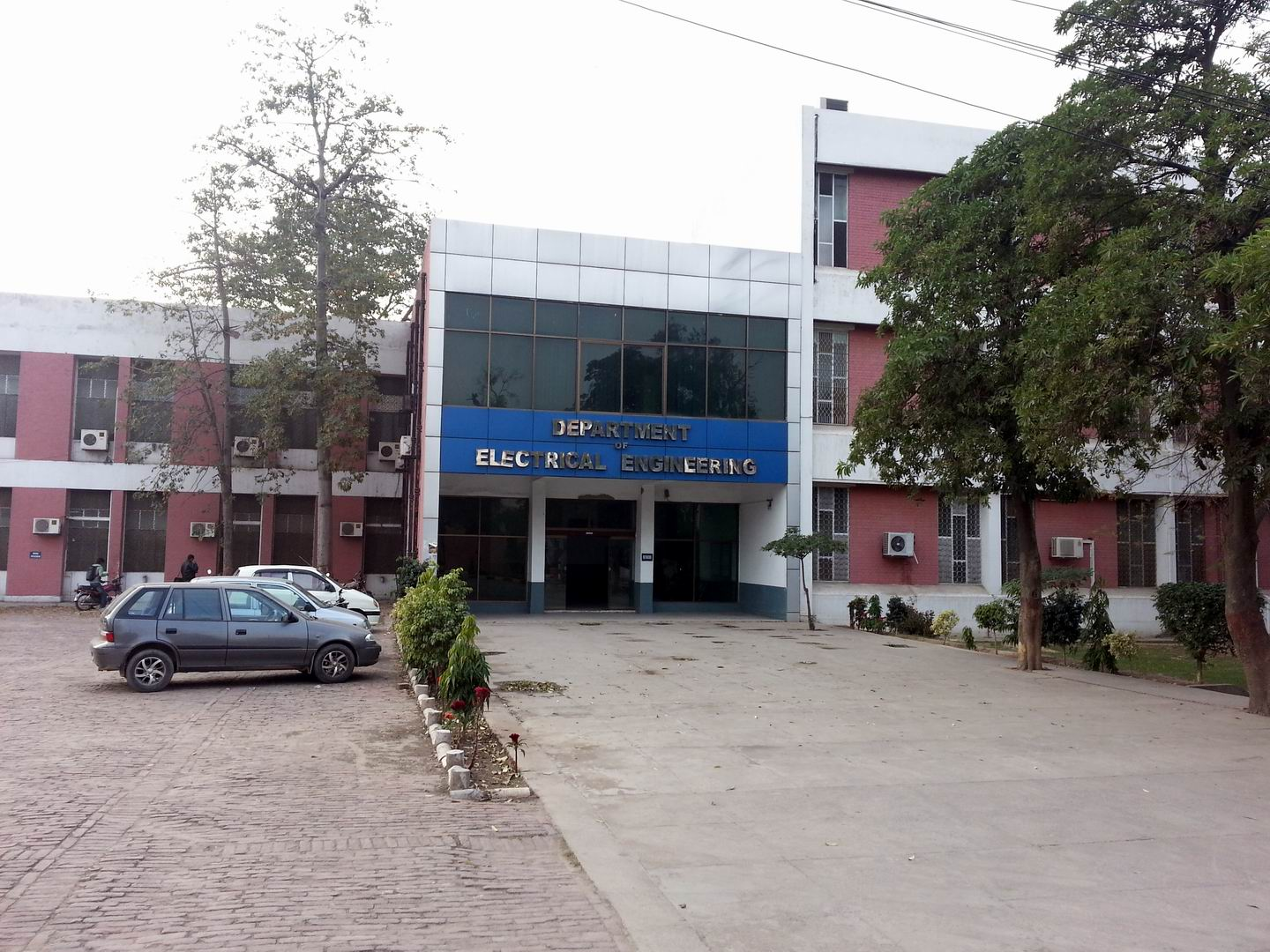
University of Engineering and Technology, Lahore

Abdus Salam was a Pakistani theoretical physicist and Nobel laureate in physics for his work on the electroweak unification of the electromagnetic and weak forces. Salam, Sheldon Glashow and Steven Weinberg shared the 1979 Nobel prize for this work. Salam holds the distinction of being the first Pakistani to receive the Nobel Prize in any field. Salam heavily contributed to the rise of Pakistani physics to the Physics community in the world.

=== Atta-ur-Rahman ===
Atta-ur-Rahman is a Pakistani scientist known for his work in the field of natural product chemistry. He has over 1200 research papers, books and patents attributed to him, that have won him over 34,000 citations and h index of 74. He was elected as Fellow of the Royal Society (London) in 2006 and won the UNESCO Science Prize in 1999. The revolutionary changes that he brought in the higher education as well as science and technology sectors won him numerous national and international awards, including the highest national award, Nishan-i-Imtiaz. He also won the highest award for international collaboration of China. He was also awarded a high civil award of the Government of Austria in recognition of his services to science

=== Ayub Ommaya ===
Ayub Ommaya was a Pakistani neurosurgeon who heavily contributed to his field. Over 150 research papers have been attributed to him. He also invented the Ommaya Reservoir medical procedure. It is a system of delivery of medical drugs for treatment of patients with brain tumours.

=== Mahbub-ul-Haq ===
Mahbub-ul-Haq was a Pakistani economist who along with Indian economist Amartya Sen developed the Human Development Index (HDI), the modern international standard for measuring and rating human development.

=== Ismat Beg ===
Ismat Beg is a Pakistani mathematician famous for his work in fixed point theory, and multicriteria decision making methods. Ismat Beg is Higher Education Commission Distinguished National Professor at Lahore School of Economics and an honorary full Professor at the Mathematics Division of the Institute for Basic Research, Florida, USA. He has vast experience of teaching and research. He is a Fellow of Pakistan Academy of Sciences, and Institute of Mathematics and its Applications (U K).

=== Arfa Abdul Karim Randhawa ===
Arfa Abdul Karim Randhawa was a Pakistani student and computer prodigy who, in 2004 at the age of nine, became the youngest Microsoft Certified Professional (MCP). She had her name in Guinness Book of World Records. She kept the title until 2008. Arfa represented Pakistan on various international forums including the TechEd Developers Conference. She also received the President's Award for Pride of Performance in 2005. A science park in Lahore, the Arfa Software Technology Park, was named after her. She was invited by Bill Gates to visit Microsoft Headquarters in the United States.

=== Dr. Naweed Syed ===
Dr. Naweed Syed is a Pakistani Canadian scientist. He is the first scientist to connect brain cells to a silicon chip.

=== Nergis Mavalvala ===
Nergis Mavalvala is a Pakistani-American astrophysicist known for her role in the first observation of gravitational waves. She was awarded a MacArthur Fellowship in 2010 and first Lahore technology reward from Information Technology University in 2017. Mavalvala is best known for her work on the detection of gravitational waves in the Laser Interferometer Gravitational-Wave Observatory (LIGO) project.

=== Muhammad Irfan-Maqsood ===
Muhammad Irfan-Maqsood is a Pakistani researcher and entrepreneur He is known for his work in the field of Techno-entrepreneurship and Biotechnology. He holds PhD in Cell and Molecular Biology and holding two MSc (Biotechnology) and MA (Political Sciences-IR). He has been awarded 4 time Iranian national techno-entrepreneurship award Sheikh Bahai by Minister of Science and Research, Iran and Young Entrepreneur from the Deputy Minister for Youth Affairs. His work has been acknowledged by almost all Iranian top news agencies, such as IRNA, ISNA, Daily Shargh, Asr-e-Iran, Donya-e-Eghtisad, IRIB News agency, Mehr News agency, Tasnim News agency etc. He is the only Pakistani and one of three non-Iranian who were enlisted as the most talented non-Iranian in Iran by the office of Vice president of Iran.

== Education expenditure as percentage of GDP ==
The expenditure on education is around 2% of Pakistan's GDP. However, in 2009 the government approved the new national education policy, which stipulates that education expenditure will be increased to 7% of GDP, an idea that was first suggested by the Punjab government.

The author of an article, the history of education spending in Pakistan since 1972, argues that this policy target raises a fundamental question: What extraordinary things are going to happen that would enable Pakistan to achieve within six years what it has been unable to lay a hand on in the past six decades? The policy document is blank on this question and does not discuss the assumptions that form the basis of this target. Calculations of the author show that during the past 37 years, the highest public expenditure on education was 2.80 percent of GDP in 1987–88. Public expenditure on education as a percentage of GDP was actually reduced in 16 years and maintained in 5 years between 1972–73 and 2008–09. Thus, out of total 37 years since 1972, public expenditure on education as a percentage of GDP either decreased or remained stagnant for 21 years. The author argues if linear trend were maintained since 1972, Pakistan could have touched 4 percent of GDP well before 2015. However, it is unlikely to happen because the levels of spending have had remained significantly unpredictable and unsteady in the past. Given this disappointing trajectory, increasing public expenditure on education to 7 percent of GDP would be nothing less than a miracle but it is not going to be of godly nature. Instead, it is going to be the one of political nature because it has to be "invented" by those who are at the helm of affairs. The author suggests that little success can be made unless Pakistan adopts an "unconventional" approach to education. That is to say, education sector should be treated as a special sector by immunizing budgetary allocations for it from fiscal stresses and political and economic instabilities. Allocations for education should not be affected by squeezed fiscal space or surge in military expenditure or debts. At the same time, there is a need to debate others options about how Pakistan can "invent" the miracle of raising education expenditure to 7 percent of GDP by 2015.

In Punjab, over 3,000 government school buildings have been declared structurally unsafe amid the 2025 monsoon season, putting students and teachers at serious risk. Despite repeated assessments, the Punjab School Education Department has failed to initiate timely repairs. Districts like Lahore, Faisalabad, Multan, and Rawalpindi report crumbling classrooms, exposed wiring, and collapsed roofs. The crisis reflects Pakistan's chronic underinvestment in education, with less than 2% of the national budget allocated to the sector among the lowest in the region leading to deteriorating infrastructure and poor learning environments.

== University rankings ==
In 2018, for first time NUST, Islamabad was ranked among top 100 QS Asia University rankings at 91. Also 7 universities of Pakistan were ranked among top 1000 QS Asia University rankings 2018. As of 2022, total 6 universities were ranked in top 1000: NUST (#358), Quaid-i-Azam University (#378), PIEAS (#398), LUMS (#651), UET, Lahore (#801), and University of the Punjab (#801).

== Religion and education ==
In Pakistan, the relationship between education and religion is complex and deeply intertwined, particularly in rural and impoverished areas. Due to chronic underfunding, inadequate infrastructure, and limited access to quality public education, many families turn to madrasas, or Islamic religious schools, which often provide free food, shelter, and religious instruction. While madrasas represent a small portion of the overall education system, their influence is significant, especially in regions where the state education system is failing. These schools typically focus on rote memorization of the Quran and have been associated with the spread of more militant interpretations of Islam. The Islamization of the national curriculum during the 1980s further embedded religious content in public education, shaping the broader educational landscape. Pervez Hoodbhoy, a prominent Pakistani physicist and education reform advocate, has criticized the government's longstanding neglect of the education sector, stating that the system has been effectively abandoned, allowing extremist influences to grow unchecked.

Scientific theories are also subject to resistance. For instance, one study of Pakistani science teachers showed that many rejected evolution based on religious grounds. However, most of the Pakistani teachers who responded to the study (14 out of 18) either accepted or considered the possibility of the evolution of living organisms, although nearly all Pakistani science teachers rejected human evolution because they believed that 'human beings did not evolve from monkeys.' This is a major misconception and incorrect interpretation of the science of evolution, but according to the study it is a common one among many Pakistani teachers. Although many of the teachers rejected the evolution of humans, " all agreed that there is 'no contradiction between science and Islam' in general".

Considering the State's long standing relationship with local and cross border terror groups, many foreign and domestic observers such as FATF and United Nations believe that the Madrasa education in Pakistan plays a crucial role in inciting Jihad among children which later becomes the foundation for terror outfits like Jaish-e-Mohammed and Lashkar-e-Taiba.

According to a Minority Rights Group International report published in 2002, in terms of literacy of religious minorities in Pakistan, the average literacy rate among Christians in Punjab is 34 per cent, Hindu (upper caste) is 34 per cent, Hindu (scheduled castes) is 19 per cent, others (including Parsis, Sikhs, Buddhists and nomads) is 17 per cent compared to the national average of 46.56 per cent. Whereas the Ahmadis have literacy rate slightly higher than the national average.

According to a 2024 report by the Institute for Monitoring Peace and Cultural Tolerance in School Education (IMPACT-se), school textbooks in Pakistan frequently depict Jews and Israel in a negative light, with Jews often portrayed using hostile stereotypes and accused of historical conspiracies. The report found that Judaism is largely excluded from religious education, the Holocaust is omitted, and Adolf Hitler is praised in at least one civics textbook for "restoring German pride" without reference to Nazi atrocities. The curriculum portrays Pakistan as a leader of the Muslim world in opposition to the West. Regional rivalries, particularly with India, are presented in absolute moral and religious terms, and jihad is often characterized as an armed and moral struggle. The overall educational content was found to marginalize minorities, reinforce traditional gender roles, and promote ideological narratives.

== Literacy rate ==
=== Literacy rate by Census ===
The definition of literacy has been undergoing changes, with the result that the literacy figure has vacillated irregularly during the various censuses. A summary is as follows:

| Year of census | Total | Male | Female | Urban | Rural | Definition of being "literate" | Age group |
|---|---|---|---|---|---|---|---|
| 1951 (West Pakistan) | 17.9% | 21.4% | 13.9% | N/A | N/A | One who can read a clear print in any language | All Ages |
| 1961 (West Pakistan) | 16.9% | 26.1% | 6.7% | 34.8% | 10.6% | One who is able to read with understanding a simple letter in any language | Age 5 and above |
| 1972 | 21.7% | 30.2% | 11.6% | 41.5% | 14.3% | One who is able to read and write in some language with understanding | Age 10 and Above |
| 1981 | 26.2% | 35.1% | 16.0% | 47.1% | 17.3% | One who can read newspaper and write a simple letter | Age 10 and Above |
| 1998 | 43.92% | 54.81% | 32.02% | 63.08% | 33.64% | One who can read a newspaper and write a simple letter, in any language | Age 10 and Above |
| 2023 | 60.65% | 68% | 52.84% | 74.09% | 51.56% | A person who can read a newspaper and write a simple letter in any language with understanding and can make simple calculation. | Age 10 and Above |

=== Literacy rate by Province ===
| Province | 2023 | | | | | 2017 | | | | | 1998 | | | 1981 | 1972 |
| Province | Total | Male | Female | Rural | Urban | Total | Male | Female | Rural | Urban | Total | Male | Female | Total | Total |
|---|---|---|---|---|---|---|---|---|---|---|---|---|---|---|---|
| Punjab | 66.25% | 71.98% | 60.19% | 58.37% | 77.30% | 64.01% | 71.17% | 56.67% | 56.23% | 76.65% | 46.56% | 57.20% | 35.10% | 27.4% | 20.7% |
| Sindh | 57.54% | 64.23% | 50.21% | 38.14% | 72.26% | 54.57% | 62.52% | 45.95% | 35.19% | 70.43% | 45.29% | 54.50% | 34.78% | 31.5% | 30.2% |
| Khyber Pakhtunkhwa | 51.09% | 64.57% | 37.15% | 48.35% | 65.55% | 54.02% | 69.23% | 38.72% | 50.79% | 67.14% | 35.41% | 51.39% | 34.03% | 16.7% | 15.5% |
| Balochistan | 42.01% | 50.50% | 32.80% | 35.74% | 55.86% | 43.58% | 54.15% | 31.89% | 36.99% | 59.57% | 26.6% | 18.82% | 14.09% | 10.3% | 10.1% |

=== Literacy rate of Federally Administered Areas ===
| Region | Literacy Rate | | | |
| Region | 1981 | 1998 | 2017 | 2023 |
|---|---|---|---|---|
| Islamabad (ICT) | 47.8% | 72.40% | | 83.97% |
| Azad Jammu & Kashmir (POK) | 25.7% | 55% | 74% | |
| Gilgit-Baltistan | 3% | 37.85% | | ... |

=== Districts with Literacy rate of 75% or above (2023 Census) ===
As of the 2023 Census, there are 14 districts within Pakistan which have literacy rates at 75% or above. These include 8 districts from northern and central Punjab, 4 from Sindh (all in Karachi), Abbottabad in Khyber Pakhtunkhwa and the capital city of Islamabad. 6 of these districts also have literacy rates above 80%.

| District | Province | Literacy rate |
|---|---|---|
| Islamabad | Islamabad Capital Territory | 83.97% |
| Karachi Central | Sindh | 83.55% |
| Rawalpindi | Punjab | 83.22% |
| Gujrat | Punjab | 81.37% |
| Jhelum | Punjab | 80.65% |
| Karachi East | Sindh | 80.07% |
| Korangi (Karachi) | Sindh | 79.86% |
| Lahore | Punjab | 79.62% |
| Karachi South | Sindh | 78.57% |
| Sialkot | Punjab | 78.37% |
| Chakwal | Punjab | 77.79% |
| Abbottabad | Khyber Pakhtunkhwa | 77.34% |
| Gujranwala | Punjab | 76.77% |
| Narowal | Punjab | 75.28% |

=== Districts with Youth Literacy rate (15-24) of 85% or above (2023 Census) ===
Moreover, 13 districts have Youth Literacy rates (15–24) of 85% or above according to the 2023 Census. These again include the same 8 districts from northern and central Punjab, along with 3 districts from Khyber Pakhtunkhwa, Karachi Central from Sindh, and the capital city of Islamabad. 6 of these districts also have literacy rates at or above 90%, with the highest being Upper Chitral at 95%.

| District | Province | Youth Literacy rate |
|---|---|---|
| Upper Chitral | Khyber Pakhtunkhwa | 95% |
| Abbottabad | Khyber Pakhtunkhwa | 92% |
| Gujrat | Punjab | 90.90% |
| Jhelum | Punjab | 90.63% |
| Rawalpindi | Punjab | 90.08% |
| Chakwal | Punjab | 90% |
| Narowal | Punjab | 89.44% |
| Sialkot | Punjab | 88.90% |
| Islamabad | Islamabad Capital Territory | 88.68% |
| Haripur | Khyber Pakhtunkhwa | 88% |
| Gujranwala | Punjab | 87% |
| Lahore | Punjab | 85.78% |
| Karachi Central | Sindh | 85.51% |

=== Mean Years of Schooling in Pakistan by administrative unit ===
| Unit | 1990 | 1995 | 2000 | 2005 | 2010 | 2012 | 2015 | 2018 |
|---|---|---|---|---|---|---|---|---|
| Azad Jammu & Kashmir | 3.78 | 4.59 ▲ | 5.42 ▲ | 7.47 ▲ | 7.22 ▼ | 7.35 ▼ | 6.92 ▼ | 6.51 ▼ |
| Balochistan | 1.77 | 2.15 ▲ | 2.53 ▲ | 3.49 ▲ | 3.25 ▼ | 3.14 ▼ | 3.17 ▼ | 3.10 ▼ |
| FATA | 1.42 | 1.73 ▲ | 2.04 ▲ | 2.81 ▲ | 2.71 ▼ | 2.69 ▼ | 2.60 ▼ | 2.45 ▼ |
| Gilgit-Baltistan | 2.01 | 2.44 ▲ | 2.88 ▲ | 3.97 ▲ | 3.84 ▼ | 3.80 ▼ | 4.59 ▲ | 5.17 ▲ |
| Islamabad (ICT) | 4.16 | 5.05 ▲ | 5.96 ▲ | 8.21 ▲ | 9.67 ▲ | 10.70 ▲ | 9.62 ▼ | 8.34 ▼ |
| Khyber Pakhtunkhwa | 1.83 | 2.22 ▲ | 2.62 ▲ | 3.62 ▲ | 3.80 ▲ | 3.97 ▲ | 3.95 ▼ | 3.82 ▼ |
| Punjab | 1.96 | 2.38 ▲ | 2.81 ▲ | 3.88 ▲ | 4.44 ▲ | 4.85 ▲ | 5.23 ▲ | 5.41 ▲ |
| Sindh | 2.43 | 2.95 ▲ | 3.48 ▲ | 4.79 ▲ | 5.19 ▲ | 5.51 ▲ | 5.35 ▼ | 5.05 ▼ |
| Pakistan | 2.28 | 2.77 ▲ | 3.27 ▲ | 4.51 ▲ | 4.68 ▲ | 4.85 ▲ | 5.09 ▲ | 5.16 ▲ |

== Literacy and development ==
Pakistan's literacy rate is lower than its neighbours in South Asia at 60.65 percent. The second lowest in South Asia after Afghanistan. Issues such as illiteracy are linked to poverty and lack of fulfilment of basic needs. Feudalism and patriarchist leadership has made it harder for people in rural areas to receive formal education, this is especially true for females.

There are several factors that contribute to the low levels of education in Pakistan, among the primary catalysts are lack of awareness, teachers' absenteeism, scarcity of quality educational institutions and insufficient government oversight of educational institutions.

A study published by the Research Journal of Commerce, Economics, and Social Sciences, discusses the importance of education. The study compares Indonesia, Malaysia and Pakistan. The study found that the literacy rate in Indonesia is 90%, in Malaysia it's 89% and in Pakistan it's 60.65%, which is significantly lower. In comparison to these two countries, Pakistan also has more poverty and inequality.

== International education ==
After the approval of the World Health Organization and the Ministry of Education of China, SICAS institutions have exemplified and classified Chinese universities where Pakistani students recognized by pmdc come to study in China through online methods As of January 2015, the International Schools Consultancy (ISC) listed Pakistan as having 439 international schools. ISC defines an 'international school' in the following terms "ISC includes an international school if the school delivers a curriculum to any combination of pre-school, primary or secondary students, wholly or partly in English outside an English-speaking country, or if a school in a country where English is one of the official languages, offers an English-medium curriculum other than the country's national curriculum and is international in its orientation." This definition is used by publications including The Economist.

== See also ==
- List of districts of Pakistan by Literacy rate
- List of special education institutions in Pakistan
- Lists of educational institutions in Pakistan
- Family planning in Pakistan
- Pakistan studies
- Pakistani textbooks controversy
- Right to Education Pakistan, an advocacy campaign
- Catholic Board of Education, Pakistan
- List of universities in Pakistan
