= Children Parliament Pakistan =

National organisation protecting children's rights

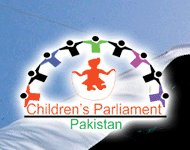
Children Parliament Pakistan Logo

The first ever children parliament of its kind was launched on November 14, 2008, by the Society for the Protection of the Rights of Child (SPARC) to raise awareness and promote child rights in Pakistan.

The members are elected from different schools of Islamabad, Peshawar, Faisalabad, Mithi, Kohlu, Balakot, Karachi, Lahore etc. All the members of the national assembly are elected for duration of one year at a time.

== Objectives ==
The basic objectives of the Children's Parliament of Pakistan (CPP) are to provide rights to every child in Pakistan and to:

- End child labor
- Educate every child
- Provide medical facilities to children
- Protect the children

In addition, the Children's Parliament serves as a voice for children to convey the problems and difficulties faced by the children of Pakistan to government.

== Members ==
=== Year 2008-2009 ===
Session 2008-2009 had 34 members some of which are:

- Bakht Jamshaid (Speaker Cpp and present SG)
- Muhammad Umar Iqbal (PM)
- Saad Bashir (Chairman)
- Komal Rizwan (Law Minister)
- Muhammad Abbas Khan Niazi (Health Minister)
- Mashal (Education Minister)
- Tallha Rizwan (Present PM)
- Bakhtawar Jabeen (Opposition Leader)
- Abbas Jamal
- Zain Abidiswkmk
- Ali Khalid
- Zainab
- Ibrahim Niazi
- Nelaish Kumar
- Syed Amna Zubia
- Pershant Sharma (Child labor minister)

=== Year 2010-2011 ===
- Muhammad Umar Saleem (MNA) party APP
- Shaikh Muhammad Hassan Ali (Minister of Anti-Narcotics) party APP
- Mahnoor Hassan (Opposition Leader) party PCAP
- Muhammad Saif Jamshed Baryar (Speaker) party APP
- Talha Bin Rizwan (Prime Minister) party APP
- Fahad Hafeez (Sports Minister) Independent
- Sharjeel Larik (Law Minister) party APP

៛ AAMIR ALI SILRO (DEPUTY SPEAKER, LARKANA SESSION 2010-2011)
