= Family planning in Pakistan =

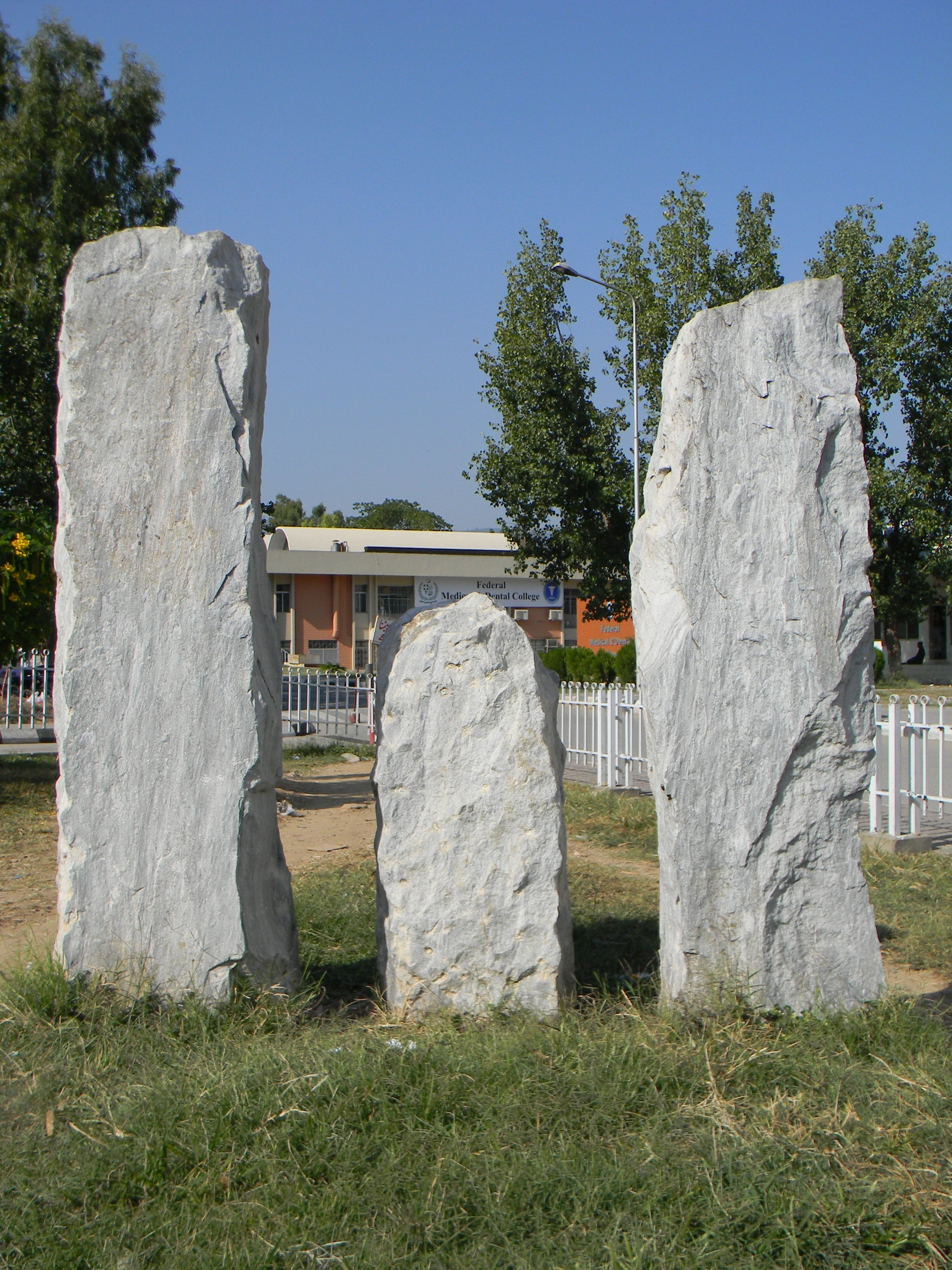
"Tabber", a stone monument at PIMS, Islamabad. The two taller stones represent parenthood while the smaller one represents a single child.

Even though there is considerable demand for family planning in Pakistan, the adoption of family planning has been hampered by government neglect, lack of services and misconceptions. Demographics play a large role in Pakistan's development and security since the change from military rule to civilian leadership. Challenges to Pakistani's well-being, opportunities for education and employment, and access to health care are escalated due to the country's continuously-growing population. It was estimated in 2005 that Pakistan's population totaled 151 million; a number which grows 1.9 percent annually, equaling a 2.9 million population growth per year. Though Pakistan's fertility rates still exceed those of neighboring South Asian countries with a total fertility rate at 4.1 (3.3 children in urban settings and 4.5 children in rural areas) and contraception use is lower than 35 percent, approximately one-fourth of Pakistani women wish to either delay the birth of their next child or end childbearing altogether.

According to Dr. Ansar Ali Khan, an advisor of reproductive health to the United Nations Population Fund in Pakistan, "A combination of factors like non-availability of services, baseless traditional beliefs and misconception play a big role." In addition, Ali Khan stated that "a fairly large number of the population believes the use of artificial contraceptives for family planning is against nature and also against Islam." Unlike family planning in Iran, a neighboring Islamic republic, Pakistan's family planning program has been touted to have failed in recent years due to neglect and constant policy changes as a result of political upheaval. (Note: Pakistan has more arable land than Iran which has more dry and mountainous territory, which is unsupportive for such a large scale of agricultural productivity. Like other species, human population growth depends on the amount of food availability in the area they inhabit. See carrying capacity.) While 96 percent of married women were reported to know about at least one method of contraception, only half of them had ever used it.

== History ==
In 1950, Pakistan's population reached 37 million people, making it the world's 13th most populous country. Though Pakistan was one of the first Asian countries to begin a family planning program with some help from international donors, fertility has declined slower than in neighboring countries. In 2007, Pakistan had increased in world population ranking to 6th, with over 164 million people and the United Nations (UN) has projected that in 2050 it will move into 5th place with around 292 million people.

=== Beginnings ===
The Family Planning Association of Pakistan (FPAP), now called "Rahnuma", was founded in Lahore by Saeeda Waheed in 1953. Waheed, a member of the All Pakistan Women's Association, began advocating for birth control when her maid died from an attempt to abort her own pregnancy. The FPAP was unsuccessful in changing family planning policies until President and military leader Ayub Khan took interest in the problem of overpopulation in the late 1950s. Khan spoke at the FPAP's first national seminar in 1959, speaking on the 'menace over overpopulation'. Soon after the seminar, the National Board of Family Planning was established as a policy-advising body for the federal government.

Pakistani journalist/researcher Ayesha Khan has suggested various reasons for Ayub Khan's position on population control. Firstly, religion played a minor role in his government, a position that would change with Pakistan's next leader. Secondly, development ideology during Khan's time of power warned of the economic risks of high population growth rates. Thirdly, it had political utility for a military leader with no popular mandate to his leadership and in need of a development strategy. Lastly, support from international donors.

=== Family planning policy in the 1960s ===
Pakistan's first Family Planning Scheme was a part of the country's Third Five Year Plan (1965–1970). This scheme became the template for all subsequent family planning strategies. The scheme's goal was to have a vast impact in the shortest time possible, with a reduction of the birth rate from 50 to 40 per 1000 by 1970. At the onset of the program, condoms were the most available method of contraception, but by 1966 the Intrauterine Device (IUD) had replaced it has the "corner-stone" of the Scheme. It was said to be "safe, cheap, reversible," and it required "little user action."

=== Family planning amid political turmoil ===
In 1969, Ayub Khan was overthrown by the joint action of Islamist parties and the leftist Pakistan People's Party. His successor Yahya Khan did little more than watch as a civil war ripped apart East and West Pakistan in 1971. Wajihuddin Ahmed, the Family Planning Commissioner during Yahya Khan's rule, focused on reducing pregnancies in women "rather than meeting contraceptive targets alone" and introducing the pill to Pakistani women.

In 1971, while the country was split apart and international assistance halted due to army atrocities in Bangladesh, the Pakistan Peoples Party took power of the Pakistani government. Its leader, Zulfiqar Ali Bhutto, needed to gain legitimacy and popularity by taking an anti-American, anti-capitalist, and anti-Ayub Khan-stance. However, Bhutto found that he could not fund many of his socialist promises, and so allowed economic assistance from USAID. Over the 15-year span of 1964-1979, USAID "spent over $30 million on Pakistan's population programme; during 1965–75 US AID provided 40% of total programme inputs." However, due to extreme and unrealistic goals, the USAID program was highly ineffective.

In 1977 Bhutto's Chief of Army Staff, General Zia ul-Haq, deposed the leader and declared martial law. Zia differed from his predecessors in that he "made the religious-right-wing his political ideology." He had used the religious lobbies and conservative middle-classes as support for his take-over. In a move looking to counter Bhutto's government and as a gesture to his religious constituency, Zia froze the existing family planning program and banned publicity for family planning activities. Zia enforced strict laws against adultery (punishable by death), rape, intoxication, and theft. USAID funding was suspended, and Pakistan became alienated "from the Western powers that Ayub Khan had so carefully cultivated."

Near the end of Zia's era of power, family planning and population control became tied to the Ministry of Health (Pakistan). Unfortunately, the program has remained fairly unchanged over the past 35 years due to implementation problems involving over-centralization, lack of coordination, and structural flaws.

== Rural and Urban Healthcare Disparities That Contribute to Pakistan's High Child Mortality Rate ==
One of Pakistan's largest problems is its rapidly expanding population and their limited access to necessary essentials such as readily available healthcare, doctor's, and basic sexual education. Although the nation has recently been making active efforts to adhere to the United Nations Millennium Development Goals that aims to reduce global infant mortality by two-thirds, their efforts have fallen short as a large population of the Islamic Republic of Pakistan resides in rural areas where the nation's efforts have rarely been seen. The accompanying concerns of this crisis have resulted in extremely high neonatal, infant and child mortality rates. According to the UN Inter-agency Group for Child Mortality Estimation, Pakistan's rates of child mortality (neonatal mortality rate: 44.2; infant mortality rate: 61.2; child under 5 mortality rate: 74.9) nearly double the worldwide average (neonatal mortality rate: 18; infant mortality rate: 29.4; child under 5 mortality rate: 39.1) set by UNICEF Global.

== Religious influences ==
Muslim populations are incredibly diverse, varying by race, language, and degree of religious conservatism. Some populations are part of countries run by Islamic law, while others live under secular governments. In Pakistan, extremely conservative Islamic beliefs predominate in many parts of the country, in which purdah restricts women to their homes unless chaperoned by a male relative. Additionally, levels of schooling are very low in Pakistan, allowing men to have more power in decision-making.

When Ayub Khan resigned in 1969, religious demonstrators attempted to discredit the leader morally using the slogan "Family planning, for those who want free sex!" This ideology is still present in Pakistan, as the organized religious party opposes family planning because it is un-Islamic. Though Pakistani couples commonly cite religious reasons for avoiding birth control, there is not one definitive agreement about family planning and contraception in Islam. In Pakistan, many local religious figures are supportive of family planning and have begun discussions in their communities in order to promote the health of women and children.

Although many public health specialists feel that religion plays a major role in resistance to the use of FP in Pakistan, the Pakistan Demographic and Health Survey of 2006-7 showed that religious reasons accounted for only 9% of FP non-use. In fact, many NGOs have implemented interventions where they have worked with local or national clergy. Islamabad based think tank Research and Development Solutions reports that there is no quantitative evidence that any of these interventions have resulted in an increase in CPR in these communities.

== Current contraceptive use ==
Historically, political strife and cultural restrictions on women constraining their empowerment have hampered implementation of family planning strategies throughout the country. Most women who say they do not want any more children or would like to wait a period of time before their next pregnancy do not have the contraceptive resources available to them in order to do so. One-fourth of married women are estimated to have an unmet need. In the 1990s, women increasingly reported to wanting fewer children, and 24 percent of recent births were reported to be unwanted or mistimed. The rate of unwanted pregnancies is higher for women living in poor or rural environments; this is especially important since two-thirds of women live in rural areas. While only 22 percent of pregnant married women report being currently using a modern method of birth control and 8 percent reported to be using a traditional method, lack of widespread contraceptive use could be due to the lack breadth of the current family planning program. The most commonly reported reasons for married women electing not to use family planning methods include the belief that fertility should be determined by God (28 percent); opposition to use by the woman, her husband, others or a perceived religious prohibition (23 percent); infertility (15 percent); and concerns about health, side effects or the cost of family planning (12 percent).

The first abortion penal code (Article 312) of this region dates back to 1860, during British colonial rule which stipulated that unless an abortion was to "save a woman's life," it was expressly illegal and punishable by law, and the same applied for (self)induced miscarriages. In 1990, the penal code was provisionally adapted in order to better reflect Islamic Law, and finally was made permanent in 1997. According to this change in the abortion law, preservation of "the physical and mental health" of a woman, early on in the pregnancy, also became legal grounds for a permissible abortion. However, the interpretation of necessary treatment required by a woman for an abortion to be performed is vague, and despite the legality, health professionals in Pakistan felt abortion was "immoral, contrary to religion and illegal," especially according to female paramedics when compared to doctors and gynaecologists. However, the female paramedics had a more lenient attitude when it came to a question of whether an abortion was justified: to save a mother's life, when the fetus was either abnormal or when a woman was raped; whereas the gynaecologists and doctors felt it was less permissible to perform, especially in the case of rapes. Healthcare professionals do not wish to perform abortions either due to their own religious leanings, ethical stances or fear of stigmatization.

When a comparison of the private sector and public sector was made with regards to abortion and post-abortion care provided, it was noted that the private sector performed more abortions and took on double the case-load of post-abortion care, as opposed to the public sector. Therefore, it currently plays an important role in the provision of care of patients undergoing abortions. Due to a lack of access (especially in the rural areas), no clarity (dearth of awareness, understanding and education), fear of legal persecution (especially in the public sector), an inability of health care professionals to interpret the law, as well as a form of FP, women are often forced to seek abortion by untrained providers. According to an indirect estimation method, applied to the 2002 national data on abortions and its related complications in Pakistan, 1 in every 7 pregnancy terminates in an abortion.

Extending beyond the reach of family planning and contraceptive methods is the issue of women's sexual and reproductive health. According to the World Health Organization and Population Action International, as of 2007, "only 16 percent of women receive at least four antenatal care visits during pregnancy, fewer than one-third of births are attended by skilled health personnel, and the maternal mortality ratio, at 320 maternal deaths per 100,000 live births, remains high."

== Current policy ==
Dating from 2002, Pakistan's current family planning policy reflects the government's concern with rising population trends and poverty. The policy's goals include reducing population growth (from 2.1 percent in 2002 to 1.3 by 2020), reducing fertility through voluntary family planning (from 4 births per woman in 2004 to 2.1 births per woman by 2020), and as a signatory to the Programme of Action developed at the International Conference on Population and Development in Cairo in 1994, Pakistan pledged to provide universal access to family planning by 2010. Also in Pakistan's Poverty Reduction Strategy Paper is the objective of increasing contraceptive use 57 percent by 2012. At present there is no federal ministry of health or population welfare and therefore no, population policy. However, at the time of writing, Khyber Pakhtunkhwa, Sindh and Punjab are working on individual Health and Population strategies. An analysis of this policy showed that while the Government of Pakistan spent US$652 million funds under this policy between 2000 and 2009 (UNFPA), there was hardly any change in CPR which was 30% in 2000 and remained unchanged in 2006. It is also important to note that other elements of population development such as education, capacity building, economic development, climate etc. were notably absent from this policy.

In 2009 the Ministry of Population sought to revise the Population Policy. However, under the 18th Amendment to the Constitution, the Ministry was devolved and its responsibilities were shifted to Provincial Population Welfare Departments. In 2013 some of the provinces – notably Punjab – reported that they were developing their own population policies.

== Family planning in 2000s ==
In 2006–07, the Pakistan Demographic Health Survey of Pakistan (PDHS 2006-7) showed that approximately 30% of married women of reproductive age (MWRA) were using some form of Family Planning. Of these 8% used a traditional and 22% used a modern method. Approximately 25% had an unmet for Family Planning, of this around 2/3rd was for limiting and the rest for spacing. These translate into 7 million FP (Family Planning) users, 5 million users of modern methods and 6 million with an unmet need. Since a large number of modern method users are sterilized and received the service in a previous year, the actual number women availing any FP service were just under 3 million or less than half of those with an unmet need. The DHS also dispelled the popular notion that religious reasons keep families from using family planning. In the DHS less than 10% of FP nonusers cited a religious reason for their non-use.

Using data from the PDHS 2006-7, approximately 35% of FP users received their FP services from the public sector, 12% from NGOs and private providers and the overwhelming 52% bought their methods over the counter from shops, making FP services largely subject to market forces. The government spends on average around Rs. 4 billion (US$42 million) a year on FP but nearly 90% of this goes towards salaries and overheads and commodities account for 7-14% of these funds. Since the PDHS 2006-7, operations of NGOs have increased but it appears that according to the supply data there has been no increase in supply of FP commodities and that entry of the NGO Marie Stopes Society into FP services has displaced clients from other private sector, perhaps those that previously self procured commodities. Additionally, it appears that the if the amount of commodities that are being reported by the Pakistan Bureau of Statistics in its "Annual Contraceptive Prevalence Reports" is accurate, the overall increase in population may mean that the CPR for modern methods may have actually declined. Even when one adjusts for underreporting for private sector and NGO services, it is likely that the current CPR may actually be unchanged from the PDHS 2006-7. A more accurate picture will emerge with the release of the data from the Pakistan Demographic and Health Survey 2012.

== Family planning after 2010 ==
A brief version of the Pakistan Demographic and Health Survey 2012 was released in October 2013. It showed that the overall CPR had climbed to 33.4% of which approximately 25% was from modern methods. In essence it showed that the overall increase in CPR since the previous DHS had been around 1% per annum overall and around 0.5% in modern methods. Extrapolating these results to estimated populations suggest that there are 8.8 million users of any FP, 5.5 million users of modern methods and 3.65 million women who avail FP services in any given year. Thus only around 14% of all married women of reproductive age (MWRA) access FP services in a given year. This represents an increase of 700,000 users since the last DHS; around 2/3 of this difference may be attributed to increased population and nearly all these were supplied by NGOs.

The preliminary DHS report does not report sources of FP services but analysis of government's contraceptive prevalence report suggests that 44% avail public sector services and that the role of NGOs has increased from 11% in 2006-7 to around 40%. The total change in users of FP services between 2006 and 2012 was around 700,000 women. This is exactly equal to the increase in number of women served by NGOs (supported by donors such as USAID, DFID, KfW, GIZ, David and Lucile Packard Foundation etc.); while the overall quantum services by the Government and those that self procure commodities from stores remained the same.

== Community Health Workers ==
In the 1990s, two agencies in Pakistan started village-based community health worker programs in Pakistan. The Ministry of Population Welfare started planning a program in 1992 based on a similar program in Bangladesh. This program recruited married women, with at least 10 years of schooling, that lived in rural areas, and trained them to provide family planning services to their communities. The aim of these services was to reduce the fertility rate and slow population growth. The Ministry of Health (Pakistan) started a similar program in 1994 called "lady health workers." This program emphasized maternal and child health, and also delivered family planning services. Both groups of women provide door to door health and family planning services, supplied with oral and injectable contraceptives and condoms to distribute to their communities. One study in 2002 showed that in areas with 2 or more community-based workers there was a 7% increase in the use of modern, reversible contraceptive methods. An evaluation of the lady health worker program showed only a marginal improvement in FP among health indicators the populations served of around 5-6%. In 2006 there were 96,000 lady health workers.

== See also ==
- Human population planning
