= List of Red Cross and Red Crescent societies =

The International Red Cross and Red Crescent Movement, the world's largest group of non-governmental organizations working on humanitarian aid, is composed of the following bodies:

- The International Committee of the Red Cross (ICRC), is an independent, neutral organization ensuring humanitarian protection and assistance for victims of armed conflict and other situations of violence. It takes action in response to emergencies and at the same time promotes respect for international humanitarian law and its implementation in national law. It is based in Geneva, Switzerland.
- The International Federation of Red Cross and Red Crescent Societies (IFRC), is an international membership organization that unites 191 Red Cross and Red Crescent Societies and supports them through a global secretariat. The IFRC acts before, during and after disasters and health emergencies to meet the needs and improve the lives of vulnerable people. It is also based in Geneva, Switzerland.
- The 191 individual National Societies of the ′International Federation of Red Cross and Red Crescent Societies′, which despite the name includes the Red Star of David Society in Israel.

== Members of the International Federation of Red Cross and Red Crescent Societies (IFRC) ==
The data of the members of International Federation of Red Cross and Red Crescent Societies can be found on the Federation-wide Databank and Reporting System (FDRS). It provides data insights on the world's largest humanitarian network of Red Cross and Red Crescent Societies around the world.

IFRC members Red Cross Society Red Crescent Society Red Star of David Society (Red Crystal outside of Israel) Non-members Red Cross Society Red Crescent Society

Society	Native name	Founding date	Website
(Afghanistan) Afghan Red Crescent Society	Pashto: د افغاني سرې میاشتې ټولنې; Persian: جمعیت هلال احمر افغانی	1934	
(Albania) Albanian Red Cross	Albanian: Kryqi i Kuq Shqiptar	4 October 1921	
(Algeria) Algerian Red Crescent	Arabic: الهلال الأحمر الجزائري	1957	
American Red Cross		21 May 1881	
(Andorra) Andorran Red Cross	Catalan: Creu Roja Andorrana	24 March 1994	
Angola Red Cross	Portuguese: Cruz Vermelha de Angola	1978	
Antigua and Barbuda Red Cross		20 October 1983	
(Argentina) Argentine Red Cross	Spanish: Cruz Roja Argentina	9 June 1880	
(Armenia) Armenian Red Cross Society	Armenian: Հայկական Կարմիր խաչի ընկերությունն	19 March 1920	
Red Cross Aruba	Dutch: Rode Kruis Aruba; Papiamento: Cruz Cora Aruba	31 October 1957	
(Australia) Australian Red Cross		28 June 1941	
(Austria) Austrian Red Cross	German: Österreichisches Rotes Kreuz	14 March 1880	
Azerbaijan Red Crescent Society	Azerbaijani: Azərbaycan Qızıl Aypara Cəmiyyət	10 March 1920	
Bahamas Red Cross		1939	
Bahrain Red Crescent Society	Arabic: جمعية الهلال الأحمر البحريني	1971	
Bangladesh Red Crescent Society	Bengali: বাংলাদেশ রেড ক্রিসেন্ট সোসাইটি	16 December 1971	
Barbados Red Cross		24 July 1969	
(Belgium) Belgian Red Cross	Dutch: Belgische Rode Kruis; French: Croix-Rouge de Belgique; German: Belgisches Rotes Kreuz	4 February 1864	
Belize Red Cross Society		1950	
Red Cross of Benin	French: Croix-Rouge béninoise	1963	
Bhutan Red Cross Society	Dzongkha: འབྲུག་ཉེན་སྒྲོལ་སྡེ་ཚོགས།	8 May 2017	
(Bolivia) Bolivian Red Cross	Spanish: Cruz Roja Boliviana	15 May 1917	
Red Cross Society of Bosnia and Herzegovina	Bosnian: Društvo Crvenog krsta Bosne i Hercegovine; Serbian: Друштво Цервеног крста Босне и Херцеговине; Croatian: Društvo Crvenog križa Bosne i Hercegovine	7 November 2001	
Botswana Red Cross Society		1968	
(Brazil) Brazilian Red Cross	Portuguese: Cruz Vermelha Brasileira	5 December 1908	
British Red Cross	Welsh: Y Groes Goch Brydeinig	4 August 1870	
Brunei Darussalam Red Crescent Society	Malay: Persatuan Bulan Sabit Merah Negara Brunei Darussalam, Jawa: ڤرساتوان بولن سابيت ميره نݢارا بروني دارالسلام	1997	
(Bulgaria) Bulgarian Red Cross	Bulgarian: Български червен кръст	20 September 1885	
(Burkina Faso) Burkinabe Red Cross Society	French: Croix-Rouge burkinabè	31 July 1961	
Burundi Red Cross	French: Croix-Rouge du Burundi	1963	
(Cambodia) Cambodian Red Cross	Khmer: កាកបាទក្រហមកម្ពុជា	18 February 1955	
Cameroon Red Cross Society	French: Croix-Rouge camerounaise	30 April 1960	
(Canada) Canadian Red Cross	French: Croix-Rouge canadienne	4 October 1921	
Red Cross of Cape Verde	Portuguese: Cruz Vermelha de Cabo Verde	1984	
(Central African Republic) Central African Red Cross Society	French: Croix-Rouge centrafricaine	1966	
Red Cross of Chad	Arabic: الصليب الأحمر التشادي; French: Croix-Rouge du Tchad	1983	
(Chile) Chilean Red Cross	Spanish: Cruz Roja Chilena	18 December 1903	
Red Cross Society of China	Chinese: 中国红十字会	1950	
(Colombia) Colombian Red Cross	Spanish: Cruz Roja Colombiana	30 July 1915	
(Comoros) Comorian Red Crescent	French: Croissant-Rouge comorien Arabic: الهلال الأحمر القمري	1982	
Red Cross of the Democratic Republic of the Congo	French: Croix-Rouge de la République Démocratique du Congo; Swahili: Msalaba Mwekundu la Jamhuri ya Kidemokrasi ya Kongo	4 January 1924	
Congolese Red Cross	French: Croix-Rouge congolaise		
Cook Islands Red Cross Society			
(Costa Rica) Costa Rican Red Cross	Spanish: Cruz Roja Costarricense	4 April 1885	
Red Cross Society of Côte d'Ivoire	French: Croix-Rouge de Côte d’Ivoire		
(Croatia) Croatian Red Cross	Croatian: Hrvatski Crveni križ	1878	
(Cuba) Cuban Red Cross	Spanish: Cruz Roja Cubana	1909	
Cyprus Red Cross	Greek: Κυπριακός Ερυθρός Σταυρός; Turkish: Kıbrıs Kızılhaç	1950	
(Czech Republic) Czech Red Cross	Czech: Český červený kříž	5 June 1993	
(Denmark) Danish Red Cross	Danish: Dansk Røde Kors	26 April 1876	
(Djibouti) Djiboutian Red Crescent	French: Croissant-Rouge de Djibouti; Arabic: الهلال الأحمر الجيبوتي	1 August 1977	
Dominica Red Cross		1981	
(Dominican Republic) Dominican Red Cross	Spanish: Cruz Roja Dominicana	1927	
East Timor Red Cross	Portuguese: Cruz Vermelha de Timor-Leste	2000	
(Ecuador) Ecuadorian Red Cross	Spanish: Cruz Roja Ecuatoriana	22 April 1910	
(Egypt) Egyptian Red Crescent	Arabic: الهلال الأحمر المصري	1911	
(El Salvador) Salvadorian Red Cross	Spanish: Cruz Roja Salvadoreña	13 March 1885	
Red Cross of Equatorial Guinea	Spanish: Cruz Roja de Guinea Ecuatorial; French: Croix-Rouge de Guinée équatoriale Portuguese: Cruz Vermelha da Guiné Equatorial		
(Estonia) Estonian Red Cross	Estonian: Eesti Punane Rist	24 February 1919	
Eswatini Red Cross		26 April 1876	
(Ethiopia) Ethiopian Red Cross Society	Amharic: የኢትዮጵያ ቀይ መስቀል ማኅበር	8 July 1935	
Fiji Red Cross Society		1972	
(Finland) Finnish Red Cross	Finnish: Suomen Punainen Risti; Swedish: Finlands Röda Kors	7 May 1877	
(France) French Red Cross	French: Croix-Rouge française	25 May 1864	
(Gabon) Gabonese Red Cross	French: Croix-Rouge gabonaise		
Gambia Red Cross Society		1966	
(Georgia (country)) Georgian Red Cross	Georgian: საქართველოს წითელი ჯვრი	1918	
(Germany) German Red Cross	German: Deutsches Rotes Kreuz	25 January 1921	
Ghana Red Cross Society		1958	
Grenada Red Cross		August 1987	
(Guatemala) Guatemalan Red Cross	Spanish: Cruz Roja Guatemalteca	22 April 1923	
(Guinea) Guinean Red Cross	French: Croix-Rouge guinéenne	1984	
Red Cross of Guinea-Bissau	Portuguese: Cruz Vermelha da Guiné-Bissau		
Guyana Red Cross Society			
(Haiti) Haitian Red Cross	French: Croix-Rouge haïtienne Haitian Creole: Kwa Wouj Ayisyen	29 May 1932	
Hellenic Red Cross	Greek: Ελληνικός Ερυθρός Σταυρός	10 June 1877	
(Honduras) Honduran Red Cross	Spanish: Cruz Roja Hondureña	24 September 1937	
Hong Kong Red Cross	Chinese: 香港紅十字會	12 July 1950	
(Hungary) Hungarian Red Cross	Hungarian: Magyar Vöröskereszt	1881	
(Iceland) Icelandic Red Cross	Icelandic: Rauði kross Íslands	10 December 1924	
(India) Indian Red Cross Society	Hindi: भारतीय रेड क्रॉस सोसायटी	1920	
(Indonesia) Indonesian Red Cross Society	Indonesian: Palang Merah Indonesia	17 September 1945	
(Iran) Iranian Red Crescent Society	Persian: جمعیت هلال احمر جمهوری اسلامی ایران	1922	
(Iraq) Iraqi Red Crescent Society	Arabic: جمعية الهلال الأحمر العراقي; Kurdish: مانگی سووری عێراق	1932	
Irish Red Cross	Irish: Crois Dhearg na hÉireann	6 July 1939	
(Italy) Italian Red Cross	Italian: Croce Rossa Italiana	15 June 1864	
Jamaica Red Cross		8 April 1948	
(Japan) Japanese Red Cross Society	Japanese: 日本赤十字社	1 May 1877	
Jordan Red Crescent	Arabic: الهلال الأحمر الأردني	1950	
(Kazakhstan) Kazakh Red Crescent	Kazakh: Қазақстанның Қызыл Айы / Qazaqstannyñ Qyzyl Аiy; Russian: Красный Полумесяц Казахстана	5 March 1937	
Kenya Red Cross	Swahili: Msalaba Mwekundu la Kenya	1965	
Kiribati Red Cross Society		1965	
Red Cross Society of the Democratic People's Republic of Korea	Korean: 조선민주주의인민공화국 적십자회	18 October 1946	
Korean Red Cross	Korean: 대한적십자사	27 October 1905	
Kuwait Red Crescent Society	Arabic: جمعية الهلال الأحمر الكويت	10 January 1966	
Kyrgyzstan Red Crescent	Kyrgyz: Кыргызстан Кызыл Ай; Russian: Красный Полумесяц Кыргызстана	1936	
(Laos) Lao Red Cross	Lao: ອົງການກາແດງແຫ່ງຊາດລາວ	1955	
(Latvia) Latvian Red Cross	Latvian: Latvijas Sarkanais Krusts	20 November 1918	
(Lebanon) Lebanese Red Cross	Arabic: الصليب الأحمر اللبناني	9 July 1945	
Lesotho Red Cross Society	Sotho: Mokhatlo oa Sefapano se Sefubelu sa Lesotho	9 November 1967	
(Liberia) Liberian Red Cross Society		January 1919	
(Libya) Libyan Red Crescent	Arabic: الهلال الأحمر الليبي	5 October 1957	
Liechtenstein Red Cross	German: Liechtensteinisches Rotes Kreuz	30 April 1945	
(Lithuania) Lithuanian Red Cross	Lithuanian: Lietuvos Raudonasis Kryžius	1919	
Luxembourg Red Cross	French: Croix-Rouge luxembourgeoise German: Luxemburgisches Rotes Kreuz; Luxembourgish: Lëtzebuerger Rout Kräiz	1914	
Macau Red Cross	Chinese: 澳門紅十字會; Portuguese: Cruz Vermelha de Macau	1943	
(Madagascar) Malagasy Red Cross	Malagasy: Vokovoko Mena Malagasy; French: Croix-Rouge malagasy	7 August 1963	
Magen David Adom	Hebrew: מגן דוד אדום	7 June 1930	
Malawi Red Cross Society		1966	
(Malaysia) Malaysian Red Crescent	Malay: Bulan Sabit Merah Malaysia	1957	
(Maldives) Maldivian Red Crescent	Dhivehi: ދިވެހި ރެޑް ކްރެސެންޓް	16 August 2009	
Mali Red Cross	French: Croix-Rouge malienne	1965	
Malta Red Cross Society	Maltese: Soċjetà Maltija tas-Salib l-Aħmar	30 April 1945	
Marshall Islands Red Cross Society		26 November 2013	
(Mauritania) Mauritanian Red Crescent	Arabic: الهلال الأحمر الموريتاني	1970	
Mauritius Red Cross	French: Croix-Rouge de Maurice		
(Mexico) Mexican Red Cross	Spanish: Cruz Roja Mexicana	21 February 1910	
Micronesia Red Cross Society			
(Moldova) Moldovan Red Cross Society	Romanian: Societatea de Cruce Roșie din Moldova	21 February 1910	
Red Cross of Monaco	French: Croix-Rouge monégasque	1948	
(Mongolia) Mongolian Red Cross Society	Mongolian: Монголын улаан загалмай нийгэмлэг	1939	
Red Cross of Montenegro	Montenegrin: Crveni krst Crne Gore; Montenegrin Cyrillic: Црвени крст Црне Горе	1875	
(Morocco) Moroccan Red Crescent	Arabic: الهلال الأحمر المغربي; French: Croissant-Rouge marocain	1957	
Mozambique Red Cross	Portuguese: Cruz Vermelha de Moçambique	21 February 1910	
Myanmar Red Cross Society	Burmese: မြန်မာနိုင်ငံ ကြက်ခြေနီ အသင်း	1 April 1937	
Namibia Red Cross Society	Afrikaans: Namibiese Rooi Kruis	1992	
Nepal Red Cross Society	Nepali: नेपाल रेडक्रस सोसाइटी	1963	
Netherlands Red Cross	Dutch: Nederlandse Rode Kruis	1867	
New Zealand Red Cross	Māori: Rīpeka Whero Aotearoa	1911	
Red Cross Society of Niger	French: Croix-Rouge nigérienne	1963	
(Nigeria) Nigerian Red Cross		1960	
Red Cross of North Macedonia	Macedonian: Црвен крст на Северна Македонија; Albanian: Kryqi i Kuq i Maqedonisë së Veriut	17 March 1945	
(Norway) Norwegian Red Cross	Norwegian: Norges Røde Kors; Nynorsk: Noregs Raude Kross	22 September 1865	
Pakistan Red Crescent	Urdu: ہلالِ احمر پاکستان	20 December 1947	
Palau Red Cross Society		1977	
Palestine Red Crescent Society	Arabic: جمعية الهلال الأحمر الفلسطيني	1968	
(Panama) Panamanian Red Cross	Spanish: Cruz Roja Panameña	1917	
Papua New Guinea Red Cross		1977	
(Paraguay) Paraguayan Red Cross	Spanish: Cruz Roja Paraguaya		
(Philippines) Philippine Red Cross	Tagalog: Krus na Pula ng Pilipinas	1947	
(Poland) Polish Red Cross	Polish: Polski Czerwony Krzyż	18 January 1919	
(Portugal) Portuguese Red Cross	Portuguese: Cruz Vermelha Portuguesa	11 February 1865	
Qatar Red Crescent	Arabic: الهلال الأحمر القطري	1978	
(Romania) Romanian Red Cross	Romanian: Crucea Roșie Română	4 July 1876	
(Russia) Russian Red Cross	Russian: Российский Красный Крест	15 May 1867	
(Rwanda) Rwandan Red Cross	French: Croix-Rouge rwandaise	1962	
Saint Kitts and Nevis Red Cross		1942	
Saint Lucia Red Cross		1949	
Saint Vincent and the Grenadines Red Cross			
Samoa Red Cross Society	Samoan: Koluse Mumu o Sāmoa	1952	
(San Marino) Sammarinese Red Cross	Italian: Croce Rossa Sammarinese	1949	
São Tomé and Príncipe Red Cross	Portuguese: Cruz Vermelha de São Tomé e Príncipe	1976	
(Saudi Arabia) Saudi Red Crescent Authority	Arabic: هيئة الهلال الأحمر السعودي	1934	
(Senegal) Senegalese Red Cross	French: Croix-Rouge sénégalaise	1962	
Red Cross of Serbia	Serbian: Црвени крст Србије / Crveni krst Srbije	6 February 1876	
Red Cross Society of Seychelles	French: Croix-Rouge des Seychelles		
Sierra Leone Red Cross Society		1962	
Singapore Red Cross Society	Chinese: 新加坡红十字会; Malay: Persatuan Palang Merah Singapura; Tamil: சிங்கப்பூர் செஞ்சிலுவை சங்கம்	30 September 1949	
(Slovakia) Slovak Red Cross	Slovak: Slovenský Červený kríž	8 December 1992	
(Slovenia) Slovenian Red Cross	Slovene: Rdeči križ Slovenije	8 June 1944	
Solomon Islands Red Cross			
(Somalia) Somali Red Crescent Society	Somali: Ururka Bisha Cas ee Soomaaliyeed; Arabic: جمعية الهلال الأحمر الصومالي	1963	
(South Africa) South African Red Cross Society	Afrikaans: Suid-Afrikaanse Rooi Kruisvereniging	1921	
South Sudan Red Cross	English: South Sudan Red Cross Society (SSRC)	9 March 2012	
(Spain) Spanish Red Cross	Spanish: Cruz Roja Española; Catalan: Creu Roja Espanyola; Galician: Cruz Vermella Española; Basque: Espainiako Gurutze Gorria	6 July 1864	
Sri Lanka Red Cross Society	Sinhala: ශ්‍රී ලංකා රතු කුරුස සමාජය; Tamil: இலங்கை செஞ்சிலுவை சங்கம்	1936	
(Sudan) Sudanese Red Crescent	Arabic: الهلال الاحمر السوداني	1923	
Suriname Red Cross	Dutch: Surinaamse Rode Kruis		
(Sweden) Swedish Red Cross	Swedish: Svenska Röda Korset	1865	
(Switzerland) Swiss Red Cross	German: Schweizerisches Rotes Kreuz; French: Croix-Rouge suisse Italian: Croce Rossa Svizzera; Romansh: Crusch Cotschna Svizra	1866	
(Syria) Syrian Arab Red Crescent	Arabic: الهلال الأحمر العربي السوري	1942	
Tajikistan Red Crescent	Tajik: Ҳилоли Аҳмари Тоҷикистон; Russian: Красный Полумесяц Таджикистана		
Tanzania Red Cross Society	Swahili: Shirika la Msalaba Mwekundu Tanzania	1962	
(Thailand) Thai Red Cross Society	Thai: สภากาชาดไทย	26 April 1893	
(Togo) Togolese Red Cross	French: Croix-Rouge togolaise	1959	
Tonga Red Cross Society		1961	
Trinidad and Tobago Red Cross Society		12 July 1939	
(Tunisia) Tunisian Red Crescent	Arabic: الهلال الأحمر التونسي	1956	
(Turkey) Turkish Red Crescent	Turkish: Türk Kızılay	1868	
National Red Crescent Society of Turkmenistan	Turkmen: Türkmenistanyň Gyzyl Ýarymaý Milli Jemgyýeti	1926	
Tuvalu Red Cross Society			
Uganda Red Cross Society	Swahili: Shirika la Msalaba Mwekundu nchini Uganda	1964	
(Ukraine) Ukrainian Red Cross Society	Ukrainian: Товариство Червоного Хреста України	18 April 1918	
Red Crescent Society of the United Arab Emirates	Arabic: الهلال الأحمر الإماراتي	1983	
(Uruguay) Uruguayan Red Cross	Spanish: Cruz Roja Uruguaya	5 March 1897	
Uzbekistan Red Crescent Society	Uzbek: O‘zbekiston Qizil Yarim Oy Jamiyati / Ўзбекистон Қизил Ярим Ой Жамияти	14 November 1925	
Vanuatu Red Cross Society		1992	
(Venezuela) Venezuelan Red Cross Society	Spanish: Sociedad Venezolana de la Cruz Roja	1895	
(Vietnam) Viet Nam Red Cross Society	Vietnamese: Hội Chữ thập đỏ Việt Nam	23 November 1946	
Yemen Red Crescent Society	Arabic: جمعية الهلال الأحمر اليمني	1968	
Zambia Red Cross Society		1966	
Zimbabwe Red Cross Society		1981	

== States which currently do not have National Societies that are active members of the IFRC ==
=== National Society is not a member of the International Red Cross and Red Crescent Movement ===
- Eritrea: Eritrean Red Cross is not a member of IFRC, lacking official recognition from the state government
- Faroe Islands: Faroe Islands Red Cross
- Indonesia: Indonesian Red Crescent Society, in competition with the Indonesian Red Cross Society (as a sectarian religious body it is ineligible for recognition)
- Kosovo: Red Cross of Kosovo
- Northern Cyprus: North Cyprus Red Crescent Society (observer)
- Rojava: Kurdish Red Crescent (only states are authorized to use Red Crescent or the Red Cross symbols)
- Sahrawi Arab Democratic Republic: Sahrawi Red Crescent (observer)
- Taiwan (Republic of China):
  - Red Cross Society of the Republic of China (previously recognized by the ICRC, but not a member or observer of the Federation)
  - Red Swastika Society (as a sectarian religious body it is ineligible for recognition)

=== IFRC membership suspended ===
- Belarus: Belarus Red Cross (IFRC membership suspended on December 1, 2023)
- Peru: Peruvian Red Cross, its IFRC membership was suspended on August 12, 2022

=== States which have no National Society at all ===
Nauru, Niue, Oman, and the Vatican City are the states without national societies, along with the states with limited recognition, such as Abkhazia, Somaliland, South Ossetia, Transnistria.

Nicaragua's National Society, Nicaraguan Red Cross, was dissolved by Nicaragua's parliament on May 9, 2023.

== Former members of the International Federation of Red Cross and Red Crescent Societies (IFRC) ==
=== Former members which are now subdivisions ===
The German Red Cross (DRK) was founded in 1921, bringing together various independent Red Cross associations that had previously operated autonomously within the German states. These regional branches trace their origins back to the former independent members of the International Federation of Red Cross and Red Crescent Societies. Examples include the Badisches Rotes Kreuz, Bayerisches Rotes Kreuz, and the regional associations of Bremen, Hamburg, Oldenburg, Hesse, and Berlin. Some current subdivisions are direct continuations of these earlier organizations, while others resulted from mergers or divisions of the former members.

== See also ==
- International Red Cross and Red Crescent Movement
- International Federation of Red Cross and Red Crescent Societies
- International Committee of the Red Cross
- Sovereign Military Order of Malta
- Black Cross Nurses
- International Blue Cross
- Green Cross International
- German Green Cross, Austrian Black Cross, Black Cross Christian Delegate Aid
