= Standing Commission of the Red Cross and Red Crescent =

The Standing Commission of the Red Cross and Red Crescent
- Formation: 1928
- Type: Deliberative body
- Legal status: Active
- Headquarters: Geneva, Switzerland
- Fields: Humanitarianism
- Chair: Mercedes Babé
- Website: www.standcom.ch

The Standing Commission of the Red Cross and Red Crescent is the permanent statutory body of the International Red Cross and Red Crescent Movement and the highest deliberative body of the Movement between the meetings of the Council of Delegates and the International Conference of the Red Cross and Red Crescent. It was originally set up to coordinate cooperation between the International Committee of the Red Cross and the International Federation of Red Cross and Red Crescent Societies (previously known as the League of Red Cross Societies).

It consists of two representatives from the ICRC (including its president), two from the IFRC (including its president), and five individuals who are elected by the International Conference. There is also a permanent administrative Secretariat currently located at the ICRC Headquarters in Geneva, Switzerland. There have been 65 previous elected members of the Standing Commission, in addition to the 5 members who are currently serving. The Standing Commission is also responsible for giving out the Henry Dunant Medal (the Movement's highest award) and the Red Cross Red Crescent Prize for Peace and Humanity.

== History ==
The Standing Commission of the Red Cross and Red Crescent is the permanent statutory body of the Red Cross and Red Crescent Movement and the highest deliberative body of the Movement between the meetings of the Council of Delegates and the International Conference, as well as the trustee of the International Conference of the Red Cross and Red Crescent. It was created during the 13th Red Cross Conference in The Hague, the Netherlands in 1928, under Article 18, resolution X. It was set up, in part, to be a connecting force between the International Committee of the Red Cross and the League (today the International Federation of Red Cross and Red Crescent Societies), as there had been some disputes over how the Movement should be run and what level of autonomy the League should have. After years of disagreement, Colonel Paul Draudt who was vice-chairman of the League and Max Huber of the ICRC drafted a plan that formed the basis for the adoption of the “Statutes of the International Red Cross” in 1928. This resulted in the League being recognised as a full component of the Movement and helped build institutional stability and effectiveness. In order to help with this cooperation a new International Council was approved- which was the direct predecessor of the Standing Commission. Since then, the Standing Commission has been making arrangements for the International Conference (held every four years) such as setting the place and date, establishing the programme, preparing the provisional agenda for submission to the Council of Delegates as well as promoting the Conference, encouraging members of the Conference to make pledges and securing optimum attendance. It has also encouraged implementation of resolutions, examined issues of concern for the Movement and worked to promote cooperation and coordination within the different branches of the Movement.

== Role and Mandate ==
The Standing Commission's main role is to act as the trustee of the International Conference of the Red Cross and Red Crescent. The International Conference is the highest institutional body of the Movement and every four years members from the ICRC, IFRC, the National Societies as well as states and other relevant international actors meet to discuss humanitarian matters. In between the Conferences, the Standing Commission acts as the supreme body and is mandated to provide strategic guidance to all the components of the Movement, along with supervising the implementation of and compliance with the resolutions made during the International Conference. Its functions and goals are defined in article 18 of the Statutes of the Movement and have been further developed in the Council of Delegates (CoD) and International Conference resolutions.

In addition to its responsibilities regarding arrangements for International Conferences and meetings of the council, the Standing Commission is responsible for

- cooperation and coordination within the Movement;
- making sure the resolutions from the International Conference are being implemented and followed.

Another purpose (in consultation with the ICRC, the International Federation of Red Cross and Red Crescent Societies and National Societies) is to provide strategic guidance in matters which concern the Movement as a whole. It prepares Movement-wide policies such as the Strategy for the Movement, which aims at coordination and cohesion in action. It is the only body in the Movement where all components are represented and which meets regularly on a permanent basis. For the implementation of its decisions, the Commission relies on the ICRC, the International Federation, and the National Societies as components of the Movement. In preparing Councils of Delegates and International Conferences, the Commission focuses on the inclusion of and consultation with National Societies, in order to try to stay in touch with local needs and with external developments. The Standing Commission was also instrumental in bringing the Seville Agreement to the Council of Delegates for adoption to better regulate more cooperation between different components of the Movement. The Standing Commission convenes at least twice a year.

== Membership ==
The Standing Commission has nine members, five elected from national societies but serving in a personal capacity; two from the International Committee of the Red Cross (one of whom serves as president); and two from the International Federation of the Red Cross and the Red Crescent Societies (IFRC). There is also a permanent administrative Secretariat located at the ICRC Headquarters in Geneva, Switzerland.

Previous and current elected members of the Standing Commission

Number	Name	National Society	Gender	Period
1	Pierre Nolf	Belgian Red Cross	Male	1930–34
2	Prince Tokugawa	Japanese Red Cross	Male	1930–38
3	Lady Novar	British Red Cross	Female	1930–34
4	Torolf Prytz	Norwegian Red Cross	Male	1930–34
5	Marquis de Hoyos	Spanish Red Cross	Male	1930–34
6	General D. Ricardo Burguete y Lana	Spanish Red Cross	Male	1934–38
7	Dr Ibrahim Refik Saydam Bey	Turkish Red Crescent Society	Male	1934–38
8	Alvaro Carlos Tourinho	Brazilian Red Cross	Male	1934–38
9	Sir Arthur Stanley	British Red Cross	Male	1934–46
10	Axel Hultkranz	Swedish Red Cross	Male	1938–48
11	Dr Chao Phya Bijayanati	Thai Red Cross	Male	1938–48
12	Dr Pedro Vignau	Argentinian Red Cross	Male	1938–48
13	Senator Giuseppe de Michelis	Italian Red Cross	Male	1938–48
14	Count Folke Bernadotte	Swedish Red Cross	Male	1946–48
15	André François-Ponçet	French Red Cross	Male	1948–65
16	Tom Willmott Sloper	Brazilian Red Cross	Male	1948–65
17	Ali Rana Tarhan	Turkish Red Crescent	Male	1948–52
18	Henrik Beer	Swedish Red Cross	Male	1949–51
19	Lord Woolton	British Red Cross	Male	1952–57
20	Boris Pachkov	Russian Red Cross	Male	1952–57
21	James Thomas Nicholson	American Red Cross	Male	1951–57
22	Rajkumari Amrit Kaur	Indian Red Cross	Female	1952–57
23	General Alfred Maximilian Gruenther	American Red Cross	Male	1957–65
24	Prof Georgy Miterev	Russian Red Cross	Male	1957–73
25	Angela Countess of Limerick	British Red Cross	Female	1965–73
26	General F. Collins	American Red Cross	Male	1965–73
27	Hans (Ritter von) Lauda	Austrian Red Cross	Male	1965–69
28	Sir Geoffrey Newman-Morris	Australian Red Cross	Male	1965–77
29	Dr Ahmed Djebli-Elaydouni	Moroccan Red Crescent	Male	1969–73
30	Dr Nadejda Troyan	Russian Red Cross	Female	1973–77
31	George Aitken	Canadian Red Cross	Male	1973–77
32	Alexandra Issa-el-Khoury	Lebanese Red Cross	Female	1973–77
33	Sir Evelyn Shuckburgh	British Red Cross	Male	1973–81
34	Dr Kai Warras	Finnish Red Cross	Male	1977–86
35	HE Dr Ahmed Abu-Goura	Jordan National Red Crescent	Male	1977–81
36	OMR Prof Dr Werner Ludwig	German Red Cross	Male	1977–81
37	Rito Alcantara	Senegalese Red Cross	Male	1977–81
38	R. James Kane	Canadian Red Cross	Male	1981–86
39	Soehanda Ijas	Indonesian Red Cross	Male	1981–95
40	Dr Janos Hantos	Hungarian Red Cross	Male	1981–95
41	Hon Byron Hove	Zimbabwe Red Cross	Male	1986–99
42	Dr Botho Prinz su Sayn Wittgenstein-Hohenstein	German Red Cross	Male	1986–95
43	Mavy Harmon	Brazilian Red Cross	Female	1986–95
44	Véronique Ahouanmenou	Red Cross of Benin	Female	1993–95
45	Guillermo Rueda Montaña	Colombian Red Cross	Male	1995–99
46	Princess Christina Magnuson	Swedish Red Cross	Female	1995–03
47	Princess Margriet	Netherlands Red Cross	Female	1995–03
48	Tadateru Konoe	Japanese Red Cross	Male	1995–03
49	General Georges Hanouk	Lebanese Red Cross	Male	1998–99
50	Prof Mamoun Yousif Hamid	The Sudanese Red Crescent	Male	1999–99
51	Dr Abdul-Rahman Al-Swailam	Saudi Red Crescent Authority	Male	1999–03
52	Dr Freddy Karup Pedersen	Danish Red Cross	Male	2003–07
53	Janet M. Davidson	Canadian Red Cross	Female	2003–07
54	Philippe Cuvillier	French Red Cross	Male	2003–07
55	Zoy Katevas de Sclabos	Chilean Red Cross	Female	2003–07
56	Adama Diarra	Mali Red Cross	Male	2007–11
57	Eamon Harrison Courtenay	Belize Red Cross	Male	2007–11
58	Greg Vickery	Australian Red Cross	Male	2011–2019
59	Steven E. Carr	American Red Cross	Male	2007–2015
60	H.E. Dr Mohammed Al-Hadid	Jordan National Red Crescent Society	Male	1999–2015
61	Dr Massimo Barra	Italian Red Cross	Male	2007–2019
62	Hon. Pär Stenback	Finnish Red Cross	Male	2011–2015
63	Eva von Oelreich	Swedish Red Cross	Female	2015–2017
64	Chrystold Chetty	Red Cross Society of Seychelles	Male	2015–2019
65	George Weber	Canadian Red Cross Society	Male	2015-
66	Ibrahim Osman	The Sudanese Red Crescent	Male	2017–2019
67	Mercedes Babé	Spanish Red Cross	Female	2019-
68	Abbas Gullet	Kenya Red Cross Society	Male	2019-
69	Dr Hilal Al Sayer	Kuwait Red Crescent Society	Male	2019-
70	Fine Tu'itupou Arnold	Cook Islands Red Cross Society	Female	2019-

== The Henry Dunant Medal ==
The Henry Dunant Medal is the highest award of the Red Cross Movement and is presented and awarded by the Standing Commission of the Red Cross and Red Crescent. The Standing Commission makes up to five awards every two years. The medal is awarded in order to “recognise and reward outstanding services and acts of great devotion, mainly of international significance, to the cause of the Red Cross/Red Crescent by any of its members.” Special weight is put on the international significance of a potential recipient's acts or service. The medal was first given in 1969 and 149 individuals have received the award since then.

== Red Cross Red Crescent Prize for Peace and Humanity ==
The Standing Commission is also responsible for awarding the Red Cross and Red Crescent Prize for Peace and Humanity. It was created in 1987 and is given either to National Societies or to persons in the Movement “who have actively contributed to a more peaceful world through humanitarian action and the dissemination of the ideals of the Movement”. Only four recipients have received it so far, the Lebanese Red Cross in 1989, the Somali Red Crescent in 1993, the Syrian Arab Red Crescent in 2013, and Dr Mohammed Al-Hadid of the Jordan National Red Crescent Society in 2019.

== Related links ==
- http://www.icrc.org/eng/
- http://www.ifrc.org/en/
- http://www.ifrc.org/en/who-we-are/directory/web-pages/
- http://www.rcrcconference.org/en
- http://www.standcom.ch/
