= First Aid Convention Europe =

First Aid competition

The First Aid Convention in Europe (FACE) brings together around 1,000 participants from 30 countries each year in order to find out the most efficient team in a First Aid competition. The teams come from the different National Red Cross and Red Crescent Societies in each country. Each team consists of six people.

== Competitions ==
- 2016 Slovenian Red Cross (Website). Winner: Serbia, 2nd: Ireland, 3rd: Montenegro
- 2015 Romanian Red Cross (Website). Winner: Slovenija, 2nd: Serbia, 3rd: Ireland
- 2013 Austrian Red Cross (Website). Winner: Bulgaria, 2nd: Ireland, 3rd: Slovenija
- 2012 Irish Red Cross. Winner: Italy, 2nd: Austria, 3rd: Armenia
- 2011 Italian Red Cross (Website). Winner: Serbia, 2nd: Serbia, 3rd: Ireland
- 2010 Serbian Red Cross (Website) Winner: Great Britain, 2nd: Slovenija, 3rd: Ireland
- 2009 German Red Cross (Website). Winner: Serbia, 2nd: Ireland, 3rd: Italy
- 2008 British Red Cross, Liverpool. (Website). Winner: Serbia, 2nd: Ireland, 3rd: Armenia
- 2007 Irish Red Cross. Winner: Serbia, 2nd: Bulgaria, 3rd: Austria
- 2006 Italian Red Cross. Winner: Serbia, 2nd: Ireland, 3rd: Armenia
- 2005 Slovak Red Cross. Winner: Austria, 2nd: Ireland, 3rd: Austria
- 2004 Austrian Red Cross. Winner: Armenia, 2nd: Belgium, 3rd: Germany
- 2003 Czech Red Cross. Winner: Switzerland, 2nd: Great Britain, 3rd: Belgium
- 2002 Belgian Red Cross. Winner: Ireland
- 2000 Swiss Red Cross. Winner: Ireland
- 1999 Austrian Red Cross. Winner: Ireland
- 1998 Italian Red Cross. Winner: Italy
- 1997 French Red Cross. Winner: Great Britain
- 1996 Hungarian Red Cross. Winner: Ireland
- 1995 Norwegian Red Cross. Winner: Ireland
- 1994 British Red Cross. Winner: Great Britain
- 1993 Austrian Red Cross. Winner: Great Britain
- 1992 Swedish Red Cross. Winner: Austria
- 1991 Swiss Red Cross. Winner: Great Britain
- 1990 German Red Cross. Winner: Germany
- 1989 Netherlands Red Cross. Winner: Austria
- 1988 Finnish Red Cross. Winner: Finland
- 1987 German Red Cross. Winner: Netherlands
