= Red Cross Sint Maarten =

Red Cross St Maarten
- Founded: 19 May 1976
- Type: Aid agency, Non-profit organisation
- Purpose: Humanitarian aid
- Location: Sint Maarten
- President: Nadia Chirlias
- General Manager: Vacant
- Parent organization: The Netherlands Red Cross
- Website: redcross.sx

Red Cross Sint Maarten is the Red Cross national society of Sint Maarten, a constituent country of the Kingdom of the Netherlands. While technically it is an overseas branch of the Netherlands Red Cross it is registered as an independent entity under Sint Maarten law, auxiliary to the Government of Sint Maarten. Its mission is to prevent and alleviate human suffering wherever it occurs, increasing the self-sufficiency of the communities of Sint Maarten, and ensuring that there is respect and willingness to help in the society. In the aftermath of Hurricane Irma it played an important role in helping the affected people in the country.

== Activities ==
=== Response to Hurricane Irma ===
Following the devastating impacts of category 5 Hurricane Irma on the 6th of September 2017, the Netherlands Red Cross has raised 19 million euros in the Netherlands for response and recovery. They began organising relief efforts via Red Cross St Maarten, focusing on food and water distribution as well as the distribution of non-food items. A team of approximately 70 people (volunteers and staff) has coordinated Red Cross efforts in the areas of WASH, Restoring Family Links, health, shelter, food, mapping of the most vulnerable areas and conducting assessments. Early recovery focused on cash-based assistance, roof repair and school meal projects. Long term recovery projects currently focus on safe and healthy living, economic security, disaster risk reduction and response preparedness.

=== Regular activities ===
Apart from disaster recovery, the organisation works with training people in first aid, providing first aid at events, collecting and re-distributing second-hand clothes through clothes drives, and fundraising for local and regional emergencies. There is also a building in Belvedere district called the Red Cross Senior Citizens Home, however it is not managed by Red Cross Sint Maarten.

== Locations ==
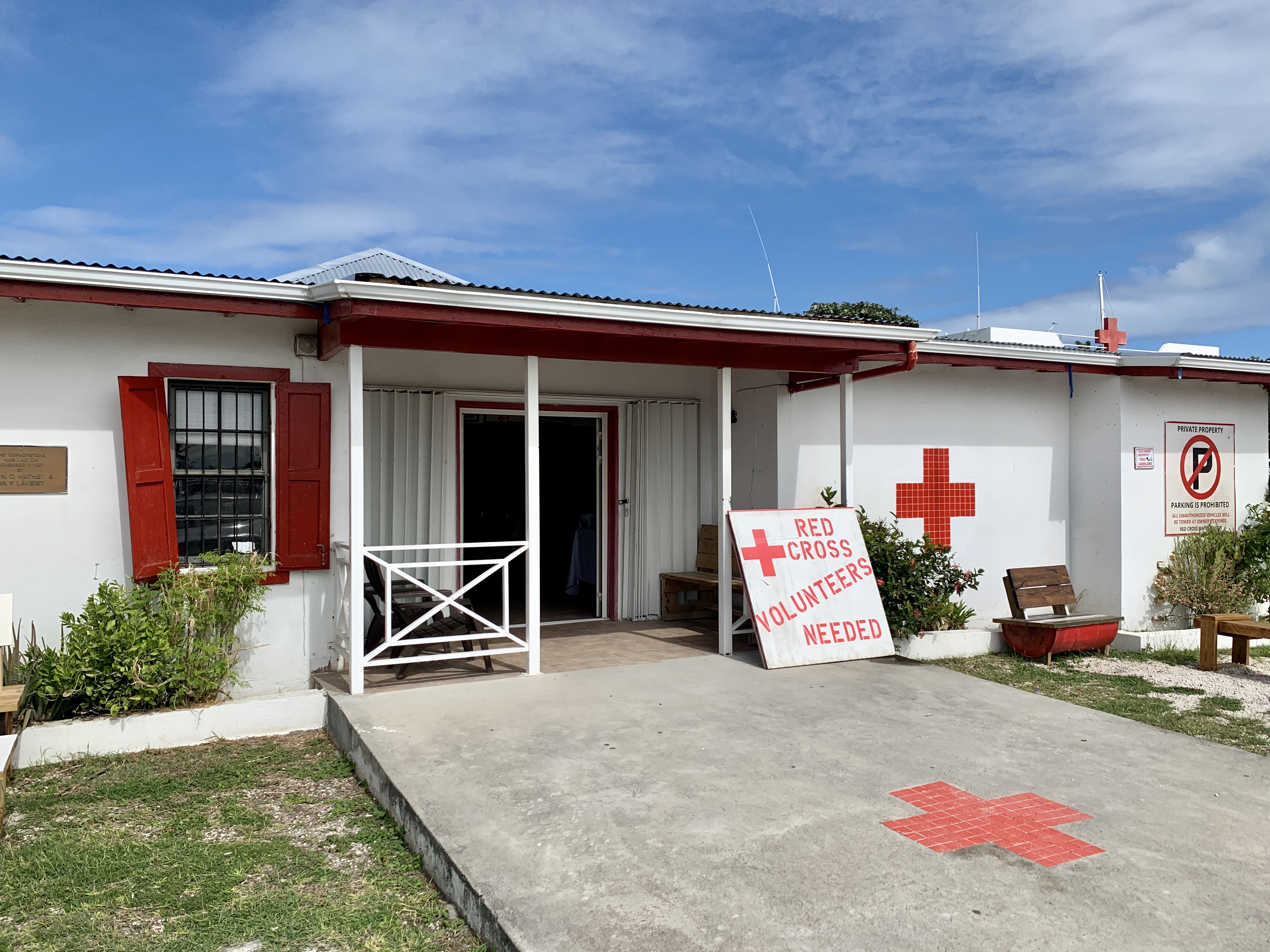
The main office of Red Cross St Maarten on Airport Road, Simpson Bay

The main office of Red Cross St Maarten is located on Airport Road along the runway of Princess Juliana International Airport. In June 2019 the organisation opened a service point in Philipsburg to provide information on ongoing and upcoming Red Cross projects.

== Criticism ==
In the first weeks after Hurricane Irma some were accusing Red Cross St Maarten for an inadequate and slow response. A Dutch marine was quoted complaining that the military had to distribute their own rations and water because the Red Cross was not providing supplies. According to his account, the marines' primary objective of keeping order on the island was hindered by having to do aid work at the same time.

After Red Cross St Maarten had distributed food vouchers to people, some residents questioned their impartiality by implying that only "a certain few" had received vouchers, whereas people in need were excluded. They claimed that this was a result of a lack of coordination and poor organisation on the Red Cross's part.

== See also ==
- List of Red Cross and Red Crescent Societies

The son of president Nadia chirials of the Red Cross is Noawha Hyman
