= Rosemary Museminali =

Rwandan politician and diplomat

The Honourable Rosemary Museminali

Minister of Foreign Affairs and Cooperation
- In office September 2, 2005 – December 4, 2009
- President: Paul Kagame
- Preceded by: Protais Mitali
- Succeeded by: Louise Mushikiwabo

Personal details
- Born: 1962 (age 63–64) Uganda
- Party: Rwandan Patriotic Front

Rosemary Museminali (born 1962) is a Rwandan politician and diplomat, currently working for the Joint United Nations Programme on HIV/AIDS (UNAIDS), as its representative at the African Union and United Nations Economic Commission for Africa. Museminali is best known for her role as the Rwandan Minister of Foreign Affairs and Cooperation from 2005 until 2009. She has also served as the country's Minister of State for International Cooperation and as ambassador to the United Kingdom.

== Early life ==
Rosemary Museminali was born in 1962 in Uganda, to Rwandan born refugee parents, who had fled the country following the 1959 Rwandan Revolution, which saw the creation of a republic dominated by the majority Hutu, and persecution of the minority Tutsi. Museminali grew up and completed her education in Uganda, earning a degree in social work and administration from Makerere University in 1986. While still in Uganda, Museminali worked as an Administration Manager for Nyanza Textile Industries Limited.

In the 1990s, a rebel army led by Paul Kagame, also a refugee in Uganda, launched a four-year civil war which culminated in the 1994 Rwandan genocide, in which between 500,000 and 1,000,000 Tutsi and politically moderate Hutu were killed by Hutu extremists. The war was ended when Kagame's forces took over the whole country, enabling thousands of Tutsi exiles, including Museminali, to return to their homeland.

== Political and diplomatic career ==
After her arrival in Rwanda, Museminali began working in the Ministry of Social Welfare, assisting other refugees trying to return to the country and attempting to reunite families torn apart by the genocide. She remained with the ministry for five years, before moving to work as Secretary General of the Rwandan Red Cross, a role she held for only a brief period. In 2000, Museminali was appointed ambassador for Rwanda to the United Kingdom, including additional roles as ambassador to Ireland and the Scandinavian countries. She remained in this position, based in London, for five years.

On her return to Rwanda in 2005, Museminali was appointed by President Paul Kagame to the role of junior minister at the Ministry of Foreign Affairs (MINAFFET), responsible for international cooperation. She was promoted in March 2008 to the position of foreign minister, in overall charge of the ministry. During her time as foreign minister, she prioritised the maintenance of peace and security in Rwanda, as well as pushing to build peace internationally. As part of the latter aim, she oversaw Rwanda's involvement in the United Nations–African Union Mission in Darfur. She also worked internationally to develop Rwanda's economy. In December 2009, President Kagame sacked Museminali, replacing her with Minister of Information Louise Mushikiwabo in a reshuffle. Museminali was not offered another position in the government.

Some time after leaving the government, Museminali moved to Addis Ababa to work for the Joint United Nations Programme on HIV/AIDS (UNAIDS), as its representative to both the African Union and the United Nations Economic Commission for Africa. She remains in this role as of 2016.
