= SLRC =

SLRC may refer to:

- San Luis Río Colorado, a city in Sonora, Mexico
- Saint Lucia Red Cross, a Society founded in 1949 as part of the British Red Cross, and created as an independent agency in 1983
- Sierra Leone Red Cross Society, a Sierra Leone society, based in Freetown
- Southern Legal Resource Center, a nonprofit legal center in the US state of South Carolina
- Sri Lanka Rifle Corps, a reserve regiment of the Sri Lanka Army
- Sri Lanka Rupavahini Corporation, the national television system of Sri Lanka
