= Life-Saving Plaque =

Civil medal of the Czech Republic

Life-Saving Plaque Plaketa Za záchranu života
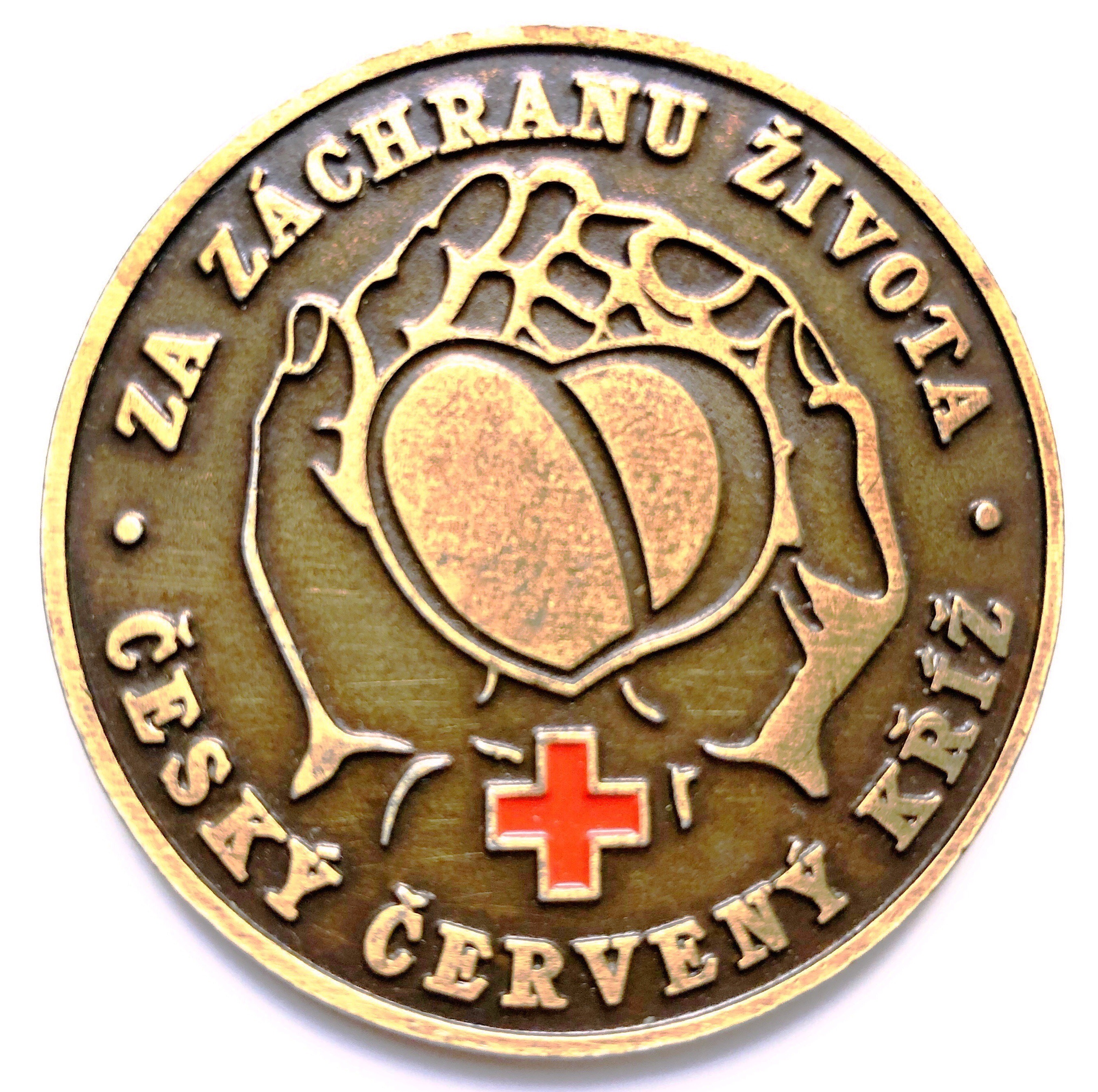
- Country: Czech Republic
- Presented by: Czech Red Cross
- Status: Currently awarded
- Established: 1983

The Life-Saving Plaque is an award given since 1983 by the executive board of the Czechoslovak Red Cross and later the Czech Red Cross.

== Eligibility ==
It is awarded to lay rescuers "for the expression of personal bravery and determination expressed in personal intervention leading to the provision of first aid to fellow citizens immediately endangered." Every citizen of the Czech Republic can be nominated for the award. The award is presented once a year at a ceremonial gathering in significant places in Prague.

=== Award criteria ===
- the provision of first aid, which has been shown to save lives
- rescue of endangered persons, during which the life of the rescuer occurred or could have been endangered
- providing personal assistance in case of drowning, in case of risk of freezing
- in cases deserving special attention, which may be equivalent to life-saving measures

== Holders ==
=== 2021 ===
The award was not given.

=== 2020 ===
The award was not given.

=== 2019 (Žofín Palace) ===
- Lukáš Kozel
- Metoděj Renza
- Ivan Valenta
- Jaromír Korčák and Štěpán Burgr
- Vít Penka and Matěj Šindelář

=== 2018 (Wallenstein Palace – Main Hall) ===
- Jiří Kopal

=== 2017 (Wallenstein Palace – Main Hall) ===
- Pavla Henzlová
- Jitka Křížová

=== 2016 (Wallenstein Palace – Main Hall) ===
- Karel Janderka

=== 2015 (Wallenstein Palace – The Plenary Session Hall) ===
- Matyáš Pocklan
- Lukáš Sagalinec

=== 2014 (Wallenstein Palace – The Plenary Session Hall) ===
- Ondřej Machoň
