= Rwandan Red Cross =

Humanitarian organization

- Founded: 1962
- Type: Non-profit organisation
- Purpose: Humanitarian Aid
- Location: Rwanda
- Affiliations: International Committee of the Red Cross; International Federation of Red Cross and Red Crescent Societies

The Rwandan Red Cross, also known as the, RRC, was established in July 1962 in Kigali, Rwanda.

On October 8, 1982, Rwanda became the 130th member of the International Committee of the Red Cross (ICRC). One year later, Rwanda became a member of the International Federation of the Red Cross on October 8, 1983. During the 1994 Rwandan Genocide, the Rwandan Red Cross measures were halted due to ethnic tensions and political instability. In 1995, the Rwandan Red Cross was able to continue its efforts with help from other Red Cross movements.

A youth council was established in 2008. This is a significant change to the structure of the Rwandan Red Cross as it has youths on various levels including, initiatives, education, implementation, and decision-making processes on both the large and small scale.

== Mission ==
The Rwandan Red Cross maintains that it is dedicated to aiding individuals and society through organized and collective efforts while ensuring that all persons and communities are treated equally despite various intersectional differences including but not limited to race, gender, political beliefs, religious identity, sexual orientation, etc. The Rwandan Red Cross has 10 mission values that include harm reduction, harm preemptions, aid and assistance that transcends beliefs and conflict, attempts to ensure International Humanitarian Law, education, disaster response and preparedness, and cooperation with international and internal organizations to ensure fulfillment of duties.

=== Code of Conduct ===
The Code of Conduct that was written by the ICRC and to be followed by the ICRC, other Red Cross Federations, and other types of humanitarian and non-governmental organizations was established after the Rwandan Genocide in 1994. It is supposed to serve as a guide of conduct for disaster relief. Its intentions are to mitigate bias amongst other types of aid and governmental organizations and to ensure equal, effective, and high standards that all parties are to be held to during times of disaster response.

== Notable Members ==
=== Philippe Gaillard ===
While the Rwandan Red Cross halted its mission in 1994, Philippe Gaillard was the head of the International Committee of the Red Cross that was stationed in Rwanda. In a documentary called, The Ghosts of Rwanda, about his time there during the genocide, it was noted that very few international organizations remained in place to provide aid assistance during this crisis. Gaillard and his team remained. In an interview with Gaillard, it was estimated that around 65,000 lives were saved due to the assistance provided by the ICRC. This intervention is significant because it allowed for the continuation of Red Cross assistance despite the RRC's measures being halted. This resulted in a positive response regarding the Red Cross and the eventual continuation of the RRC.

== Responses and Initiatives ==
=== Role in the 1994 Rwandan Genocide ===
The Rwandan Genocide of 1994 greatly impacted the Rwandan Red Cross, thus halting its activities and resuming in 1995.

==== War Surgery ====
The ICRC developed a surgical hospital with one team in Kigali, Rwanda allowed for 596 patients with war-related injuries to receive immediate medical care onsite. Of the 596 patients, 95% needed treatment due to war-related injuries. The surgeons and other physicians were able to provide necessary care for patients in crisis despite limited resources. They developed and utilized techniques that would allow for singular treatment plans due to a lack of resources and capacity. However, they were able to successfully utilize these techniques to provide effective treatment and care given constraints.

==== Family Reunification ====
One of the largest RRC efforts was family reunification. While the RRC was not the sole member of this operation, they had assistance from the ICRC, IFRC, United Nations High Commissioner for Refugees, and the United Nations Children's Fund (UNICEF). The ICRC was tasked with control of the operation. With combined international and local efforts, they created a program that was meant to track children and families in an attempt to reunite them. The software program was called Standard 4 and it was developed store and manage data. The qualifications that were used included any child under the age of 18 who had been separated and the acknowledgment of non-Western familial structures outside of a two parent household, which means that children could be united with other members of their family. They also developed three phases of categorization of migration and displacement: Phase 1: April 1994-August 1995, Phase 2: September 1995-October 1996, and Phase 3: November 1996-December 1997. This allowed for children to be systematically registered to increase their likelihood of finding their families.

It is estimated that 47,000 children were reunited with their families during January 1995 and June 1996. In November 1996, 28,000 children were registered into a database in order to keep track. In 1998, 85% of these children were reunited with a member of their family. The rest of the children that had not yet been reunited were part of a photo tracing effort with UNICEF to create broader outreach in helping them find their families. This effort was successful, around 42% of the children part of the photo tracing efforts were reunited with family. It also estimated that 4.6 million messages were shared via the Red Cross during this time.

=== Aids Epidemic ===
The Norwegian Red Cross was responsible for funding the Rwandan Red Cross AIDS education program in July 1986. The education program consisted of radio and other programs that were broadcast daily for one hour for six months. The Rwandan Red Cross conducted a survey and found that the efficacy of the program was significant and that citizens knew what AIDS was through the broadcasting outlets. In addition to this, the Rwandan Red Cross released thousands of informational pamphlets to broaden its educational outreach. A study found that the RRC interventions and education awareness destigmatized conversations regarding HIV making them more frequent and less taboo. They also found that medical testing increased as a result.

Rwandan Red Cross Volunteers provided critical care to families impacted by AIDS. Volunteers were trained on how to care for patients with AIDS and trained on how to teach families to provide this critical care for those at home. This training can also be utilized to care for those with other types of infectious diseases.

=== COVID-19 pandemic ===
Throughout the pandemic, Red Cross volunteers have worked on education initiatives regarding the pandemic, precautions that can be taken to mitigate the spread, and vaccines awareness. In addition, they have provided material resources to families severely impacted by the pandemic. In 2020, the French Agency for Development (AFD) partnered with the Rwandan Red Cross to develop preventative measures and treatment plans to help reduce the spread of COVID-19. The AFD received these funds through a 2 million Euro grant provided by the International Committee of the Red Cross (ICRC). The grant was aimed to provide in-kind support for families around the country and assist with the Rwandan Red Cross's low resource supply. In October 2022, the Rwandan Red Cross partnered with the Saving Lives and Livelihoods Program (SLL) and the Africa Center for Disease Control. This partnership is aimed to combat the vaccine hesitancy that is currently taking place in parts of Rwanda.

=== Model Villages in Rwanda ===
In 2008, " “Agasozi Ndatwa” or Model Villages were established by the RRC. They are partnered with the Austrian Red Cross, the Spanish Red Cross, Belgian Red Cross, and the Danish Red Cross as they provide assistance both monetary and logistically. The first iteration of this village was in 2010. The goal of these villages is to try and raise the standard of living through interconnected communication and assistance. They try create these villages in the most vulnerable areas and create simple and effective models that other areas can build off of and implement. The RRC works directly with locals to determine their needs. The locals and the community are part of the entire process. They determine their needs, but they also participate in monitoring the interventions that have been put in place. Model villages are meant to provide assistance with sanitation, hygiene, nutrition, agriculture, access to clean water, and other various forms of intervention meant to increase a person's livelihood and ultimately community development.

=== Disaster and Risk Reduction ===
In March 2023, Rwanda held the first national conference on disaster risk reduction and management. The IFRC, ICRC, and RCC are key stakeholders. The RCC is connected to this as one of the goals of the organization is harm reduction and strengthening humanitarian efforts in conjunction with innovation necessary for development. The RCC is collaborating with all sectors responsible in creating the Disaster and Risk Reduction plan in order to uphold its mission.
