= Latvian Red Cross =

National Red Cross Society in Latvia

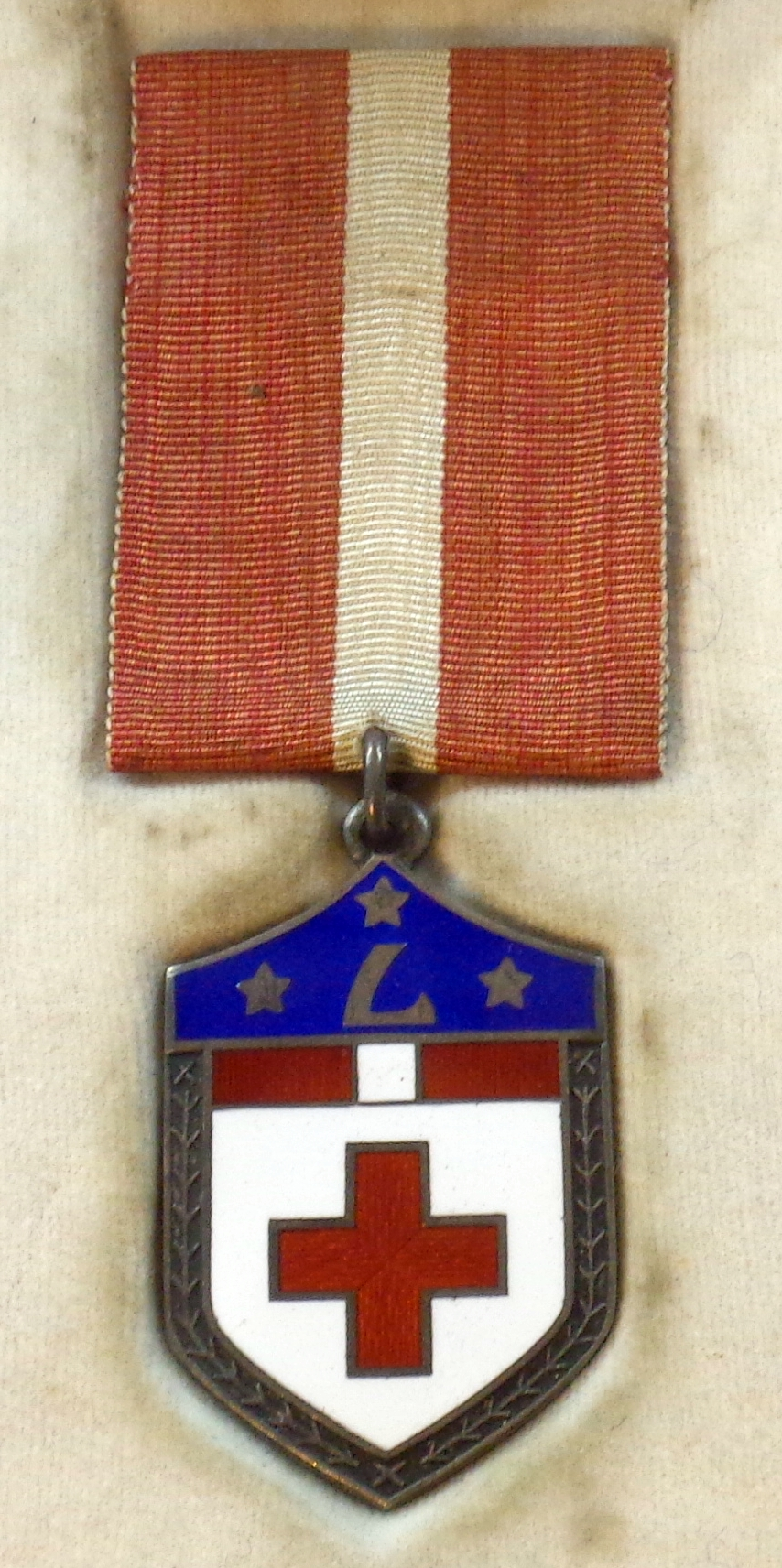
Medal of Merit of the Latvian Red Cross 3rd class

The Latvian Red Cross (Latvian: Latvijas Sarkanais Krusts) is a non-governmental non-profit volunteer-led humanitarian organization, and the national Red Cross Society in Latvia.

The Latvian Red Cross was established 20 November 1918 in Riga, only two days after the proclamation of the independent Republic of Latvia. During the earliest time of the Latvian republic, the Latvian Red Cross took care of refugees and prisoners of war of the recently ended World War I. During the Latvian War of Independence the Latvian Red Cross also aided the wounded and sick. In the beginning of 1919 the Latvian Red Cross operated hospitals in Jelgava, Liepāja, Valka and Rūjiena; in the second half of 1919—Riga, Pļaviņas, Smiltene and Gulbene. The Latvian Red Cross was recognized by the International Federation of Red Cross and Red Crescent in 1923.

In 1938 the Latvian Red Cross had 3,500 members, 10 hospitals with 1,000 beds, tuberculosis sanatoriums in Tērvete, Krimulda, Liepāja and Cēsis with room for 800 clients. It also had 92 health care units, 159 ambulances, 10 emergency stations, three pharmacies, two nursing schools, a storage facility and an orthopedic workshop.

The economy of the Latvian Red Cross was mainly supported by sales of lottery tickets, a state monopoly on the sale of playing cards, a surcharge to railway tickets and donations. Heads of the Latvian Red Cross were professor, surgeon Jānis Jankovskis (1918–25), doctor Kārlis Kasparsons (1926–29) and dentist Kārlis Barons (1930–40).

The Latvian Red Cross was liquidated after the Soviet occupation of Latvia in 1940. Initially operations resumed after the German occupation of Latvia in 1941, but were interrupted later by the German authorities. The Latvian Red Cross was restored 1945 in exile after World War II ended. It was restored in wartorn Germany by Latvian refugees, headquarters were in Münster.

On 26 April 1991 the 11th Latvian Red Cross congress took place in Riga. At this congress it was proclaimed, that the current Latvian Red Cross is the only legal successor of the 1918 founded organization.
