= Somali Red Crescent Society =

Somali Humanitarian and Non-political Organization

Somali Red Crescent Society Ururka Bisha Cas
- Ururka Bisha Cas Soomaaliyeed
- The emblem of the Somali Red Crescent Society.
- Abbreviation: SRCS
- Formation: 1963
- Type: Humanitarian organization
- Purpose: Humanitarian aid
- Location: Somalia
- Region served: Somalia
- Official language: Somali Language
- President: Ahmed M. Hassan
- Affiliations: IFRC
- Website: www.bishacas-srcs.org

The Somali Red Crescent Society (SRCS), (Somali: Ururka Bisha Cas ee Soomaaliyeed UBCS ) is a non-political, independent humanitarian organization in Somalia and is part of the International Red Cross and Red Crescent Movement.

== History ==
The society was established in April 1963 through the Presidential Decree No. 187 in 1965. In 1969, it was formally recognized by the International Committee of the Red Cross (ICRC) and became a member of the International Federation of Red Cross and Red Crescent Societies

== Main programs and activities ==
=== Healthcare ===
==== Outpatient and mobile clinics ====
Since 1991, SRCS has been providing health services to the people of Somalia through a system of 62 Maternal and Child Health Outpatient (MCH/OPD) clinics and 4 mobile clinics, targeting vulnerable groups in the community such as mothers, children and wounded individuals. These permanent and mobile clinics are designed to serve the immediate neighborhood communities and remote villages respectively, with a focus on reducing mortality and morbidity. In 2009, 623,342 patients benefitted from the treatments offered in total.

==== Rehabilitation programmes ====
The SRCS rehabilitation programmes provide health care services to physically disabled people in Somalia through its three rehabilitation centers, which are located in Mogadishu, Hargeisa and Galkayo. Prosthesis and orthosis appliances are produced in the workshops of these centers, with physiotherapy departments that offer physiotherapy treatment. In 2009, 429 orthoses and 534 prostheses were produced while 1924 persons received physiotherapy treatment.

==== Keysaney Teaching Hospital ====
Keysaney is one of the largest surgical hospitals in Somalia which focuses on trauma, surgery including electives and referrals from Mogadishu and the other cities of the country. Keysaney functions as the main teaching hospital in surgery and trauma for residents, interns and students in Somalia.

The hospital is Located in Mogadishu, the capital city and was established in 1992, the hospital assisted thousands of weapon and non weapon wounded patients since the outbreak of the civil war. Support is rendered by the ICRC in the form of payment of salaries and providing medicines and medical equipment through the SRCS. During 2009, 3856 were admitted in the hospital, of which 2361 were patients wounded by weapons.

==== HIV and AIDS program ====
As of 2006, 44,000 Somalis were estimated to be infected with HIV, which is around 0.9% of the population. The HIV and AIDS program initiated by the SRCS focuses on prevention, treatment, care and support throughout the country. There was great emphasis on changing the behavior of the sexually active cohort by promoting safe sex practices, voluntary testing and counselling. In 2009, awareness sessions were conducted by the SRCS HIV staff and volunteers to educate the communities on the risk of HIV infections. 127,000 people benefited from the sessions in total.

==== WatSan programme ====
The water and sanitation project is a collaboration between the SRCS and German Red Cross which targets the rural population in Somalia. The aim of the project is to increase the availability of safe water for human consumption, livestock and agriculture so as to meet the basic needs of the target population. Shallow wells and piped water systems were constructed to manage water supply while family latrines were built for improved sanitation. Water filters were given to communities using unsafe surface waters to ensure safe consumption. The total number direct and indirect beneficiaries was 3825 and 22,950 respectively.

== See also ==
- Somalia
- List of Red Cross and Red Crescent Societies
