= Aurelia Ramos de Segarra =

Uruguayan philanthropist, founder of the Uruguayan Red Cross

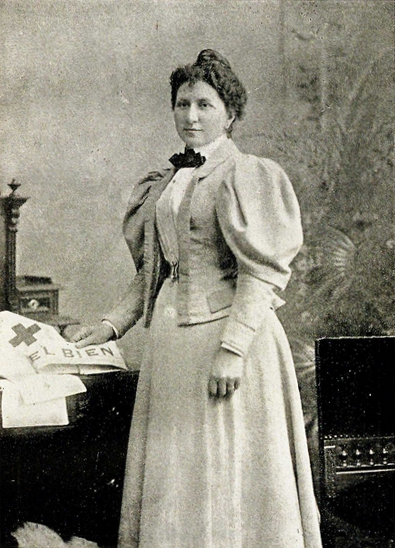
- Born: Aurelia Ramos; 1860; Uruguay
- Died: 1927 (aged 66–67); Uruguay
- Occupation: philanthropist
- Spouse: José Segarra

Aurelia Ramos de Segarra (1860–1927) was a Uruguayan philanthropist.

In 1897, on the wake of the Revolution of 1897, she helped establish the Red Cross of Christian Ladies. Later on it was renamed Uruguayan Red Cross.

== Literature ==
- Peirano, Ricardo (2000–2002). Gran Enciclopedia del Uruguay. Barcelona: Sol 90. OCLC 51576630.
