= Guatemalan Red Cross =

Guatemalan humanitarian association

- Abbreviation: CRG
- Formation: April 22, 1923; 101 years ago
- Type: Non-governmental organization
- Purpose: medical and humanitarian
- Location: Guatemala City, Guatemala

The Guatemalan Red Cross (Spanish: La Sociedad Nacional de la Cruz Roja Guatemalteca) was founded on April 22, 1923. It is headquartered in Guatemala City in Guatemala. Like other national Red Cross and Red Crescent chapters, the Guatemalan Red Cross is a non-profit whose mission is to provide assistance to people in at risk or affected by conflict, disaster and other crisis situations.

== See also ==
- List of Red Cross and Red Crescent Societies
- International Red Cross and Red Crescent Movement
