= Yemen Red Crescent Society =

Yemeni humanitarian association

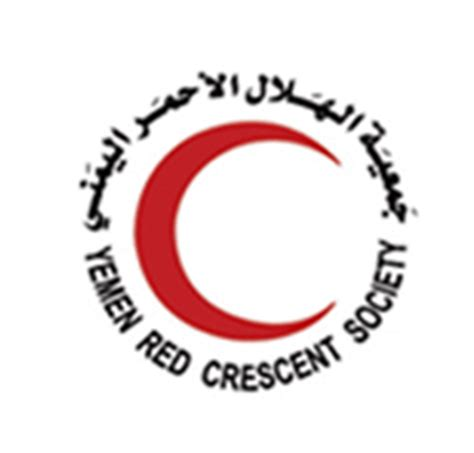
Logo

The Yemen Red Crescent Society (Arabic: جمعية الهلال الأحمر اليمني, romanized: Jamʻīyat al-Hilāl al-Aḥmar al-Yamanī) is a Yemeni humanitarian association founded in 1968. The group is a national affiliate of the International Federation of Red Cross and Red Crescent Societies.

== Main goals ==
Speaking in 2018, the Secretary General of the International Federation of Red Cross and Red Crescent Societies, Elhadj As Sy, said that the priorities for the organization in 2019 would be: preparing for the next pandemic; moving to protect vulnerable populations like women, children, displaced persons and disabled persons; and preparing for climate-related issues.

== Activities and history ==
Founding

Abdullah Alkhamesi was the founder of the Yemen Red Crescent Society. He stayed on as general secretary until the 2000s. He died in 2017 after being unable to access the necessary medical treatment in Yemen.

Yemeni Civil War

The Yemen Red Crescent Society is one of a small group of humanitarian organizations still providing help to civilians on the ground in Yemen currently. Several aid workers have been hurt or killed in their work in Yemen; four Yemeni Red Crescent workers died alone in 6 months in 2015.

== See also ==
- List of Red Cross and Red Crescent Societies
- International Red Cross and Red Crescent Movement
