= Nicaraguan Red Cross =

- Cruz Roja Nicaragüense
- Formation: 10 January 1934; 92 years ago
- Founders: Henry Debayle; Emelina Tercero de Debayle; Rodolfo Espinoza Ramírez
- Dissolved: 9 May 2023
- Type: Nonprofit
- Purpose: Humanitarian aid
- Headquarters: Managua, Nicaragua
- Region served: Nicaragua
- President: Oscar Gutiérrez
- Parent organization: International Federation of Red Cross and Red Crescent Societies
- Subsidiaries: 32 branches
- Volunteers: 2,000 (2022)
- Website: cruzrojanicaraguense.org (archived at the Wayback Machine (archived 16 August 2023))

The Nicaraguan Red Cross (Spanish: Cruz Roja Nicaragüense), was a humanitarian aid organization that was a member of the Red Cross Society and the national ambulance service in Nicaragua. Founded on 10 January 1934, it was the country's emergency medical response organization. The Nicaraguan Red Cross had its headquarters in Managua.

In May 2023 the Nicaraguan government passed a law to close the agency amid a government crackdown on charities, civic groups, and religious groups and democratic backsliding under Daniel Ortega's leadership. The law was passed after the Nicaraguan government accused the Red Cross of attacking the country's "peace and stability" during the 2018 Nicaraguan protests during which it helped treat injured protesters.

The law also ordered the seizure of the Red Cross's properties by the government and ordered the government's ministry of health to create their own "Red Cross" society, which later became the White Cross (Cruz Blanca).
