= Qatar Red Crescent Society =

Qatari branch of the Red Crescent Society

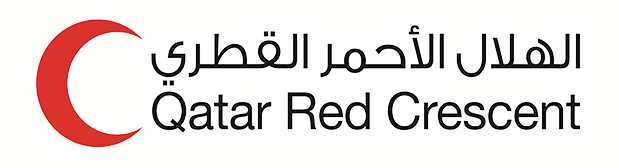
Logo

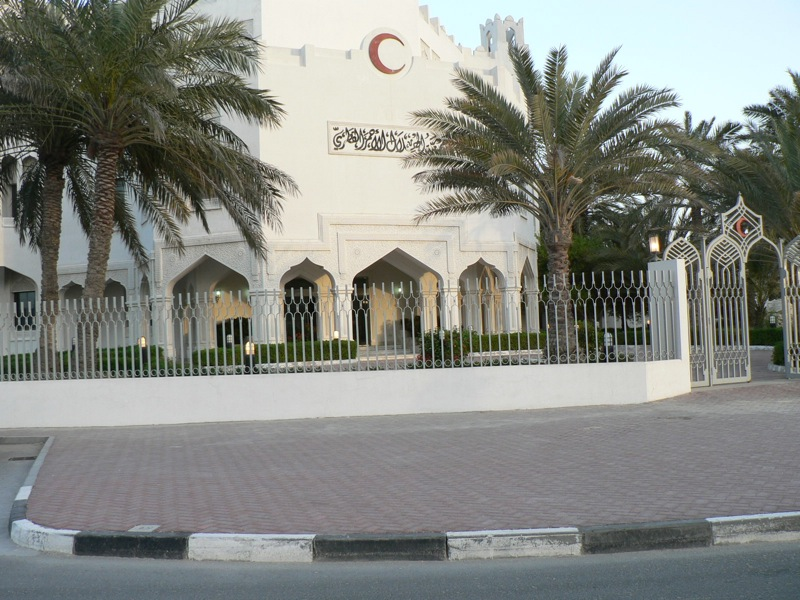
The headquarters of the Qatar Red Crescent Society in Doha

The Qatar Red Crescent Society (QRCS; Arabic: جمعية الهلال الأحمر القطري, romanized: Jamʻīyat al-Hilāl al-Aḥmar al-Qaṭarī), the Qatari branch of the Red Crescent Society, was established in 1978. In 1981, it gained international recognition from the International Committee of the Red Cross in Geneva and joined the International Federation of Red Cross and Red Crescent Societies (IFRC). It is also a member of the Secretariat of Arab Red Crescent Societies in Jeddah. It became the first philanthropic organization in Qatar to establish a women's branch in 1982.

QRC is headquartered in Doha, but the organization works throughout the country. Their primary goal is to reduce detrimental effects of catastrophe and relieve suffering by contributing social and humanitarian services coinciding with the mission of its parent organization, the Red Crescent.

== Activities ==
=== Domestic activities ===
QRC was the first voluntary charity organization in Qatar. It is very active in aiding and developing relief programs for victims of disaster worldwide. Within Qatar, their programs include social development, training and qualification, awareness and education, programs and medical service, and advocacy community issues. Internationally QRC engages in relief and humanitarian activities, development and empowerment, and advocacy and humanitarian diplomacy.

In February 1985, the QRC created the Disabled Club, a social club for disabled children and the first of its kind in the country.

During the conflict in the Gaza Strip in fall 2014, the QRC helped, with Qatari government contributions, by providing medical supplies and fuel for hospitals.

=== International activities ===
==== Mali ====
Qatar Red Crescent Society was the only humanitarian organization present in Northern Mali following the Islamist takeover. This presence raised questions over whether QRC was supporting the Islamists or helping local population. QRC's stated purpose of the mission was to "distribute food aid to 1,000 households and conduct an assessment of the population's needs in water, sanitation, health and food security."

==== Gaza Strip ====
In the September 2014 Gaza conflict, QRC was on the ground providing medical and ambulance services. They also donated several million Qatari Riyals to provide relief for Gaza. On May 17, 2021, the offices run by QRC in Gaza were destroyed in an Israeli airstrike, as a result of ongoing confrontations.

==== Syria ====
The QRC has also been active in Syria where it has engaged in ongoing humanitarian efforts to build roads in the Latakia Countryside and ensure secure transportation of those injured in the conflict to safer adjacent territories. They also launched a psychological support center in 2013 for refugees of the Syrian crisis. On August 13, 2023, Qatar Red Crescent Society launched a fundraising campaign that ensured life-saving medical care for patients with cancer in northern Syria. The campaign raised QR 5,060,000 in donations. QRCS provided essential chemotherapy and immunotherapy medications for 220 Syrian refugees and displaced people with cancer. QRCS immediately allocated $1 million to procure quantities of medicines, diagnostic and therapeutic equipment.

==== Sudan ====
In West Darfur, QRC has been instrumental in providing agricultural machinery to improve the livelihoods of local communities. QRC has had a representative office in West Darfur to oversee its projects there since 2009.

== Partnerships ==
The International Federation of Red Cross and Red Crescent Societies partnered with Qatar-based Al Jazeera Media Network in May 2014. This agreement built on relations developed over several years between QRC and Al Jazeera. The goal of the agreement was to give a voice to the voiceless by drawing attention and support to the victims of disasters.

In coordination with QRC, the IFRC signed a partnership agreement in 2013 with Qatar's Cultural Village Foundation ("Katara") to help build more resilient and peaceful communities in the Middle East and North Africa.

In August 2012, QRC signed a partnership agreement with the Mali Red Cross to "ensure strong coordination in planning and implementing projects in Northern Mali".

The United Nations publicly rejected these claims and subsequently co-organized high-profile activities with these relief organizations in 2017. In this initiative, all 3 Qatari organizations contributed for the Syrian refugees and signed agreements worth $8.5 million with World Food Programme, UNICEF, World Health Organization, UN refugee agency (UNHCR) and Office for the Coordination of Humanitarian Affairs (OCHA). The deal was signed in Doha during July 2018.

According to the United Nations and US Department of State, Qatar is the second largest contributor to the United Nations fund for counter terrorism out of the 35 donors. This was revealed in the fourth high level strategic dialogue with the United Nations' Office of Counter Terrorism (UNOCT) during March 2022. Both parties (Qatar and UNOCT) discussed strategic priorities and collaboration for effective United Nations support to member's state on counter terrorism.

It was also disclosed that in 2019, the Qatari government drafted new AML/CFT legislation, which finalized and passed into law in September and as of that year, there have been no terrorist activities in Qatar. The nation maintains an inter-agency of national anti-terrorism committee (NATC) which is composed of representatives from more than 10 government agencies says the country reports on terrorism 2019 by US Department of State.

None of the Qatari humanitarian organizations has ever been listed on the UN terror list established and maintained pursuant to Security Council res. 1267/1989/2253.

== Organization ==
The leadership of QRC includes the following individuals:

- Chairman of the Board/President: Dr. Mohammed Bin Ghanim A. Al-Ali Almaadid
- Secretary General: Saleh Ali Al-Muhanadi
- Acting Director of Finance and Investment: Mohamed Mohiy Khalifa
- Director of Human Resources and Admin Services: Nayef Faisal S. Almohannadi
- Director of Medical Affairs: Dr. Hassan Alyafi
- Director of Organizational Development: Muhammad Mujahid
- Director of Public Communications Department: Rajaa Saleh
- Director of Resource Mobilization: Saad Shaheen Al-Kaabi
- Director of Social Development: Rashid Saad Almohanadi
- Head of International Relations: Fawzi Oussedik
- Head of Volunteering: Najat Abdrhman Al-Haidous
