= Bahrain Red Crescent Society =

Humanitarian organization in Bahrain

- Abbreviation: BRCS
- Purpose: Humanitarian
- Headquarters: Manama
- Location: Kingdom of Bahrain
- Region served: Bahrain and the Middle East
- Official language: Arabic
- General Secretary: Dr. Fawzi Amin
- President: Abdulla Bin Khalid Al Khalifa
- Vice-President: Ali Mohammed Murad
- Affiliations: International Red Crescent
- Website: www.rcsbahrain.org

Bahrain Red Crescent Society (Arabic: جمعية الهلال الأحمر البحريني, romanized: Jamʻīyat al-Hilāl al-Aḥmar al-Baḥraynī) was established in 1971, via a charter issued by Sheikh Isa bin Salman Al Khalifa, the Amir of Bahrain at the time. The society was recognized by the International Federation of Red Cross and Red Crescent Societies on 14 September 1972. It is the 116th member of the international group since its inception in 1919. It has its headquarters in Hoora, Manama.
