= Colombian Red Cross =

Colombian-based nonprofit private entity

- Cruz Roja Colombiana
- Logo of the Colombian Red Cross

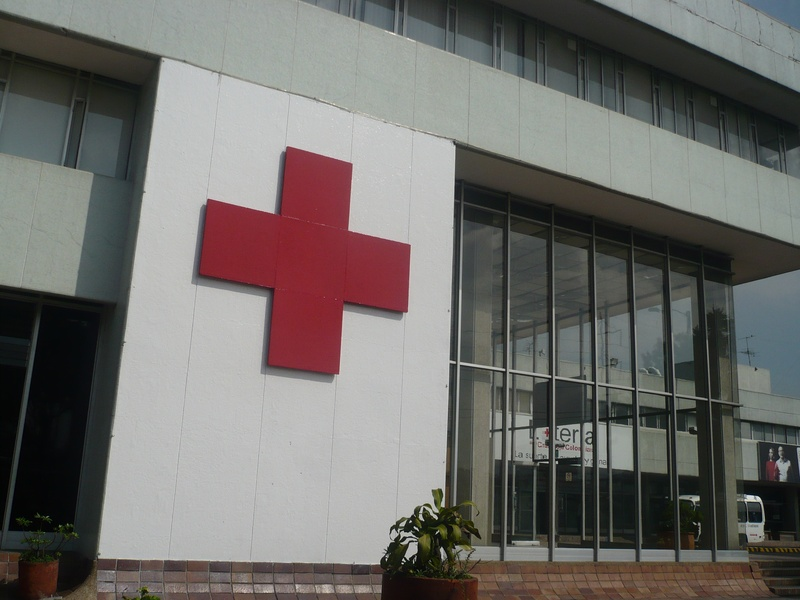
- Headquarters of the Colombian Red Cross in Bogotá (2010)
- Abbreviation: CRC
- Formation: July 30, 1915
- Type: NPO, Aid agency
- Purpose: Humanitarian aid
- Headquarters: Bogotá, Colombia
- Location: Colombia
- Region served: Colombian territory and neighboring countries. (During disasters)
- Official language: Spanish
- President: Fernando José Cardenas Guerrero
- Affiliations: International Federation of Red Cross and Red Crescent Societies
- Staff: 3,000
- Volunteers: 42,000
- Website: Cruz Roja Colombiana

The Colombian Red Cross (Cruz Roja Colombiana, CRC) is a private nonprofit organization that provides humanitarian aid and disaster relief to people in need during emergencies within the territory of Colombia. It is a member of the International Federation of Red Cross and Red Crescent Societies (IFRC). It has played a major humanitarian role within the Colombian conflict as a mediator in the area of human rights.

== History ==
=== Founding ===
The National Society of the Colombian Red Cross was founded in 1915. The idea behind the Colombian Red Cross was first conceived by physician and member of the National Academy of Medicine Dr. Hipolito Machado and his pupil Dr. Adriano Perdomo. Others involved in the CRC's founding were entrepreneur Santiago Samper, who initially sponsored the organization, and physicians Jose Maria Montoya and Nicolas Buendia. Some of those involved were participants in the Thousand Days War, utilizing a horse-drawn carriage as an ambulance to transport victims from battlefields. The society was recognized domestically by the Colombian government in 1916 and internationally by the International Red Cross in 1922.

=== Role in the Colombian conflict ===
The Colombian Red Cross has worked to prevent human rights violations and provide humanitarian aid during the ongoing Colombian conflict.

According to a 2009 report by the International Committee of the Red Cross (ICRC), the CRC has intervened in the conflict in the areas of forced disappearances, homicides and direct attacks against people protected by international human rights law, occupation of private and public civilian properties, sexual violence, recruitment of minors by illegal armed groups, physical and psychological abuse and threats, proliferation of weapons that could affect communities, and forced displacement.

== Organization ==
The Colombian Red Cross currently exists under Law 852 of 2003 which dictates the scope of its activities and Law 875 of 2004 which regulates the use of its emblem.

== Operations ==
Flag of the Colombian Red Cross

The CRC distributes food and non-food aid, including blankets and medicine. The CRC provides emergency assistance to the country's large population of internally displaced persons (IDPs).

Colombian Red Cross operations include:

- National Office of Aid
- National Office of Health
- Transport of resources
- Colombian Red Cross Lottery
- Blood banks
- National Office of Teaching
- Volunteering
- National Office of Cooperation and Development
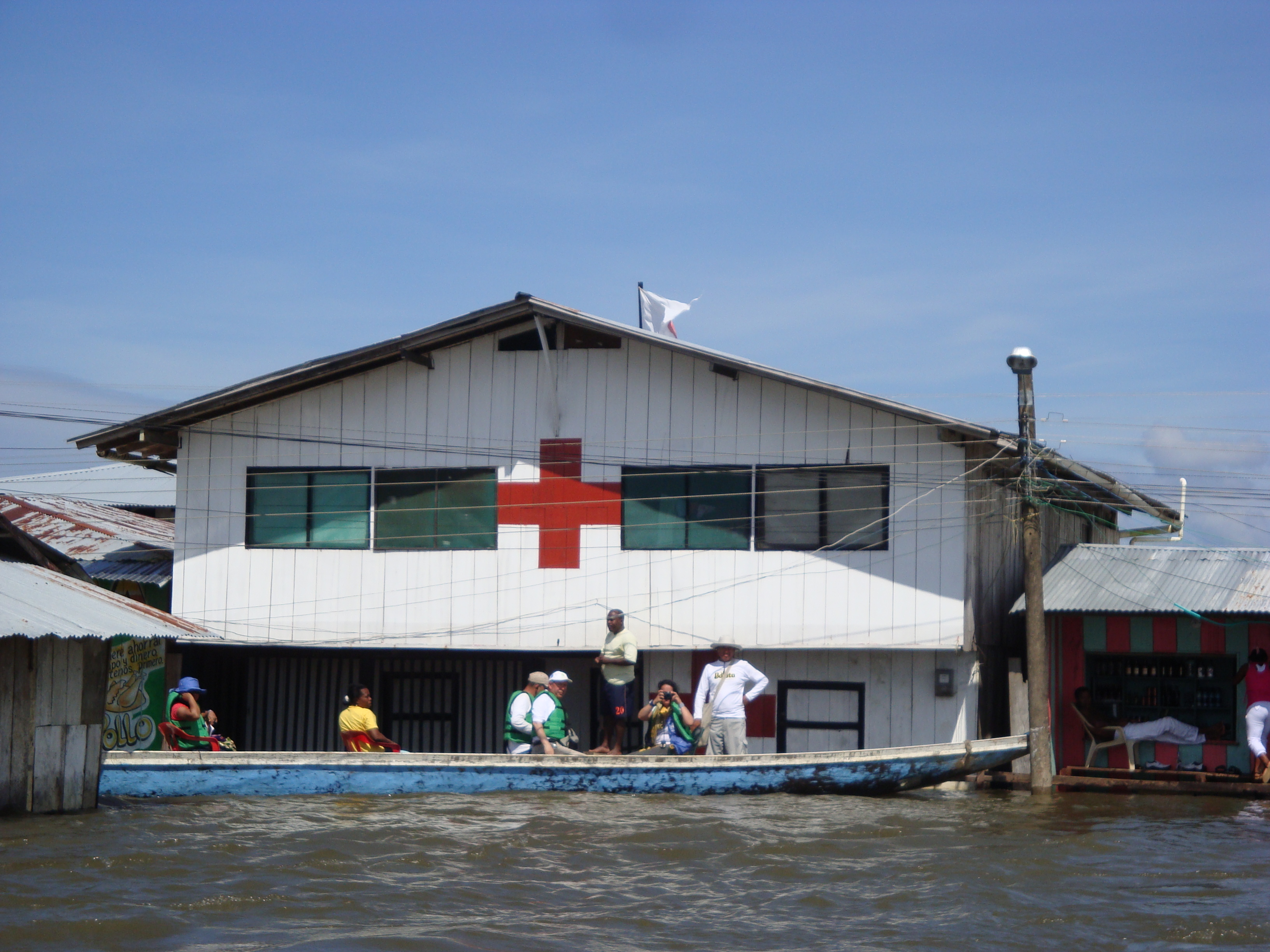
Colombian Red Cross building in Riosucio, Chocó (2010).

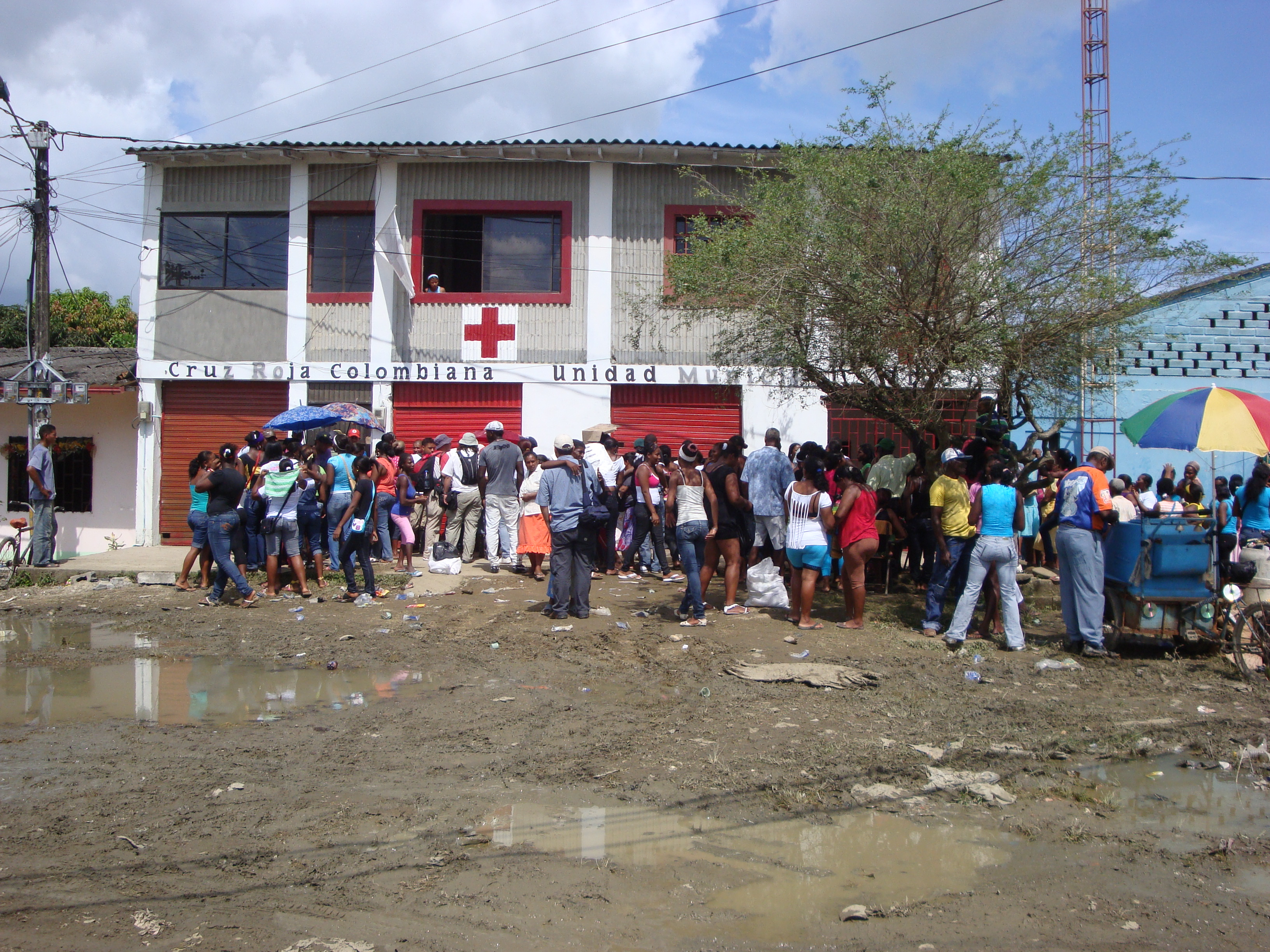
Colombian Red Cross Unit in Turbo, Antioquia (2010).

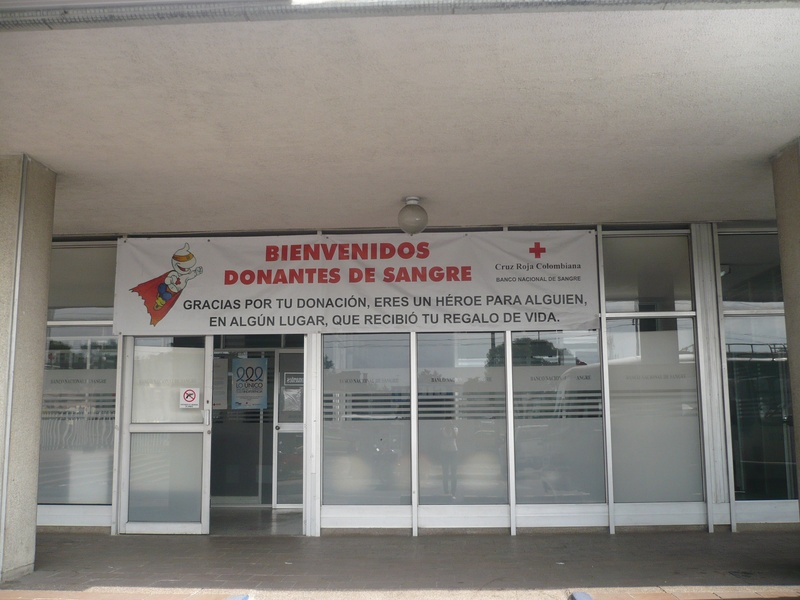
Blood bank operated by the Colombian Red Cross in Bogotá (2010).

== See also ==
- International Red Cross and Red Crescent Movement
- Human rights in Colombia
- List of Red Cross and Red Crescent societies
