= Kiribati Red Cross Society =

Organization

- Founded: 1965
- Type: Non-profit organisation
- Purpose: Humanitarian Aid
- Location: Kiribati
- Affiliations: International Committee of the Red Cross; International Federation of Red Cross and Red Crescent Societies

The Kiribati Red Cross Society was founded in 1965. It has its headquarters in Bairiki, Kiribati.

== Establishment ==
The Red Cross Society of Kiribati was established in 1965.
