= Saint Kitts and Nevis Red Cross Society =

- Formation: 1942
- Type: Aid agency
- Purpose: Humanitarian aid
- Location: Saint Kitts and Nevis
- Affiliations: International Federation of Red Cross and Red Crescent Societies
- Website: www.facebook.com/sknrcs/

Saint Kitts and Nevis Red Cross Society was established in 1942 as a branch of the British Red Cross. It was recognised as a separate national Red Cross Society in 1985.

It has its headquarters in Basseterre.
