= Burkinabe Red Cross Society =

Red cross of Burkina Faso

Burkinabé Red Cross Society
- Founded: 1961
- Type: Non-profit organisation
- Purpose: Humanitarian Aid
- Location: Burkina Faso
- Affiliations: International Committee of the Red Cross; International Federation of Red Cross and Red Crescent Societies

The Burkinabé Red Cross Society (French: La Croix-Rouge Burkinabè) was founded in 1961. It is headquartered in Ouagadougou, Burkina Faso.

In 2020 the Burkinabé Red Cross Society was targeted by manipulation campaign.
