= The Comoros Red Crescent =

The Comoros Red Crescent Society (French: Croissant-Rouge comorien, Arabic: جمعية الهلال الأحمر في جزر القمر, romanized: Jamʻīyat al-Hilāl al-Aḥmar fī Juzur al-Qamar) was founded in 1982, and it is the part of the recognition by the International Red Cross and Red Crescent Movement in 2005. The national headquarters of The Comoros Red Crescent is in Moroni and the other three regional branches are each located are Grande Comore, Anjouan, and Moheli islands of the Comoros. The warehouse which it was built in 2013 with the help from The French Development Agency of France. But they can store 80 tonnes of relief supplies. There are 6,600 Members, 3,600 Volunteers, and 11 Salaried employees of The Comoros Red Crescent Authority.

== See also ==
- International Committee of the Red Cross
- International Red Cross and Red Crescent Movement
