= Brunei Darussalam Red Crescent Society =

- Founded: 1997
- Type: Non-profit organisation
- Purpose: Humanitarian Aid
- Location: Brunei
- Affiliations: International Committee of the Red Cross; International Federation of Red Cross and Red Crescent Societies

The Brunei Darussalam Red Crescent Society (Malay: Persatuan Bulan Sabit Merah Negara Brunei Darussalam, Jawi: ڤرساتوان بولن سابيت ميره نݢارا بروني دارالسلام) was established in 1997. It has its headquarters in Bandar Seri Begawan.
