= Central African Red Cross Society =

- Abbreviation: CRCA
- Founded: 1966
- Type: Non-profit organisation
- Purpose: Humanitarian Aid
- Location: Central African Republic
- Affiliations: International Committee of the Red Cross; International Federation of Red Cross and Red Crescent Societies

The Central African Red Cross Society (French: Croix-Rouge centrafricaine), abbreviated CRCA, was founded in 1966. It has its head in Bangui, Central African Republic.
