= Red Crescent Society of Uzbekistan =

Organization

- Founded: November 14, 1925
- Type: Non-profit organisation
- Purpose: Humanitarian Aid
- Location: Uzbekistan
- Affiliations: International Committee of the Red Cross; International Federation of Red Cross and Red Crescent Societies
- Website: https://www.ifrc.org/national-societies-directory/red-crescent-society-uzbekistan

The Red Crescent Society of Uzbekistan (RCSU) was founded in 1925. It has its headquarters in Tashkent.
