= Togolese Red Cross =

- Founded: 1959
- Type: Non-profit organisation
- Purpose: Humanitarian Aid
- Location: Togo
- Affiliations: International Committee of the Red Cross; International Federation of Red Cross and Red Crescent Societies

Togolese Red Cross (French: Croix-Rouge togolaise) was established in 1959. It has its headquarters in Lomé.
