= Palau Red Cross Society =

- Founded: 1977
- Type: Non-profit organisation
- Purpose: Humanitarian Aid
- Location: Palau
- Affiliations: International Committee of the Red Cross; International Federation of Red Cross and Red Crescent Societies

The Palau Red Cross Society was founded in 1977. It has its headquarters in Koror.
