= Zambia Red Cross Society =

Nonprofit organization based in Zambia

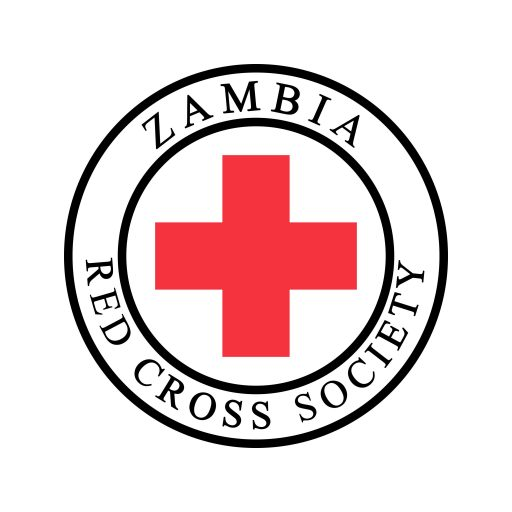
- Founded: 1966
- Type: Non-profit organisation
- Purpose: Humanitarian Aid
- Location: Zambia
- Affiliations: International Committee of the Red Cross; International Federation of Red Cross and Red Crescent Societies
- Website: https://redcross.org.zm/

The Zambia Red Cross Society was established in 1966 by an act of the Zambian Parliament. It had earlier started out as a branch of the British Red Cross. It has its headquarters in Lusaka.
