= South African Red Cross Society =

Organization

- Founded: 1921
- Type: Non-profit organisation
- Purpose: Humanitarian Aid
- Location: South Africa
- Affiliations: International Committee of the Red Cross; International Federation of Red Cross and Red Crescent Societies
- Website: https://redcross.org.za/

The South African Red Cross Society was founded in 1921. It has its headquarters in Johannesburg.
