= Uruguayan Red Cross =

- Cruz Roja Uruguaya

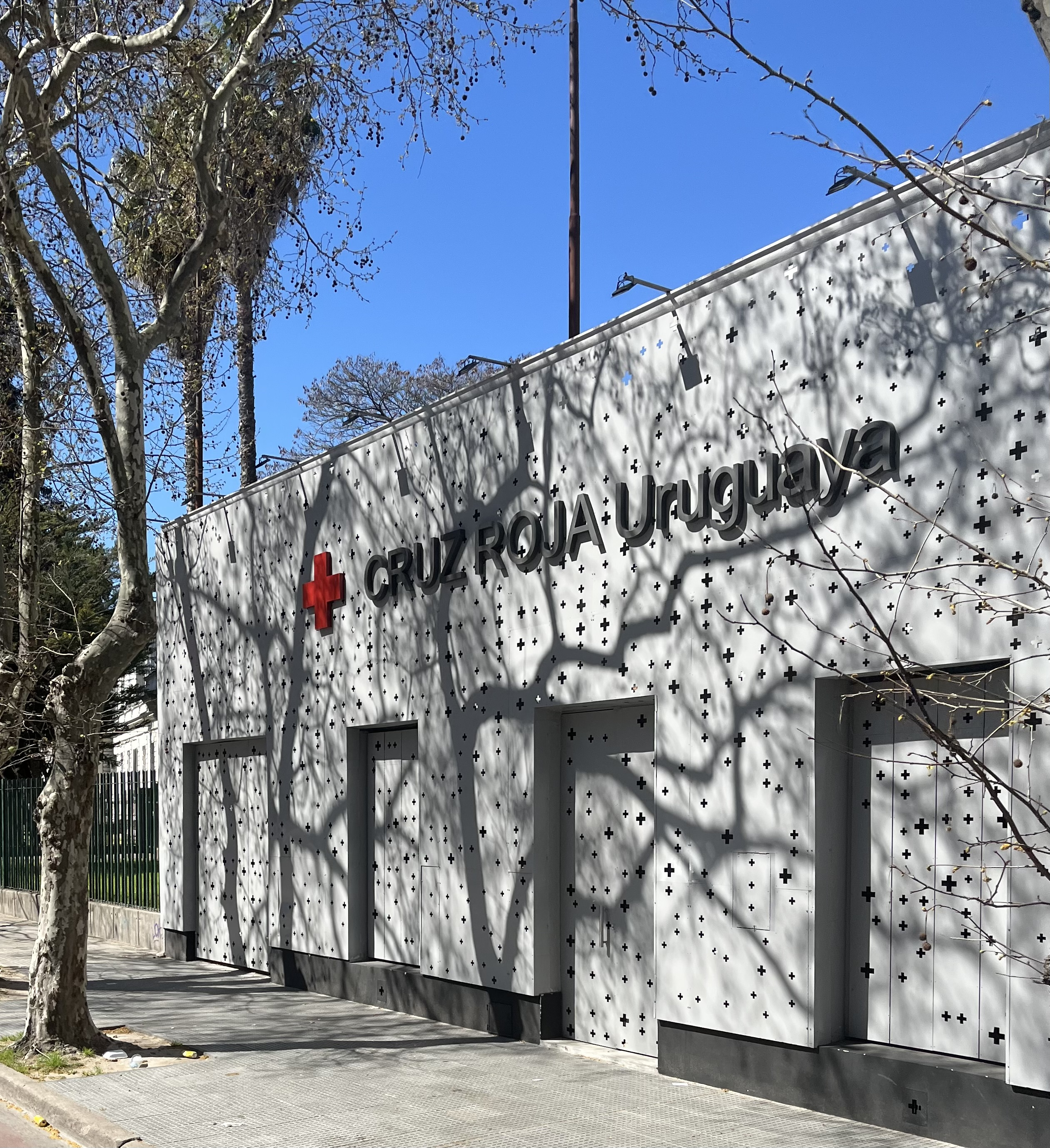
- Cruz Roja Uruguaya sede en 2025.
- Formation: 5 March 1897; 129 years ago
- Type: Non-profit
- Legal status: Active
- Purpose: Humanitarian
- Headquarters: Montevideo
- Region served: Uruguay
- Members: International Red Cross and Red Crescent Movement
- Website: www.cruzroja.org.uy

The Uruguayan Red Cross (Spanish: Cruz Roja Uruguaya) was founded in 1897 and it has its headquarters in Montevideo.

== Origins ==
In 1897, on the wake of the Revolution of 1897, the philanthropist Aurelia Ramos de Segarra established the Red Cross of Christian Ladies.

== See also ==
- International Red Cross and Red Crescent Movement
