= Brazilian Red Cross =

Brazilian humanitarian organization

- Cruz Vermelha Brasileira
- Logo of the Brazilian Red Cross

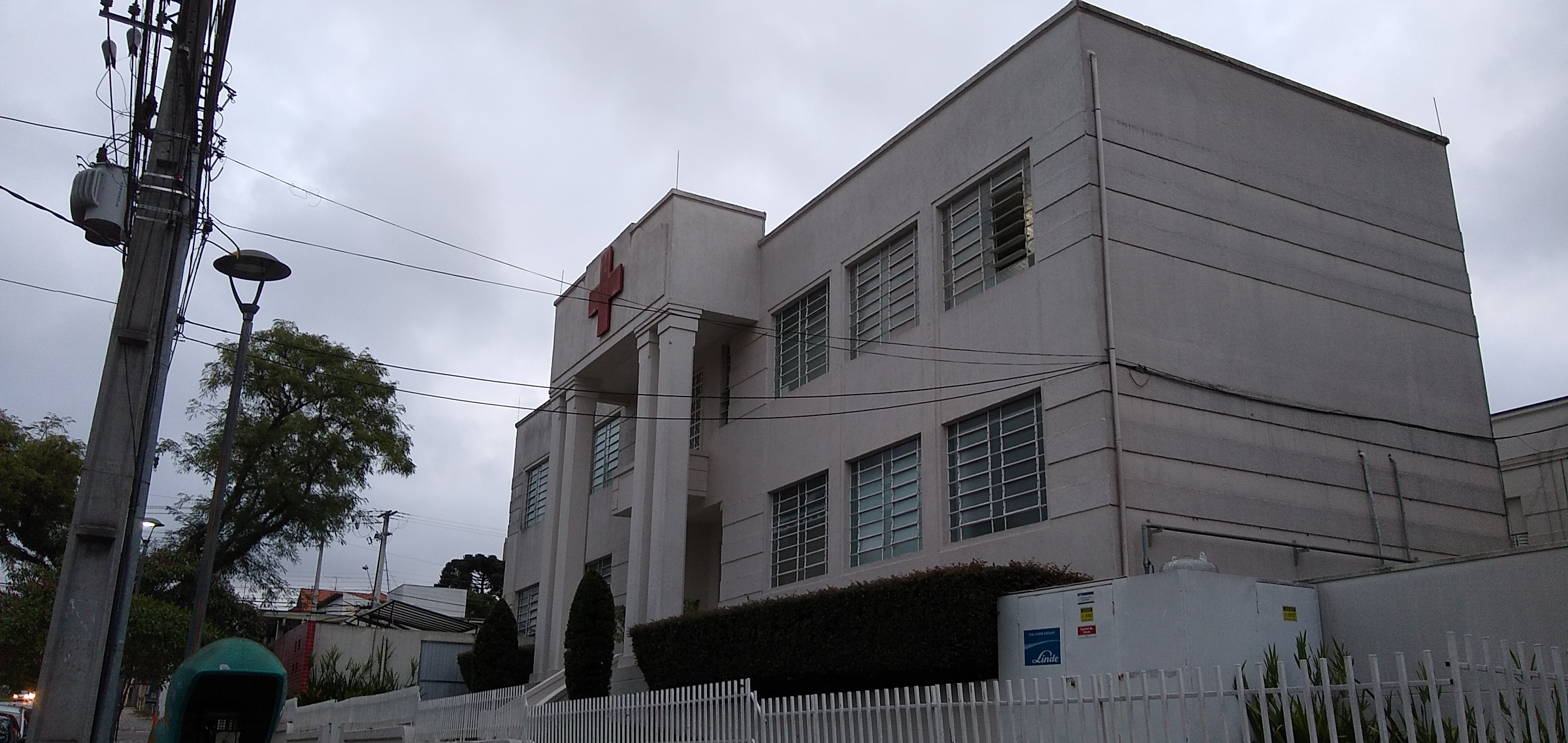
- The Brazilian Red Cross Hospital in Curitiba, state of Paraná
- Formation: 1908
- Type: Humanitarian aid
- Headquarters: Brasília
- Website: www.cruzvermelha.org.br

The Brazilian Red Cross (Brazilian Portuguese: Cruz Vermelha Brasileira) was founded in 1908. It has its headquarters in Brasília.

== History ==
In 1907, physician Joaquim de Oliveira Botelho proposed organizing the Brazilian Red Cross in Rio de Janeiro and gained support from members of the Brazilian Historic and Geographic Institute. Articles of Association were drafted and approved on 5 December 1908, and the organization gained recognition as a national branch of the International Committee of the Red Cross in the period from 1910 to 1912. In 1912, the physician Marie Rennotte founded the branch for the state of São Paulo. By 1919, the organization had joined the International Federation of Red Cross and Red Crescent Societies.

== See also ==
- International Red Cross and Red Crescent Movement
