= Senegalese Red Cross Society =

- Founded: 1962
- Type: Non-profit organisation
- Purpose: Humanitarian Aid
- Location: Senegal
- Affiliations: International Committee of the Red Cross; International Federation of Red Cross and Red Crescent Societies

Senegalese Red Cross Society (French: Croix-Rouge sénégalaise) was established by decree in 1962. It has its headquarters in Dakar.

Despite being a Muslim majority nation, it uses the Red Cross as its symbol for the society.
