= Red Cross of Benin =

Red Cross Society of Benin
- Abbreviation: RCB
- Founded: 1959
- Type: Non-profit organisation
- Purpose: Humanitarian Aid
- Location: Benin
- Affiliations: International Committee of the Red Cross; International Federation of Red Cross and Red Crescent Societies

The Red Cross Society of Benin, also known as RCB (French: Croix-Rouge Bénin) was founded in 1959. It has its headquarters in Porto-Novo, Benin.
