= Saint Lucia Red Cross =

- Founded: 1949
- Type: Non-profit organisation
- Purpose: Humanitarian Aid
- Location: Saint Lucia
- Affiliations: International Committee of the Red Cross; International Federation of Red Cross and Red Crescent Societies

The Saint Lucia Red Cross ("SLRC") was founded in 1949 as a branch of the British Red Cross and became a society of its own in 1983. It has its headquarters in Castries, Saint Lucia.
