= Kuwait Red Crescent Society =

Humanitarian organization in Kuwait

Kuwait Red Crescent Society جمعية الهلال الأحمر الكويت
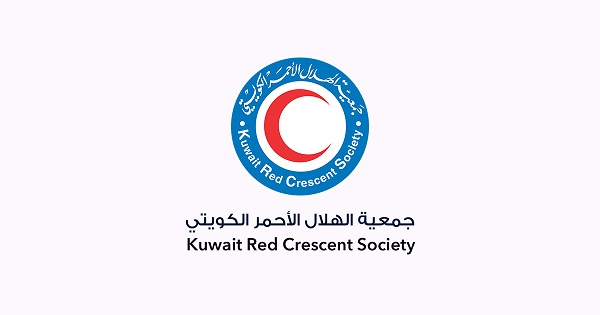
- Abbreviation: KRCS
- Founded: January 10, 1966; 60 years ago
- Type: Non-profit
- Purpose: Humanitarianism
- Location: Shuwaikh, Al Asimah (Kuwait)
- Coordinates: 29°20′35″N 47°56′50″E
- Key people: Barges H. Al Barges (President); Hilal M. Al Sayer (Deputy President); Saad A. Al Nahedh (Treasurer)
- Parent organization: Red Crescent Society
- Website: www.krcs.org.kw

The Kuwait Red Crescent Society (Arabic: جمعية الهلال الأحمر الكويت, romanized: Jamʻīyat al-Hilāl al-Aḥmar al-Kuwayt) is a branch of the international Red Crescent Society. It was established on January 10, 1966.

== Services ==
=== Disaster Response Emergency Fund ===
Originally designed to respond to small- and medium-sized disasters, the fund has evolved to include support for anticipatory action. The fund provides an efficient, fast, transparent, and localized way of getting funding directly to local humanitarian actors.

=== First Aid Training ===
Workers from the KRCS frequently attend conventions and public gatherings to teach the public about common first aid practices.

=== WASH (Water, Sanitation, and Hygiene) ===
The KRCS builds WASH infrastructure such as toilets and community water pumps. They also repair or build sewage systems, water storage and water treatment facilities.

== Founders ==
- Dr. Ibrahim Muhalhal Al Yassin
- Barges Humoud AL Barges
- The late Khalid Youssef Al Muttawaa
- Saad Ali Al Nahedh
- The late Sulaiman Khalid Al Muttawaa
- Dr. Abdulrahman Abdullah Al Awadi
- Abdullrahman Salem Al Attiqi
- The late Dr. Abdullrazaq Al Adwani
- Abdulaziz Hamad Al Sager
- Abdulaziz Mohamed Al Shayaa
- The late Abdullah Al Sultan Al Kuklaib
- Abdullah Ali AL Muttawaa
- Abdulmohsen Sauood Al Zabin
- Ali Mohamed Al Radhwan
- The late Mohamed Youssef Al Nissif
- Youssef Ibrahim Al Ghanem
- Youssef Jassem Al Haji
- Youssef Abdulaziz Al Fulaij

== History ==
The society was formally founded on January 10, 1966. Then, the society applied to the International Committee for recognition on December 28, 1967, and was recognized officially on June 6, 1968.

One of the first campaigns of the organization was a vaccination campaign against smallpox and cholera.

In 1990, the society responded to the Iraqi invasion of Kuwait by temporarily relocating its headquarters to Bahrain. The society trained around 250 volunteers to assist with relief efforts. Its volunteers helped transport wounded people, delivered aid to hospitals and refugee camps, and worked in hospitals and bakeries.

Following the September 11 attacks the society pledged to donate US$500,000 to assist victims.

In 2014, the Kuwait Red Crescent Society sent aid, including medical and food supplies, to Gaza.

As of 2026 the society is running a funding campaign titled "Your Zakat Changes Their Lives" encouraging a donation of 2.5% of total assets following the Islamic principle of Zakat.
