= Zimbabwe Red Cross Society =

Organization

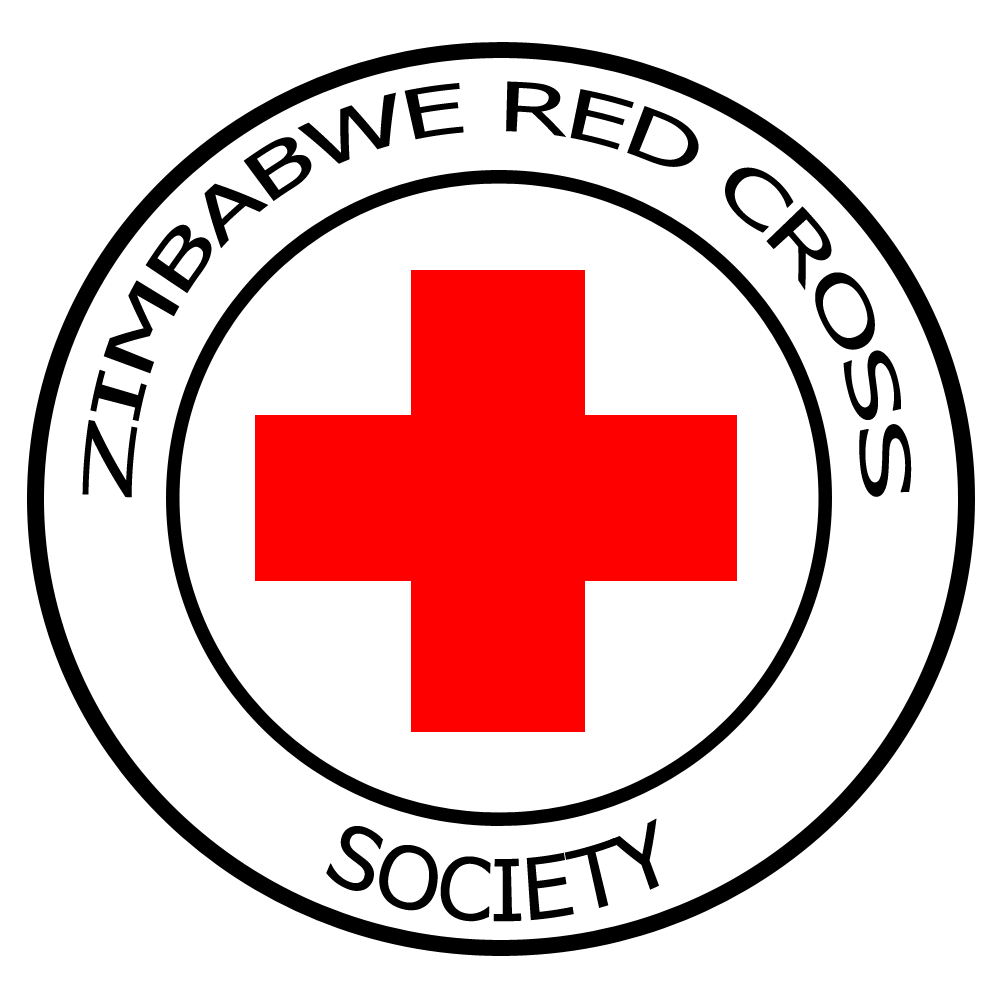
- Formation: 1981
- Headquarters: Harare
- Website: redcrosszim.org.zw

Zimbabwe Red Cross Society (ZRCS) was founded in 1981 by an act of the Zimbabwe Parliament. It has its headquarters in Harare.
