= Spanish Red Cross =

- Cruz Roja
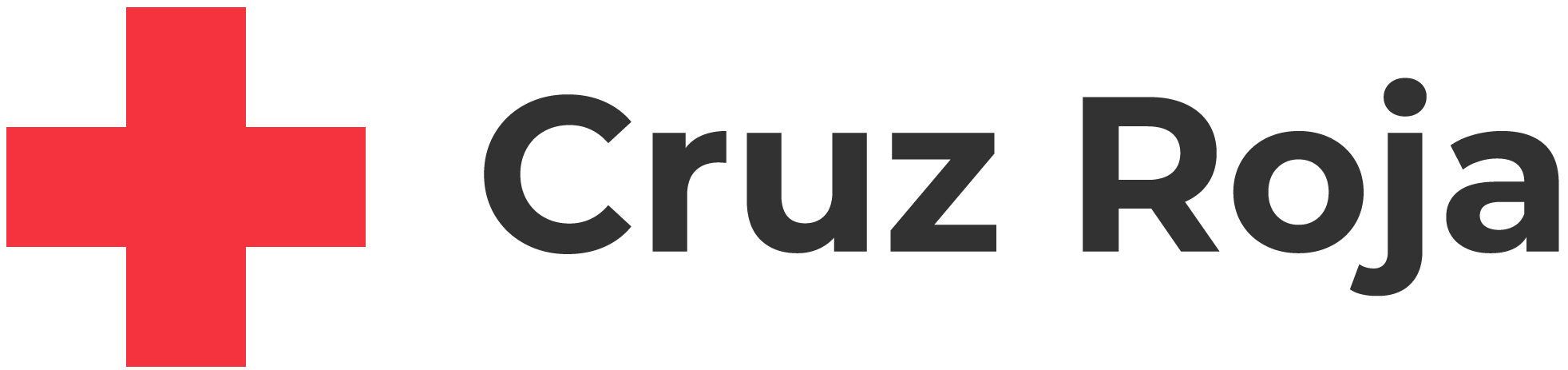
- Formation: 1864; 162 years ago
- Type: Non-profit
- Legal status: Active
- Purpose: Humanitarian
- Headquarters: Madrid
- Region served: Spain
- Members: International Red Cross and Red Crescent Movement
- Website: www.cruzroja.es

The Spanish Red Cross is the national affiliate of the International Red Cross and Red Crescent Movement and a nonprofit humanitarian institution in Spain. It was founded by Royal Order by Isabel II in the wake of the Third Carlist War.
