= Italian Red Cross =

National Red Cross Society in Italy

- Croce Rossa Italiana
- Logo of the Italian Red Cross
- Abbreviation: IRC
- Formation: 1864; 162 years ago
- Type: Association
- Purpose: Humanitarian aid
- Headquarters: Rome, Italy
- Location: Via Bernardino Ramazzini, 31 00151 Rome
- Members: International Red Cross and Red Crescent Movement
- President: Rosario Valastro
- Website: cri.it

The Italian Red Cross (IRC, Italian: Croce Rossa Italiana or CRI) is the Italian national Red Cross society. The Italian Red Cross was one of the original founding members of the International Federation of the Red Cross and Red Crescent Societies in 1919.

== History ==
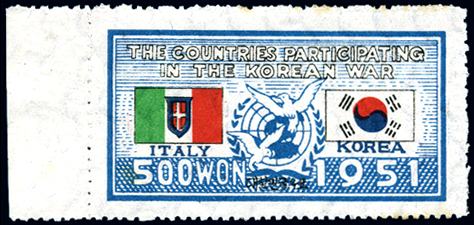
South Korean Stamp commemorating the role of the Italian Red Cross in providing medical service during the Korean War (the Korean designer of the stamp used the Kingdom of Italy flag, while Italy had been a republic, with a different flag, since 1946) 1950-1953

=== Early history ===
The present-day Italian Red Cross was founded under the name of Comitato dell'Associazione Italiana per il soccorso ai feriti ed ai malati in guerra in Milan on 15 June 1864, two months before the signing of the Geneva Convention.

On 20 June 1864, the Third Italian War of Independence broke out and four groups of IRC volunteers were sent to Custoza. In 1872, the headquarters were moved to Rome, and a Central Committee was formed. Since then, the IRC has expanded its operations throughout the entire territory of the country, and has been deployed to face a growing array of activities and emergencies, starting with the Casamicciola earthquake of 1883.

The American Red Cross has long been active in Italy, working in cooperation with the Italian Red Cross. Ernest Hemingway worked for the American Red Cross in Kingdom of Italy in 1918. The American Red Cross continues to have an office in Naples, Italy.

=== Red Cross Hospital 68 in the Korean War ===
During the Korean War, the Italian Red Cross Hospital 68 (L’OSPEDALE Croce Rossa Italiana N°68) was despatched to Korea to aid the humanitarian disaster there, even though Italy was not a member of the United Nations at the time.

The staff of hospital arrived in Korea on 16 November 1951 and provided medical service to wounded civilians and soldiers of all sides. It finally left Korea on 2 January 1955.

== Current operations ==
Presently, the Italian Red Cross has the status of a sovranational charitable organization, under the high patronage of the President of the Italian Republic. The Italian Red Cross is currently a member of the International Federation of Red Cross and Red Crescent Societies. Doctor Massimo Barra was elected President of the Italian Red Cross on 11 December 2005, and served until 30 October 2008, when the Italian Government appointed Extraordinary Commissioner Francesco Rocca. On 27 January 2013, Francesco Rocca was elected President of the IRC during the National Assembly of the organisation.

Italian Red Cross vehicles bear special license plates.

== 7 Fundamental Principles ==
The 7 Fundamental Principles are the foundation of the Italian Red Cross and International Federation of Red Cross and Red Crescent Societies:

- Humanity: "The International Red Cross and Red Crescent Movement, born of a desire to bring assistance without discrimination to the wounded on the battlefield, endeavours, in its international and national capacity, to prevent and alleviate human suffering wherever it may be found. Its purpose is to protect life and health and to ensure respect for the human being. It promotes mutual understanding, friendship, cooperation and lasting peace amongst all peoples."
- Impartiality: "It makes no discrimination as to nationality, race, religious beliefs, class or political opinions. It endeavours to relieve the suffering of individuals, being guided solely by their needs, and to give priority to the most urgent cases of distress."
- Neutrality: "In order to continue to enjoy the confidence of all, the Movement may not take sides in hostilities or engage at any time in controversies of a political, racial, religious or ideological nature."
- Independence: "The Movement is independent. The National Societies, while auxiliaries in the humanitarian services of their governments and subject to the laws of their respective countries, must always maintain their autonomy so that they may be able at all times to act in accordance with the principles of the Movement."
- Voluntary service: "It is a voluntary relief movement not prompted in any manner by desire for gain."
- Unity: "There can be only one Red Cross or one Red Crescent Society in anyone country. It must be open to all. It must carry on its humanitarian work throughout its territory."
- Universality: "The International Red Cross and Red Crescent Movement, in which all Societies have equal status and share equal responsibilities and duties in helping each other, is worldwide."
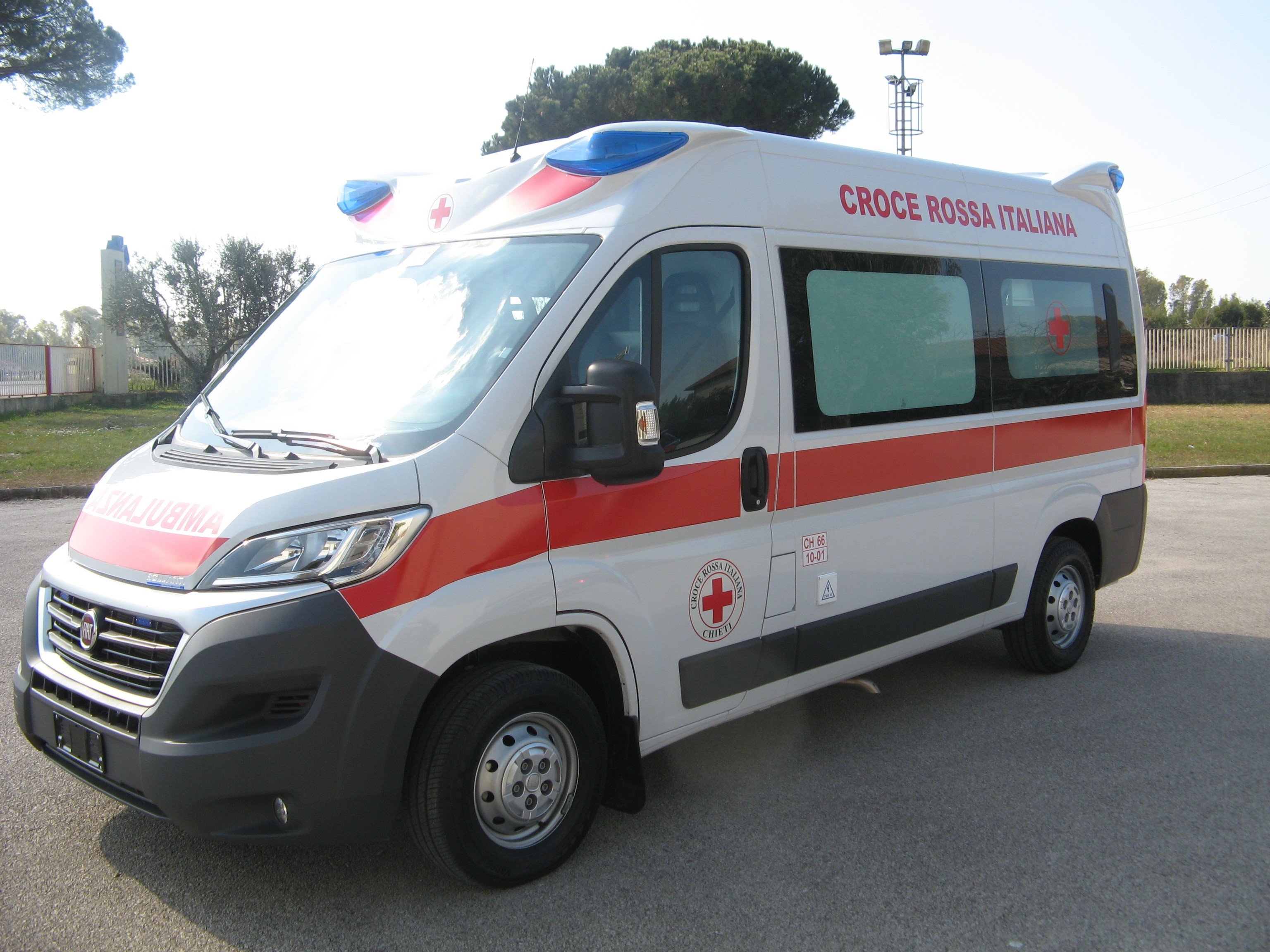
  An Italian Red Cross ambulance from Chieti

== Activities ==
The Italian Red Cross is currently conducting the 2020 Strategy promoted by the International Federation of Red Cross and Red Crescent Societies. The main aim of this project is to reach, during this decade, six objectives based on the analysis of the needs and vulnerabilities of the community. The six strategic objectives are the following:

1. Safeguard and protect health and life;
2. Encourage support and social inclusion;
3. Prepare the community and respond to emergencies and disasters;
4. Spread the International Humanitarian Law (IHL), the Fundamental Principles and the Humanitarian Values. Cooperate with the other members of the International Red Cross and Red Crescent Movement;
5. Promote youths development and a culture of active citizenship;
6. Operate with a capillary, efficient and conspicuous structure, treasuring the activity of volunteers.

== Components ==
Since the 2012 reform, the Italian Red Cross is made up of three components:

- Corpo Militare (Ausiliario delle Forze Armate) - Military Corps (Auxiliary of the Armed Forces)
- Corpo delle Infermiere Volontarie (Ausiliarie delle Forze Armate) - Voluntary nurses (Auxiliary of the Armed Forces)
- Volontari della Croce Rossa Italiana (Componente Civile) - Volunteers of the Italian Red Cross (Civilians)
