= Chilean Red Cross =

Organization

- Founded: December 18, 1903
- Type: Non-profit organisation
- Purpose: Humanitarian Aid
- Location: Chile
- Affiliations: International Committee of the Red Cross; International Federation of Red Cross and Red Crescent Societies
- Website: https://www.ifrc.org/national-societies-directory/chilean-red-cross

The Chilean Red Cross Society was founded in 1903. It is headquartered in Santiago. It was incorporated by law in 1923. Chilean Red Cross volunteers are among the first responders to volcano eruptions and other natural disasters in Chile.
