= Czech Red Cross =

Organization

- Founded: June 5, 1993
- Type: Non-profit organisation
- Purpose: Humanitarian Aid
- Location: Czech Republic
- Affiliations: International Committee of the Red Cross; International Federation of Red Cross and Red Crescent Societies
- Website: https://zvladnesto.cervenykriz.eu/en/home/

The Czech Red Cross Society was founded in 1993, following the dissolution of Czechoslovakia. It is headquartered in Prague.

== History ==
The Czechoslovak Red Cross was founded on 6 February, 1919.
