= Mali Red Cross =

Humanitarian organization in Mali

- Founded: 1965
- Type: Non-profit organisation
- Purpose: Humanitarian Aid
- Location: Mali
- Affiliations: International Committee of the Red Cross; International Federation of Red Cross and Red Crescent Societies

Mali Red Cross, also known as CRM, (French: Croix-Rouge Malienne) was founded in 1965 on the basis of the Geneva Conventions of August 1949 and of the order of 59 PCG 28 March 1959 governing associations and NGOs in the Republic of Mali. It is headquartered in Bamako. The primary goal of the Mali Red Cross is to provide aid to people suffering the combined effects of armed conflict, promote nutrition and health, and provide assistance during food shortages. The International Federation of Red Cross and Red Crescent Societies (IFRC) recognized the Mali Red Cross on September 14, 1967, as the 109 national society of the Red Cross and Red Crescent Societies.

== 2014 kidnapping ==
On February 8, 2014, five Malian humanitarian workers, four of them whom were Mali Red Cross workers, were reported missing by the IFRC. Reportedly, the humanitarian workers were traveling on a road between the northern towns of Kidal and Gao in Northern Mali before their disappearance. The abductions led to a temporary suspension in the movement of Mali Red Cross staff members in the northern region. On February 11, an Islamist militant group, the Movement for Oneness and Jihad in West Africa, or MUJAO, claimed responsibility for the kidnapping of the five Malian workers. On April 17, 2014, a news release by the Bamako-based IFRC reported that the abducted Mali Red Cross workers had been freed during an undisclosed military operation conducted by French military forces. Two of the workers suffered minor injuries. The remaining three went unharmed.

== 2014 Ebola response ==
The first case of the Ebola virus disease in Mali was detected in October 2014. In response, the Mali Red Cross in collaboration with the IFRC and other healthcare organizations throughout Mali launched an Ebola operation in order to combat and prevent the possibility of an Ebola outbreak. With only a total of eight cases that resulted in six deaths, the response was relatively successful. Mali was declared Ebola-free on January 18, 2015.

== Statistics ==
In 2014, the Mali Red Cross distributed over 15,000 tons of food, provided access to drinking water for 240,000 people, and secured 4,100 detainee visits.
