= Netherlands Red Cross =

Dutch humanitarian organization

- Het Nederlandse Rode Kruis
- Established: 1867 (159 years ago)
- Region served: Netherlands
- Parent organization: International Red Cross and Red Crescent Movement
- Website: www.rodekruis.nl

The Netherlands Red Cross (Dutch: Rode Kruis) was founded in 1867. It is among the Red Cross and Red Crescent Societies. It adopts branch governance structure which leads to approximately 214 branches that enables it to serve the whole country.

It is run by paid staff at the national and district level in collaboration with 17,000 volunteers who are distributed all over the Netherlands. The organization's efforts are financed by 450,000 contributing affiliates and donors, who make available monetary help frequently. Its revenue in 2006 was €58.8 million.

== History ==
In 1862, "A Memory of Solferino" appeared, in which Swiss businessman Jean Henri Dunant recounted what he had found after the Battle of Solferino: a battlefield with 40,000 wounded soldiers, left unkempt by the armies that had fought there. The Dutch army doctor Johan Basting translated the book in early 1863 and was received by Queen Mother Anna Pavlovna and Prince Frederik. In October of that year, Basting was delegated to the international conference in Geneva, but without a mandate. The Dutch government was very reticent in matters pertaining to international politics. In November 1864 it did sign the First Geneva Convention on the treatment of wounded and prisoners of war and the status of neutral aid workers. Basting, meanwhile, continued to strive for a national organization, such as had already been created in a number of countries.

On July 19, 1867, King Willem III signed the Royal Decree no. 60 at Het Loo Palace, the first article of which reads: “There shall be a Nederlandsche Vereeniging to provide aid to sick and wounded soldiers in time of war, whether the Netherlands is involved or not.”

The first Main Committee and the first honorary members were appointed by Royal Decree of July 31, 1867, no 71. These honorary members were: Henri Dunant, Lieutenant Colonel W.J. Button, Dr. J.H.Ch. Basting and the former naval officer C.W.M. van de Velde. The first chairman was Prof. Dr. J. Bosscha (1867-1872).
