= Austrian Red Cross =

Austrian branch of the International Red Cross and Red Crescent Movement

- Österreichisches Rotes Kreuz
- Formation: March 14, 1880; 146 years ago
- Headquarters: Vienna, Austria
- Region served: Austria
- President: Gerald Schöpfer
- Main organ: General Assembly
- Parent organization: International Federation of Red Cross and Red Crescent Societies
- Website: www.roteskreuz.at

The Austrian Red Cross (German: Österreichisches Rotes Kreuz, ÖRK) is the national Red Cross Organization in Austria and is part of the International Red Cross and Red Crescent Movement. It was established on March 14, 1880, by Doctor Adam Lichtenheld of the Vienna General Hospital and is the biggest aid agency in the country.

== Duties ==
Its duties contain:

- Emergency medical services and transport services, apart from other NPOs (such as the Arbeiter-Samariter-Bund)
- Blood donation-service – 95% of the donated blood is provided by the Red Cross
- Social- and healthcare programs
- Development Cooperation, Rehabilitation and Emergency Aid
- Educational service (first aid courses)
- International Tracing Service – After World War II, and nowadays after big disasters.
- Supervision of international humanitarian law

By far, most staff members are volunteers (about 74.000 in 2018), but there are professional employees as well as drafted Zivildiener, which are conscientious objectors forced to serve up to nine months time in medical service, instead of military service.

== Presidents of the ÖRK ==
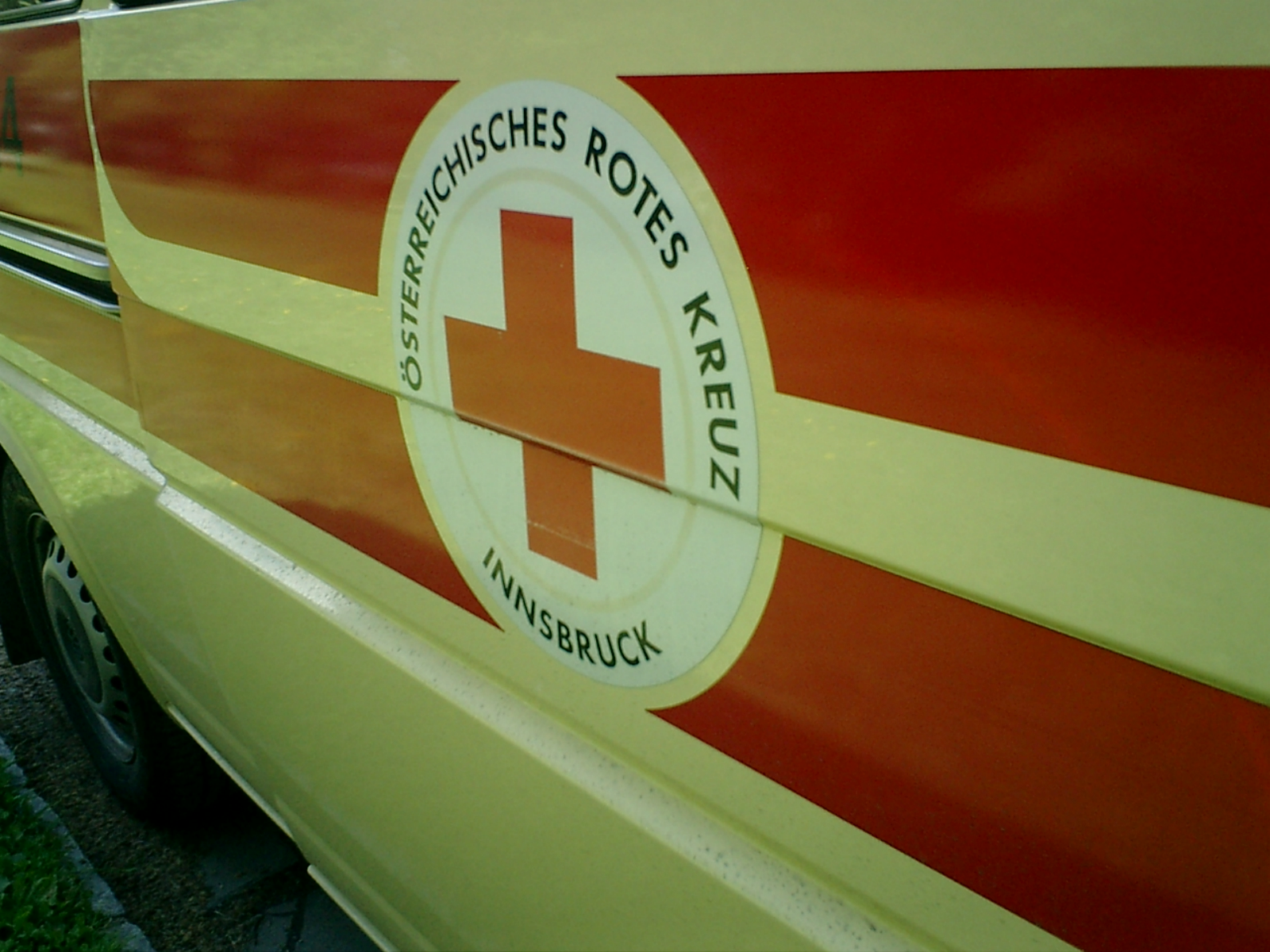
Emblem of the Austrian Red Cross in Innsbruck

- Karl Baron of Tinti (1880–1884)
- Franz Earl Falkenhayn (1885–1898)
- Prince Alois von Schönburg-Hartenstein (1899–1913)
- Rudolf Earl of Abensperg-Traun (1913–1919)
- Max Vladimir Eck (1919–1938)
- Adolf Pilz (1945)
- Karl Seitz (1946–1950)
- Burghard Breitner (1950–1956)
- Hans Lauda (1956–1974)
- Heinrich Treichl (1974–1999)
- Fredy Mayer (1999-2013)
- Gerald Schöpfer (since 2013)

== National organisation ==
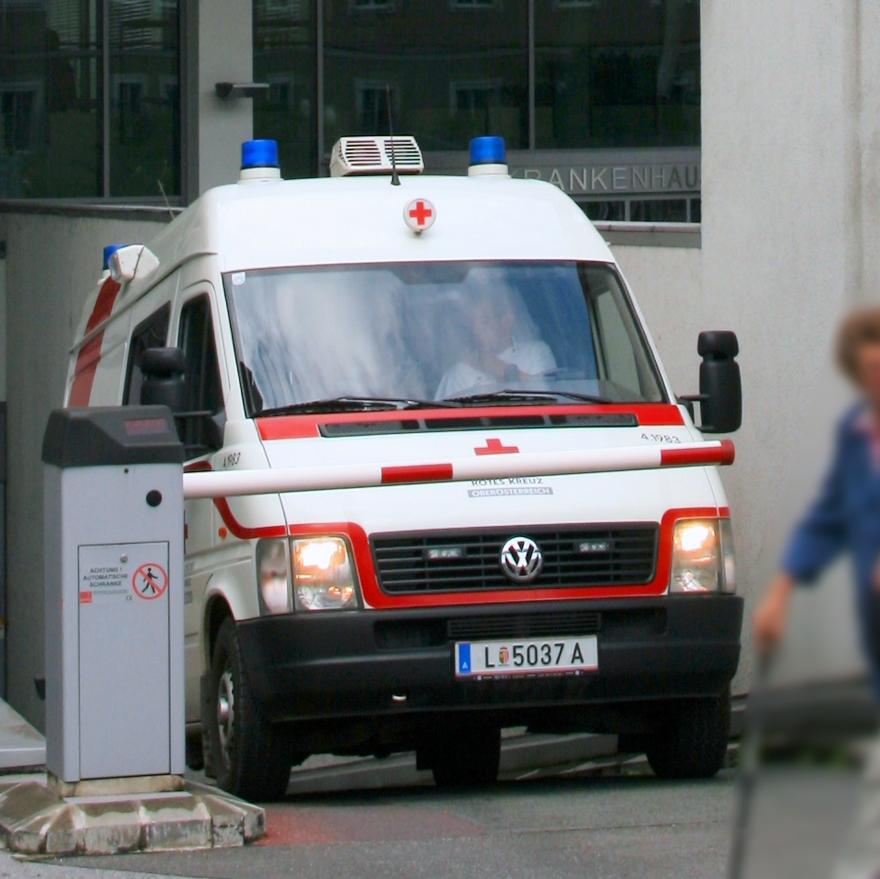
Ambulance of Lower Austria Red Cross in Linz

The organisation persists of nine subordinate national organisations, all are their own entities but are bound to the basic principles of the Austrian Red Cross. This has historical reasons, the national organisation originated out of many small, local aid organisations.

- National Association Burgenland
- National Association Carinthia
- National Association Lower Austria
- National Association Upper Austria
- National Association Salzburg
- National Association Styria
- National Association Tyrol
- National Association Vorarlberg
- National Association Vienna

These consist of totally 142 district offices and 956 local offices.
