= Belgian Red Cross =

Humanitarian organization

- Croix-Rouge de Belgique; Belgische Rode Kruis; Belgisches Rotes Kreuz
- International logo of the Flemish Red Cross (using the name Belgian Red Cross)

- Official insignia of the Belgian Red Cross
- Formation: February 4, 1864; 162 years ago
- Founded at: Brussels
- VAT ID no.: BE0406729809
- Registration no.: 0406729809
- Legal status: Non-Governmental Organisation
- Headquarters: Brussels, Belgium
- Subsidiaries: Rode Kruis-Vlaanderen
- Affiliations: International Federation of Red Cross and Red Crescent Societies
- Volunteers: 24.340 (2023)
- Website: www.rodekruis.be

The Belgian Red Cross is a humanitarian organization that aids in providing emergency and disaster related services and relief as well as providing education for disaster awareness within the population of Belgium. It is a member of the International Federation of Red Cross and Red Crescent Societies.

== Mission ==
The mission of the Belgian Red Cross follows the same guidelines and principles of all International Red Cross and Red Crescent Movement organizations: to prevent medical, psychological, and sociological problems and crisis. The Belgian Red Cross aims to aid in resolving such problems and issues through the implementation of trainings, educational development, and through the overall assistance and presence of Red Cross members in times of turmoil. The members of this organization believe in the strength of social bonds amongst individuals as being the greatest preventative measure against isolation and marginalization.

== History ==
The Belgian Red Cross was established on February 4, 1864, by Doctor Andrea Wegner. Its headquarters are in Brussels, Belgium.

=== Rode Kruis-Vlaanderen ===
This is a Flemish independent volunteer based organization under the umbrella of The Belgian Red Cross and is a connected member of the International Red Cross and the Red Crescent Movement. The mission of this umbrella organization is best divided into three parts.

1. The first mission is to provide protection and defend the interests of the respected populations, both in their homes and when abroad.
2. The second part of this organization's mission statement is to encourage and teach self-reliance skills in order to best be proactive in the planning of an emergency.
3. The third is being proactive in the organization of the supply of blood and other medical supplies in order to be able to provide the necessary care for the individuals in need.

The assistance from volunteers is what heavily drives this organization, and is the foundation on which it practices.

=== Croix-Rouge de Belgique communauté Francophone ===
This is a French-speaking Belgian branch of the Red Cross. This subsidiary organization of the Belgian Red Cross is also like Rode Kruis-Vlaanderens as it is a connected member of the International Red Cross and the Red Crescent Movement. The mission of this Belgian Red Cross branch are as follows:

- To prevent psycho-social and medical crises and aid in solving them through the implementation of trainings, education, and physical presence in the environment.
- Reduce the risk and effects of isolation and marginalization by working with individuals to learn how to best strengthen the communicative and social bonds between themselves and others.
- Provide and foster respect for cultural diversity in order to encourage tolerance of others.
- Fulfill the missions mandated by the public authorities, and respect the founding values of the organization.

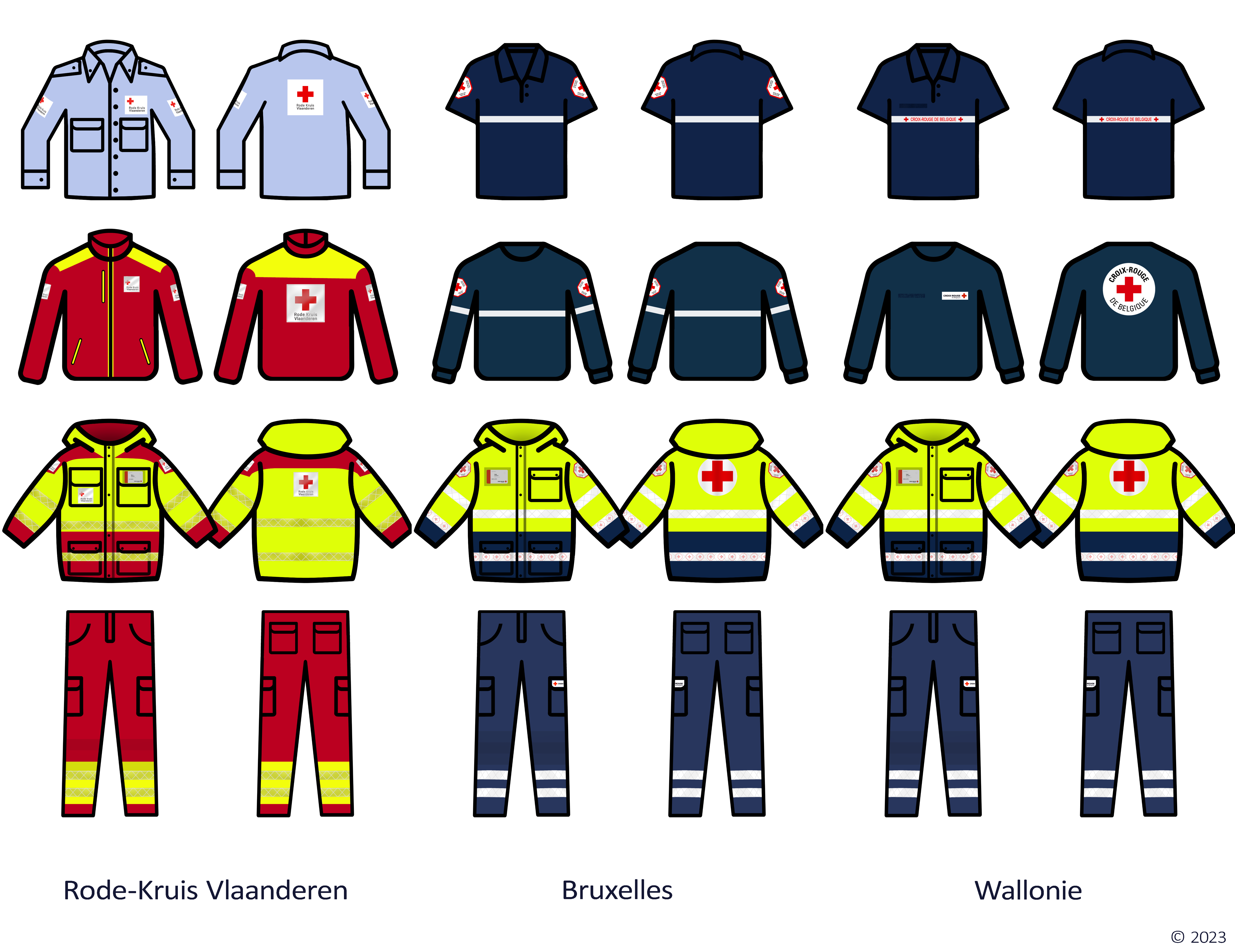
Standard uniforms of the Belgian Red Cross for the three regions of Belgium.

=== Museum of Remembrance ===
At the Flanders Fields Museum in Ypres, Belgium, the world can reflect and remember the First World War, and the role that the Red Cross played during this wartime. It was created by the ICRC (International Committee of the Red Cross) Delegation to the EU (European Union), NATO (North Atlantic Treaty Organization) and the Kingdom of Belgium and the Belgian Red Cross. The exhibit features the work both back during the war and currently; which allows the common eye to see the semblance that much of it has. In this exhibit visitors can look up if any of their ancestors or relatives were registered as a Prisoner of War during '14-18'. This exhibit was open to the public eye for viewing until the end of December 2014.

== Services and projects ==
On March 22, 2016, the Belgian Red Cross sent approximately 400 people to respond to the bombings in Brussels. They sent 30 ambulances to the Zaventem Airport and Maelbeek metro station. They transported over 100 wounded individuals to over 16 different hospitals to gain medical care.

=== Reuniting family members ===
One of the mission projects of the various umbrella organizations of the Belgian Red Cross is providing assistance in helping individuals reunite and find their family members. The Belgian Red Cross aids in providing resources for people to find their family members that may be lost or missing as a result of some of the following factors: violent situations and armed conflict, man-made or natural disasters, migration, war (e.g., World War II), or any other situations of humanitarian need.
