= Saleema Rehman =

Afghan doctor (born 1990s)

- Born: 1991 or 1992 (age 34–35); Swabi, Khyber Pakhtunkhwa
- Education: Rawalpindi Medical University
- Known for: First female Afghan Turkmen physician
- Awards: Nansen Refugee Award for Asia (2021)

Saleema Rehman (born 1991 or 1992) is an Afghan refugee medical doctor living in Pakistan. She is the first female Afghan Turkmen physician.

== Early life and education ==
Rehman is of Afghan Turkmen ethnicity, and was born in 1991 or 1992 in a refugee camp in Swabi, Khyber Pakhtunkhwa, Pakistan after her parents had fled from Afghanistan in 1979 during the Soviet–Afghan War. Her great-grandfather had also been a refugee, fleeing from Turkmenistan to northern Afghanistan in 1917 during the Russian Revolution. Her birth was complicated and medical assistance was limited, so the child was not expected to survive. Her father Abdul, a day-labourer, resolved that if she survived he would help her to get an education and become a doctor.

She was one of a small group of refugee girls in her class at primary school in Attock, near Islamabad, and, as a refugee, found it difficult to move on to higher education but eventually in 2009 won the single place reserved for a refugee at Rawalpindi Medical University, for her medical training. Throughout, she had to go against the norms of her culture which did not expect women to become educated or to have ambitions beyond carpet-weaving and marriage.

== Career ==
Rehman's first post was at the Holy Family Hospital, Rawalpindi, where her patients included both refugees and local residents. She decided to specialise in gynaecology, and again won the only training place available for a refugee, at Holy Family. During her training the hospital became a COVID-19 response centre and she was working with women who were giving birth while suffering from Covid. After qualification she had further difficulties in getting a licence to practice, because of her refugee status, but she was finally able to open a private clinic in Attock in June 2021. The clinic offers free care for refugee women.

Rehman is the first female medical doctor from the Afghan Turkmen community.

In January 2022 she was one of the speakers at a United Nations web event launching humanitarian appeals for Afghanistan and its region, along with Martin Griffiths, the Under-Secretary-General for Humanitarian Affairs and Emergency Relief Coordinator, and Filippo Grandi, the United Nations High Commissioner for Refugees.

== Recognition ==
She was the Asian regional winner of the UNHCR's Nansen Refugee Award for 2021. The award was presented in September 2021 at the Swiss Embassy in Islamabad, by the Swiss Ambassador Bénédict de Cerjat, and the Chargée d'affaires of Norway, Elin Kylvåg.
