= Bertschinger =

Bertschinger is a surname, possibly of Swiss German origin. Notable people with the surname include:

- Claire Bertschinger, Anglo-Swiss nurse
- Edmund Bertschinger, American theoretical astrophysicist and cosmologist
- Marie-Louise Bertschinger (c1910-1970), Swiss humanitarian
- Sara Bertschinger, American politician
