= List of Nansen Refugee Award recipients =

Annual award issued by UNHCR

Nansen Refugee Award
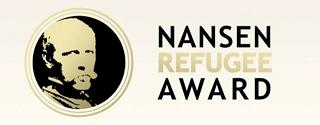
- Logo
- Awarded for: Outstanding service to the cause of refugees
- Location: Geneva
- Presented by: United Nations High Commissioner for Refugees
- Reward: US$150,000
- First award: 1954
- Website: www.unhcr.org/nansen
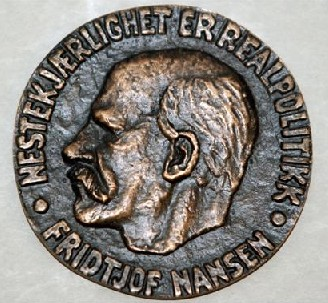
- The top of the Nansen Medal reads: "Nestekjærlighet er Realpolitik" (English: Altruism is Practical Politics)

The Nansen Refugee Award is a medal issued annually by the United Nations High Commissioner for Refugees (UNHCR) to an individual, group or organisation in recognition of outstanding service to the cause of refugees, displaced or stateless people. The award was established by UNHCR the organisation's first High Commissioner, Gerrit Jan van Heuven Goedhart, in 1954 as a tribute to Fridtjof Nansen. Fridtjof Nansen was a Nobel Peace Prize laureate, explorer and League of Nations High Commissioner for Refugees and the award was established in honour of his work to support refugees. Van Heuven Goedhart felt that creating an award would increase the world's attention to the needs of refugees and increase global refugee aid.

The inaugural awardee was Eleanor Roosevelt in 1954. Every year, the prize is presented at a ceremony in the Bâtiment des Forces Motrices, in Geneva. The medal is accompanied by a US$150,000 prize. The award was expanded in 2017 to include regional winners for Africa, Asia, the Americas, the Middle East and Europe.

In 2018, the award was described as the "other Nobel" prize by NPR.

== List of annual laureates ==
List of annual laureates
Year	Image	Laureate	Country	Office held, or rationale (Note: Official rationale for the award are not always provided by UNHCR. In such circumstances, this column broadly outlines the relevant work of the recipient.)	Ref.
1954	Black and white image of Eleanor Roosevelt smiling	Eleanor Roosevelt	USA	as "the first chair of the UN Human Rights Commission"	
1955	Black and white image portret Koningin Juliana	Queen Juliana	Netherlands	as Queen of Netherlands	
1956		Dorothy D. Houghton	USA	as "president of the Federation of Women's Clubs, delegate to the Geneva conferences of the Intergovernmental Committee for European Migration and director of the Office of Refugees Migration and Voluntary Assistance"	
1956	van Heuven Goedhart wearing a dark jacket, white shirt, dark tie	Gerrit Jan van Heuven Goedhart	Netherlands	United Nations High Commissioner for Refugees (1951 to 1956); awarded posthumously	
1957		The League of Red Cross Societies	Switzerland	for its work on behalf of the Hungarian refugees	
1958		David Hoggett	United Kingdom	for work with Hungarian refugees in Austria	
1958	Jacobsen portrait in which he is looking at the camera emotionless, his hair is slicked back to one side	Pierre Jacobsen	France	Deputy Director of the Intergovernmental Committee for European Migration; awarded posthumously	
1959		Oskar Helmer	Austria	outstanding work on behalf of refuges...was Austrian Minister of the Interior in 1956 when 180,000 Hungarians took refuge in Austria	
1960	Chataway candidly smiling, wearing a pin-striped jacket, white shirt, dark tie. He is clean shaven and hair styled in side parting	Christopher Chataway, Colin Jones, Trevor Philpott, Timothy Raison	United Kingdom	For their roles in creating World Refugee Year, raising £9 million	
1961	King Olav dressed in military regalia, looking to the side with a row of medals pinned to his jacket, adorned with a sash and epaulettes	King Olav V	Norway	King of Norway	
1962		Tasman Heyes	Australia	a tribute not only to an able and far-sighted friend of refugees, but also to the generosity of his countrymen	
1963		The International Council for Voluntary Agencies	Switzerland	for support to refugees in Africa	
1964		May Curwen	United Kingdom	her "whole life had been devoted to the service of those in need"	
1964		Francois Preziosi & Jean Plicque	France	For their refugee-support work in eastern Congo; awarded posthumously	
1965		Lucie Chevalley	France	for "exceptional service she has rendered to the cause of refugees in France and in a number of other European countries during the past forty-five years"	
1965		Ana Rosa Schlieper de Martínez Guerrero	Argentina	for being "associated with many charitable societies and institutions and was a staunch supporter of human rights"; awarded posthumously	
1965		Jørgen Nørredam	Denmark	for "dedicated service to refugees in Europe, North, Central and East Africa for many years"; awarded posthumously	
1967	Prince Bernhard is wearing a dark jacket, with a carnation on it, a red tie, grey/brown shirt. He has a slight smile and is wearing spectacles.	Prince Bernhard	Netherlands		
1968		Bernard Arcens	Senegal		
1968		Charles H. Jordan	USA	awarded posthumously	
1969		Princess Princep Shah	Nepal		
1971		Louise Holborn	USA		
1972		Swana Friðriksdóttir	Iceland		
1974		Helmut Frenz	Germany		
1975		James J. Norris	USA		
1976		Olav Hodne	Norway		
1976		Marie-Louise Bertschinger	Switzerland	awarded posthumously	
1977	The Malaysian Red Crescent Society logo, incorporating a red crescent on a white background	The Malaysian Red Crescent Society	Malaysia	MRC efforts in aiding thousands of refugees who arrived in Malaysia as a result of the conflict in Indo-China	
1978		Seretse Khama	Botswana		
1979	A candid head shot of Valéry Giscard d'Estaing who is looking neutral, wearing a dark jacket, dark tie and a white formal shirt with darker vertical stripes.	Valéry Giscard d'Estaing	France		
1980		Maryluz Schloeter Paredes	Venezuela		
1981		Paul Cullen	Australia		
1982	Crown Princess Sonja outdoors, dressed in dark blue, with a gold necklace.	Crown Princess Sonja	Norway		
1983	Candid shot of Mwalimu Julius Kambarage Nyerere looking just past the camera, speaking, wearing a formal jacket.	Mwalimu Julius Kambarage Nyerere	Tanzania		
1984		Lewis M. Hiller, Jeff Kass, and Gregg Turay	USA		
1985	Arms wearing a dark jacket, white shirt, dark tie and thick spectacles.	Paulo Evaristo Arns	Brazil		
1986	Governor General Jeanne Sauvé dressed formally in a dark jacket.	The People of Canada (accepted by Governor General Jeanne Sauvé)	Canada		
1987	King Carlos in a grey jacket, light blue shirt, yellow tie, standing indoors in front of the Spanish flag	Juan Carlos I	Spain		
1988		Syed Munir Husain	Pakistan		
1991	Libertina Appolus Amathila in a red formal jacket, surrounded by people, looking up from a folded document.	Libertina Appolus Amathila	Namibia		
1991		Paul Weis	Austria	awarded posthumously	
1992	Formal photograph of Richard von Weizsäcker wearing a jacket and tie with a black background.	Richard von Weizsäcker	Germany		
1993	The logo of Médecins Sans Frontières, red stripes approximately appearing like a person.	Médecins Sans Frontières	Switzerland		
1995	Graça Machel dressed formally in a black jacket, wearing a pearl necklace, speaking on a podium.	Graça Machel	Mozambique		
1996	Handicap International's modern logo, with the words of the new name humanity & inclusion, the logo is a blue hand symbol with the word "Hi" in it.	Handicap International	France		
1997		Joannes Klas	USA		
1998	Mustafa Dzhemilev dressed in a dark jacket, white shirt and blue tie, listening to a translation headset.	Mustafa Dzhemilev	Ukraine		
2000		Jelena Silajdžić	Bosnia and Herzegovina		
2000	Abune Paulos dressed in religious ceremonial garb including mitre that is red with an abundance of gold. He is holding a staff and golden processional cross.	Abune Paulos	Ethiopia		
2000	Mong Hay standing in a street. He is bald with a long white bear and wearing a collared, short sleeved shirt with a pen and smart phone in the pocket.	Lao Mong Hay	Cambodia		
2000	Miguel Angel Estrella candidly wearing a huge grin.	Miguel Angel Estrella	Argentina		
2000	The United Nations Volunteers very simple logo	United Nations volunteers	United Nations		
2001	Pavarotti in a black bowtie, a white brimmed hat, a colourful scarf and a big smile.	Luciano Pavarotti	Italy		
2002	The MV Tampa vessel, a large container-cargo ship with a red hull in a harbour.	Arne Rinnan and the crew of the MV Tampa	Norway		
2003		Annalena Tonelli	Italy		
2004		Memorial Human Rights Centre	Russia		
2005	Marguerite Barankitse in a colourful skirt and headdress, and a red jacket. She is speaking on a stage as part of a panel discussion.	Marguerite Barankitse	Burundi		
2006		Akio Kanai	Japan		
2007		Katrine Camilleri	Malta		
2008		Chris Clark & United Nations Mine Action Service	United Kingdom		
2009	Kennedy in a dark jacket and white short and dark tie looking at the photographer neutrally.	Edward Kennedy	USA		
2010		Alixandra Fazzina	United Kingdom		
2011		Society for Humanitarian Solidarity	Yemen		
2012	Mohamed wearing a dark hijab and spectacles	Hawa Aden Mohamed	Somalia		
2013	Angélique Namaika smiling in a village, wearing a green shirt and brown headdress.	Angélique Namaika	Democratic Republic of the Congo		
2014		Butterflies with New Wings Building a Future	Colombia		
2015	Aqeela Asifi wearing a black head scarf and speaking on stage at a United Nation's event	Aqeela Asifi	Afghanistan		
2016	The Hellenic Rescue Team crest, a black eagle in front of a red cross, over white mountains.	Efi Latsoudi & Konstantinos Mitragas	Greece		
2017		Zannah Mustapha	Nigeria		
2018		Evan Atar Adaha	South Sudan		
2019	Azizbek Ashurov in 2022	Azizbek Ashurov	Kyrgyzstan		
2020		Mayerlín Vergara Pérez	Colombia		
2021		Jeel Albena Association for Humanitarian Development	Yemen		
2022	Formal portrait of Angela Merkel looking neutral in a red jacket with gold simple necklace	Angela Merkel	Germany		
2023		Abdullahi Mire	Somalia	For his work to expand educational opportunities for young refugees	
2024	portrait of Rosita Milesi	Rosita Milesi	Brazil		
2025		Martin Azia Sodea	Cameroon		

== Lists of regional laureates ==
List of regional laureates
Year	Region	Image	Laureate	Rationale	Country	Ref.
2017	Africa		CIYOTA		Uganda	
2017	Asia		Bernard Wirth		Thailand	
2017	Americas		Friar Tomas		Mexico	
2017	Europe		Hej Främling!		Sweden	
2017	Middle East		Ihsan Ezedeen		Syria	
2018	Asia	Tuenjai Deetes shaking hands with a woman at an event, smiling, wearing a pink jacket and scarf.	Tuenjai Deetes		Thailand	
2018	Americas		Samira Harnish		USA	
2018	Europe		Andreas Hollstein and the town of Altena		Germany	
2018	Middle East		Reclaim Childhood		Jordan	
2019	Africa		Evariste Mfaume		Democratic Republic of the Congo	
2019	Asia		Alberto Cairo		Afghanistan	
2019	Americas		Bianka Rodriguez		El Salvador	
2019	Europe		Humanitarian Corridors		Italy	
2019	Middle East		Abeer Khreisha		Jordan	
2020	Africa		Sabuni Francoise Chikunda		Democratic Republic of the Congo	
2020	Asia		Rozma Ghafouri		Afghanistan	
2020	Europe		Tetiana Barantsova		Ukraine	
2020	Middle East	Rana Dajani smiling in a pink hijab in a meeting room.	Rana Dajani		Jordan	
2021	Africa		Roukiatou Maiga		Burkina Faso	
2021	Africa		Diambendi Madiega		Burkina Faso	
2021	Asia		Saleema Rehman		Afghanistan	
2021	Americas		Santiago Ávila		Honduras	
2021	Europe		Nikola Kovačević		Serbia	
2022	Africa		Ahmedou Ag Albohary		Mauritania	
2022	Asia		Naw Bway Khu		Myanmar	
2022	Americas		Vicenta González		Nicaragua	
2022	Middle East		Nagham Hasan		Iraq	
2023	Americas		Elizabeth Moreno Barco		Colombia	
2023	Asia-Pacific		Abdullah Habib, Shahida Win, Sahat Zia, and Salim Khan		Bangladesh	
2023	Europe		Lena Grochowska and Władysław Grochowski		Poland	
2023	Middle East & North Africa		Asia Al-Mashreqi		Yemen	
2024	Africa		Maimouna Ba		Burkina Faso	
2024	Asia-Pacific		Deepti Gurung		Nepal	
2024	Europe		Jin Davod		Turkey	
2024	Middle East & North Africa		Nada Fadol		Egypt	
2025	Americas		Pablo Moreno Cadena		Mexico	
2025	Asia-Pacific		Negara Nazari		Afghanistan	
2025	Europe		Proliska		Ukraine	
2025	Middle East & North Africa		Taban Shoresh		United Kingdom Iraq	

== See also ==
- Nansen International Office for Refugees
