= Konstantinos Mitragas =

Greek businessperson and humanitarian

Konstantinos Mitragas is a Greek businessman, sea captain and the secretary-general of the Hellenic Rescue Team that supports refugees arriving in Lesvos. He collected the Nansen Refugee Award in 2016 on behalf of the Hellenic Rescue Team.

== Career ==
Mitragas is a Thessaloniki-based business man, a sea captain, and the volunteer secretary-general of the Hellenic Rescue Team. Mitragas and his team support Syrian, Afghan, and Iraqi refugees arriving in at Lesvos, Greece.

In 2016, he collected the Nansen Refugee Award in on behalf of the team, as a result of their 2015 work during the European migrant crisis. The award was also shared with Efi Latsoudi of Pikpa camp.

== Personal life ==
Mitragas has two children.
