= Zannah Mustapha =

Zannah Mustapha may refer to:

- Zannah Mustapha (educator)
- Zannah Mustapha (politician)
