= Francois Preziosi =

French diplomat, killed in 1964

- Born: 1921 or 1922; France
- Died: 17 Aug 1964; Kalehe Territory, Democratic Republic of the Congo
- Cause of death: Murder
- Citizenship: France
- Occupation: UNHCR official
- Awards: Nansen Refugee Award

Francois Preziosi (1921/1922 to 1964) was a United Nations High Commissioner for Refugees official who was killed in the Democratic Republic of the Congo by rebel forces in the midst of the Congo Crisis. He was posthumously awarded the Nansen Refugee Award in 1964.

== Career ==
From 1951 to 1956 Preziosi was the Social Affairs Adviser with the United Nations Korean Reconstruction Agency.

In 1964, he was stationed in the Democratic Republic of the Congo, working for the United Nations High Commissioner for Refugees on development projects to support Tutsi refugees.

== Death ==
On August 17, 1964, Preziosi travelled to Kalehe to visit Tutsi refugees who had fled Rwanda to Congo, a 33 year old International Labour Organization colleague Jean Plicque volunteered to join the trip just before departure. Preziosi was on a mission to discourage Tutsi refugees from collaborating with Congolese rebels, in the hope of improving their treatment from local authorities. Both men were being driven by George Yogolero, a Congolese driver.

They had been discouraged from travelling by the Mwami of nearby Kalonge, who warned the men against the trip and of collaboration between Congolese rebels and the Tutsi refugees. The Mwami's perceptions of collaboration were a factor in the poor treatment of the refugees by the Mwami and the local community.

Upon arrival in Kalehe, the car was met by a detachment of Congolese rebels with their commander and a senior officer. Driver Yogolero waved a white handkerchief, and the leader of the detachment ordered Plicque, Preziosi, Yogolero, and the Mwami's representative out of the car. Both Frenchmen were promptly murdered. Yogolero was stabbed in the arm, but escaped along with the Mwami's representative.

Initial press reports relied exclusively on the verbal testimony of George Yogolero who stated that both rebels and refugees attacked the men, however subsequent investigations by Warren A. Pinegar of UNHCR concluded that the rebels perpetrated the violence, as most refugees unsuccessfully plead for the lives of Plicque and Preziosi to be spared. Unbeknown to Plicque and Preziosi at the time, they arrived just as the rebels were finishing trying to unsuccessfully persuade the Tutsi refugees to collaborate with them.

Preziosi was 43 at the time of his death.

== Family life ==
Preziosi was married. His wife had been evacuated from the Democratic Republic of the Congo to Bujumbura in Burundi just before his death.

== Aftermath ==
United Nations Secretary-General U Thant expressed outrage about the murders.

The Congolese Army recovered the men's bodies which were found with wedding rings on their fingers. The presence of valuable wedding rings led the UNHCR officials to believe that they were immediately buried by the Tutsi rebels. A funeral was held for both men on 31 August 1964 in Bukavu cathedral.

Preziosi was posthumously awarded the Nansen Refugee Award (for Outstanding service to the cause of refugees) in 1964.

== See also ==
- Rwandan revolution (1959 to 1961)
- United Nations Operation in the Congo
