= Gohar Nazir Gohar =

Gohar Nazir Gohar (Urdu: پیرڈاکٹر گوہر نظیر گوہر) is a Pakistani physician

== Education and training ==
Gohar Nazir received his primary education at Presentation Convent School in Murree. He completed his secondary education at Aitchison College, Lahore, obtaining his matriculation in 1983 and completing his FSc in 1985–86. He was also recognized as the Best All-Round Leaving Cadet in 1985–86.

He earned his MBBS degree from Rawalpindi Medical College, now known as Rawalpindi Medical University. He subsequently received training in diagnostic ultrasonography in Lahore and became a Fellow of the Toranomon Institute of Diagnostic Ultrasound. He also completed a Master of Public Health (MPH) from Pak-Aims in Lahore and undertook further advanced ultrasound training through MAIUM in Australia.

He has also been awarded honorary membership of the American College of Physicians (ACP).

== Medical and social activities ==
Gohar Nazir is a medical doctor who earned his MBBS degree from Rawalpindi Medical College, now known as Rawalpindi Medical University. In 2020, national media described him as both a religious scholar and medical doctor and reported his involvement in a national hygiene campaign during the COVID-19 pandemic. According to the report, he used social media to promote government health and hygiene measures and discussed cleanliness from both medical and religious perspectives.

A free medical facility operates at Mohra Sharif and is associated with the shrine.

== Literary work ==
Gohar Nazir is also associated with Urdu religious and Sufi poetry. There are three works attributed to him: Arzo-e-Natamam (Urdu: آرزوئے نا تمام), Khial Rung (Urdu: خیال رنگ) and Rag-e-Jan(Urdu: رگِ جاں).
