= 2009 Vítkov arson attack =

2009 Antiziganist attack involving Molotov cocktails

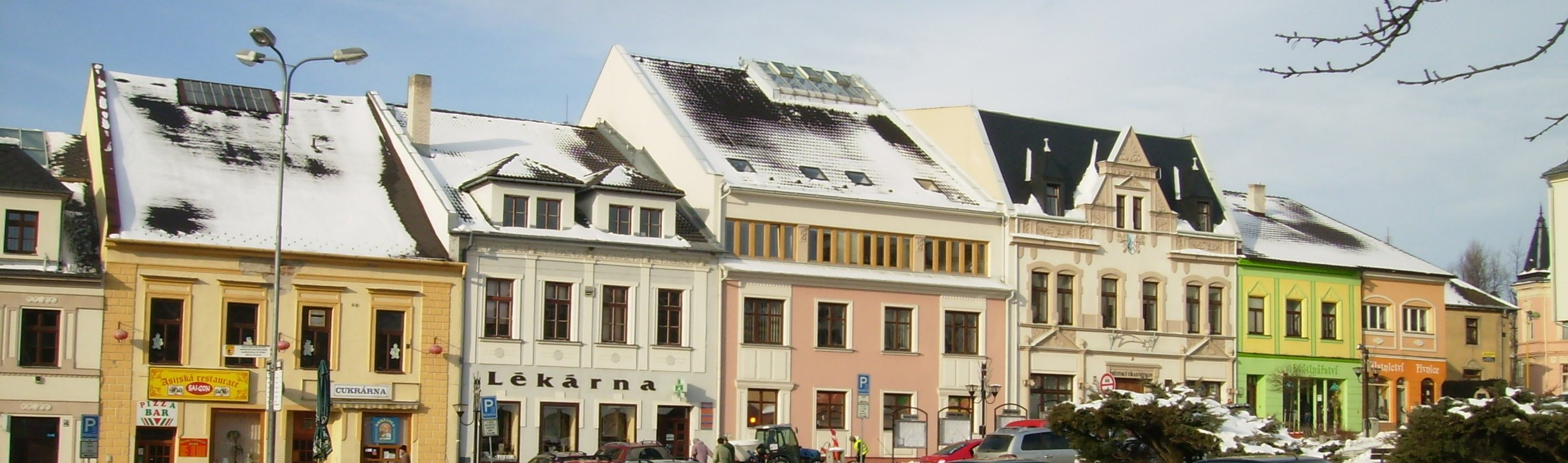
- Part of the Vítkov town square
- Location: 49°46′44″N 17°45′22″E; Vítkov, Czech Republic
- Date: night of 18 to 19 April 2009; ~ 23:45 (UTC+2)
- Attack type: Arson
- Weapon: Molotov cocktail (Euro regular 95 unleaded gasoline)
- Deaths: 0
- Injuries: 3
- Perpetrators: Jaromír Lukeš; David Vaculík; Ivo Müller; Václav Cojocaru
- Motive: Racial (antiziganism)

The Vítkov arson attack was an arson attack that occurred in Vítkov in the Czech Republic during the night of 18 to 19 April 2009. Three Molotov cocktails were thrown through the windows of a house inhabited by a Roma family. Three people were injured. The most seriously injured was a three-year-old girl named Natálie, who suffered life-threatening burns on 80% of her body.

== Attack ==
- 18 April 2009
  - 21:30 The attackers drove in a car past the house inhabited by the victims.
  - ~ 23:00 The perpetrators prepared their Molotov cocktails in an unidentified isolated location, not far from the target house. They used 0.7 and 1 litre alcoholic drink bottles, which they filled 3/4 up with gasoline and plugged with fabric.
  - ~ 23:45 The perpetrators stopped their car near the house. Three of them had by this time covered their faces and had put on gloves. (Allegedly their leader Jaromír Lukeš, who was driving, had not covered his face). David Vaculík, Ivo Müller and Václav Cojocaru, each carrying one Molotov cocktail ran up to the house and each threw a bottle through a different window, instantly setting fire to virtually the entire interior of the house.

== Victims ==
The most severely injured of the victims was Natálie Kudriková, aged 3, who suffered second- and third-degree burns over 80% of her body, and lost two of her fingers at the time of the attack. Later a third finger had to be surgically removed. She would probably never be able to grasp objects with her right hand, which was burned more severely than the left. According to expert witness Igor Dvořáček, the many long-lasting anaesthesia doses necessary for her treatment have also caused minor mental retardation. The head of Vinohrady Hospital in Prague Burn Trauma Centre, Ludomír Brož, testified that burns sixteen times less extensive than those suffered by Natálie can threaten a child's life. She spent three months in an induced coma and a further five months in the hospital, during which time she underwent numerous plastic surgery operations, 20 of them being major ones. During the treatment she almost died three times, surviving only thanks to medical apparatus. She is the first child with such extensive burn wounds to have survived in the Czech Republic. In 2009 alone, the insurance company (Note: In the Czech Republic all citizens are insured: insurance for children and students up to 26 years old is paid by the state, worker's insurance is paid by employee, insurance for the registered unemployed is paid by the state, while unregistered unemployed must finance their own insurance) paid over 6 million CZK (about US$340,000) for Natálie's treatment. The insurance company will recover the debt from the convicted perpetrators if they have the money, but their ability to pay such an amount is currently next to null.

Natálie's mother, Anna Siváková, aged 27, suffered burns on 30% of her body. She spent 10 days at the intensive-care unit of the University Faculty Hospital in Ostrava, and was released from hospital after three weeks. The defense challenged her testimony because when she testified in court she was under medication. The attackers' lawyers also made much of her own extensive criminal history. She had been convicted eight times.

Siváková's partner, Pavel Kudrik, aged 33, suffered burns on his hands and back. He was released from hospital after 11 days. Initially treated in Opava, he was transferred to a different hospital after police found out that Kudrik was himself "on the run" and should have been behind bars at the time of the attack. His most recent conviction was for driving without a license. Kudrik's criminal history included 14 convictions. After spending three days in prison, Kudrik was released on the President's order, later receiving a full Presidential pardon.

Siváková's mother, Vlasta Malá, was also living in the house. She did not suffer any injuries. After the attack she claimed that she had heard shouts of "Burn gypsies!" The defense challenged her testimony, citing differences between what she had told the investigators and what she testified at the court. Malá reacted by saying "Why should such details matter? They burned us!" However, Malá's own record included four criminal convictions, one of them for an assault on a public official.

Václav Malý, Malá's husband, was also living in the house. Malý was not injured, but he claimed damages for a very wide variety of consumer electronics he had stored in the house. The defense challenged this and asserted that the house was being used to store stolen goods, which Malý denied. Malý had been convicted 12 times.

Vlasta and Václav Malý helped three children, who were living in the house with Siváková, to escape the fire. Neither the Malýs nor the three children were hurt in the attack.

== Investigation ==
Vítkov
- Location within Czech Republic
- Coordinates: 49°46′44″N 17°45′22″E

- 19 April 2009 The investigation began. One of the victims claimed that she had heard someone calling out "Burn gypsies!" Senior politicians, including the Czech prime minister and president, condemned the act, placing it in the context of a more general growth of extremist groups. A special team of fifteen detectives was set up to head up the police investigation. There were three initial working hypotheses: a racially motivated attack, an attack by a money lender to whom the victims were in debt, or a personally motivated revenge attack.

Before the attack, one of the perpetrators called a friend, who was at a discothèque. Asked about the call by her companion, the girl answered, "He said they are going on gypsies." A volunteer fireman, who was near the two young women in the discothèque overheard the conversation. On the next day he made the connection between the conversation and the arson attack, and contacted the police. The discothèque witness later faced death threats from right-wing extremists, as a result of which he refused to testify in court. However the lead was crucial, because investigators were able to identify and tap suspects' telephones, and so start uncovering the background to the attack. The police made no public reference to this lead. Officially they maintained that they had no direct leads, but were following up on the suspicion that the attack might be part of wider campaign of violence orchestrated by leaders of the Czech extreme right, and not an isolated incident. The fireman's contribution would be revealed only after the end of the investigation. The Internal Security Agency provided the police investigators with relevant information very quickly after the attack; as the investigation continued this unusual level of cooperation was maintained. The Agency's annual reports had routinely been flagging up right wing extremist groups as a danger to national security, which explained its long-term close interest in them.

- 30 April 2009 The Czech police chief stated his firm belief that the perpetrators would be identified within a month. He also announced that for the police it was a matter of honour to find the perpetrators.
- 13 May 2009 The police stated they were optimistic about finding the perpetrators of the attack. They were looking for a dark coloured car which had been seen at the scene of the attack. Meanwhile, it was made public that the attack had involved the throwing of three Molotov cocktails.
- 27 May 2009 As many as 500 people had by now been questioned about the arson attack. The police found the dark coloured car, but they reported that this had been a blind lead. Meanwhile, the police let it be known that they were examining the theory that the attack had been an act of revenge, after an incident two months before the attack in which a car had hit a pedestrian in front of the house. The pedestrian had died. However, this later turned out to be an unrelated incident.

While interviewing one of the suspects (without revealing any exceptional interest in him), police installed a listening device in his car. Later, as the evident lack of police progress caused the suspects to relax, the tapping of this car would prove vital in solving the case.

- 15 July 2009 Although the police had now questioned about 600 people, they reported that there had been no leads. The police also stated that they were following up on the possibility that the arson attack had been a random criminal offence.
- 28 July 2009 A police spokesman announced that the crime might remain unsolved. A newspaper report later stated that the attackers might never be identified or brought to justice.
- 12 August 2009 The police arrested twelve alleged extremists from Silesia and North Moravia in connection with the attack. Some of those arrested were charged the same day.
- 14 August 2009 The police charged four of the twelve arrested with attempted homicide. The other eight were released.
- 25 January 2010 The police investigation was formally closed, and the files handed over to the public prosecutor's office.
- 25 February 2010 The accused were indicted on charges of attempted multiple homicide and of damage to property. If convicted, they could receive lengthy prison terms.
- 5 October 2010 In her closing submission the prosecutor requested that three of the accused should each receive an "exceptional penalty", reflecting the aggravated nature of the offences alleged. (Note: According to the Czech Penal Code valid at the time the exceptional penalty was fifteen to twenty-five years' imprisonment. It may be carried out for crimes for which it is explicitly indicated by the code, one of them being aggravated murder (and attempted aggravated murder) and (cumulative) if the danger of the act for society is very high or if the possibility of rehabilitation of the offender is very low.) For the fourth accused she requested a term of imprisonment based on the general range of terms for a murder conviction. The prosecutor claimed that the accused knew very well, from their detailed planning, that the house was inhabited by numerous people, and that they knew about the ethnicity of the residents, which was the principal motive for the attack, and that they intended either to burn their victims to death or else to inflict life-threatening injuries on all of them. The prosecutor asserted that the criminal acts were committed in order to honour the upcoming birthday of Austrian-born Adolf Hitler. Specifically, the prosecutor requested that if convicted:
  - David Vaculík may receive a jail term in the higher half of the "exceptional penalty" band (20–25 years), because he was believed to have masterminded the attack and has shown no remorse for the act.
  - Jaromír Lukeš may receive a jail term of slightly less than half of the maximum "exceptional penalty" (19–20 years), because he was believed to have selected the house to be attacked.
  - Václav Cojocaru may receive a jail term in the lower half of the exceptional penalty band (15–20 years).
  - Ivo Müller may receive a jail term slightly below the maximum of the standard penalty (14–15 years): as he had cooperated with the investigation and had apologized to the victims. He was the only member of the gang who had shown remorse.
- 20 October 2010 The court in Ostrava found all the defendants guilty of racially motivated attempted multiple homicide and of destroying property. The court sentenced David Vaculík, Jaromír Lukeš and Ivo Müller to 22 years of imprisonment in a maximum security prison and Václav Cojocaru to 20 years in a maximum security prison. They were also made liable, jointly and severally to pay damages in excess of 17 million CZK (about 700,000 €). Of this, 7.5 million CZK was a refund to the insurance company for medical treatment costs, 9.5 million CZK was compensation for the most seriously injured victim, Natálie, and 75,000 CZK was compensation for Natálie's parents. The defendants have all appealed against their convictions and sentences as well as against the damages.
- 18 March 2011 Appeal court in Olomouc reduced sentence for Ivo Müller to 20 years in maximum security prison. The decisions regarding the other perpetrators as well as the damages were upheld.
- 28 December 2011 Supreme Court refused the appellate reviews by the four arsonists.

== Perpetrators ==
=== David Vaculík ===
David Vaculík was the only member of the gang who remained silent both through the whole investigation and during the court trial, where he also waived his right to a final speech. According to the prosecution his silence followed the protocol of Combat 18. The media nicknamed him as The Lonely Wolf. Vaculík was the only member of the group who refused psychiatric evaluation designed to identify evidence of pyromania.

Vaculík suffered a minor burn wound on his hand when throwing the Molotov cocktail. Despite being in pain, he avoided visiting a pharmacy, instead asking a friend to buy him a cooling salve.

Vaculík was a supporter of the far-right. He had sent money to the right wing Czech Workers' Party in 2007 and 2008. He was a frequent participant in events and demonstrations organised by far-right groups.

According to the prosecution, the gang used Vaculík's car during the attack.

Vaculík's attorney Petr Kausta claimed that the evidence in the case was obtained illegally, and highlighted some alleged defects in the prosecution case. According to Kausta, the testimonies of other members of the group were mutually contradictory, as were the testimonies of the attacked family members, whose unreliability as witnesses was exacerbated by their own extensive criminal histories. After alleging that prosecution evidence had been unlawfully obtained, Kausta claimed that there remained no reliable untainted evidence that could convict his client. Kausta requested a full acquittal.

=== Jaromír Lukeš ===
Jaromír Lukeš was long-term supporter of ultra-right wing politics in the Czech Republic, with ties to the neo-Nazi organisations "National Resistance" and "Autonomous Nationalists". He participated actively in the activities of the far-right Workers' Party which, having been effectively dissolved in February 2010, remains the only political party to have been banned in the Czechoslovak/Czech Republic since the fall of communism in 1989. Lukeš also sponsored some of the party's demonstrations.

Lukeš was described in his indictment as a "reckless selfish fellow". When living with Nikola Šanová, the mother to one of his children, he "used to spend most of his time in pubs with friends". In the summer of 2008 he left his job and continued to live on welfare, while his partner was receiving maternity benefits. Later, after Lukeš lost the right to receive welfare, he lived off his partner, who in turn was wholly dependent on welfare and maternity benefits. Martikanová, the mother of his other child, described him as a jobless homeless person, who had never taken care of his daughter. It was a third girlfriend, Zuzana Osadníková, who called him on the night of the attack, and whose reply "they are going on gypsies" was overheard by a volunteer fireman. This had led the investigators to target Lukeš' group.

According to the prosecution it was Lukeš who had selected the target of attack. He lived in the municipality of Radkov, only eight kilometers (5.0 miles) from Vítkov, and was also a trainee cook/waiter, enrolled in a course at a Vítkov college. According to one of his extremist friends, Lukeš was a simple man, "the executor who would do anything he is told to do in order to gain admiration". Lukeš confessed to being present during the attack. However, he denied attempting to kill anyone and he also denied being an extremist. According to suspect Müller, Lukeš was the one who brought the whole idea of the attack to the members of the group.

The public outcry which followed the attack had been accompanied by public condemnation from the President and Prime Minister, both of whom called for the perpetrators to be sought and convicted: this was totally unexpected by Lukeš. Lukeš became very frightened and nervous.

Lukeš, who suffers from a slight speech disorder, remained silent for most of the trial. In his final speech, he said that he felt himself to be a victim of a political trial. He has never shown regret for the arson attack, nor apologized to the victims.

Lukeš' attorney Pavel Pěnkava asserted that his client was neither a neo-Nazi nor a co-author of the attack. He asked, without success, that Lukeš' actions to be tried not as a racially motivated attempted multiple murder, but as an offence under the bodily harm provision of the Criminal Code. This, following a conviction, would have reduced the available punishments to a prison term of 3–10 years of imprisonment. That would have been a much milder range of sentences than that available for the crimes alleged by the prosecution, and under which the court did convict Lukeš.

=== Ivo Müller ===
Ivo Müller was another frequent participant in events and demonstrations by Czech far-right groups, despite having a name that is not Czech but German. Some years before the attack he had sponsored a demonstration of National Resistance in Bruntál. He had known Vaculík and Cojocaru since grammar school.

Müller's former teacher testified that neither Müller nor Vaculík had any issues with Roma schoolmates, but on the contrary: they were friendly towards them.

Müller cooperated with the investigation and pleaded guilty to throwing the Molotov cocktail. However, he claimed that he was told by Lukeš that the targeted house was not inhabited, and that it was merely a storehouse of stolen goods. In his final speech, Müller said: "I did not expect (the attack) to have such a catastrophic outcome. I want to apologize to the families of Sivák and Malýs. I regret that such a little child was injured."

Müller's attorney Markéta Políšenská claimed that racially motivated attempted multiple murder charges were unfounded. She submitted that her client's act should be judged either as "endangering the public" or as "causing bodily harm".

=== Václav Cojocaru ===
Václav Cojocaru, age 21, was the youngest of the group members. He also had a record of taking part in events organized by Czech far-right groups despite having a non-Czech surname. (Cojocaru is a common Romanian surname.) He claimed that he has joined the neo-Nazi scene "because he liked the clothes they wear". He was also a collector of WWII memorabilia.

When younger, Cojocaru had been a member of the Scouts. A Scout leader described him as a "nice boy", who never had any issues with other children, including the Roma ones. When Cojocaru became a Scout leader, he had Romani children in his group and was perfectly friendly towards them.

Cojocaru confessed to throwing one of the bottles, and to having provided fuel, a lighter and one of the glass bottles. However, he claimed that he had no idea what the group was up to.

Cojocaru apologized for the act, but the prosecutor described his regret as insincere.

Cojocaru's attorney Ladislav Myšák claimed that there was no evidence supporting the prosecution's charge of racially motivated attempted multiple homicide. According to him the attempted homicide charges were based merely on speculation, and he therefore requested "just punishment" for Cojocaru.

== The house ==
Most of the family had been squatting in the house since 1983: Pavel Kudrik joined the rest of them in 1999. Ownership of the house had become unclear following the ethnic expulsions of 1945 and the subsequent departure of Russian troops 45 years later. Only days before the arson attack six different people, all of them living in Germany, officially inherited the house. The attacked family supposedly had no idea about the inheritance proceedings, which had lasted for seven years. The new owners had indicated no particular interest in owning the property. They wanted it to be transferred directly to the ownership of a church, but this was impossible under Czech law. First the title needed to be transferred to them: only then they would be able to donate it.

The attacked family supposedly believed that the house had been purchased by their great-grandmother 40 years earlier for a price of 2000 crowns, but no such valid transfer could be evidenced. The ruin of the house rendered it unstable, and its remains had therefore to be torn down.

== Response ==
The attack became one of the main issues discussed by the Czech media. The first reaction and the trial sentences were covered as headline news and closely observed. Many prominent figures, not only ones actively involved in the area of racism or with ethnic minorities, were expressing their opinions and comments on internet or the press outlets.

Pavel Smolka, mayor of Vítkov, stated the family were sociable, had lived in the house for 27 years, and that the attack was incomprehensible for him. He also said the town had not had any extremist attacks against Roma until this one.

Czech President Václav Klaus called the attack raw and repulsive crime and demanded exemplary punishment for the perpetrators. Czech Prime Minister, Mirek Topolánek, expressed his concern over the rising extremism and stressed the importance of fighting it. The minister of finance, Miroslav Kalousek, and the minister for human rights and minorities, Michael Kocáb, considered the attack to be a terrorist act.

The attack was sharply condemned by the Czech Roma organizations like Dženo, ROMEA, Slovo 21 and the Association of Roma in the Northern Moravia as a hideous and cowardly act. Also, these organizations organized watch patrols in order to protect other families, they criticized the sluggishness of both the Czech state organs and politicians, stating that these lead to the surge of extremist movements in the country, called the public for active opposition to Neo-Nazism and extremism in the Czech Republic and implored the Roma community not to get drawn into any provocations.

== See also ==
- 2020 Bohumín arson attack
- Relations between ethnic Czechs and Roma
- Antiziganism
- Solingen arson attack of 1993
