= Diambendi Madiega =

Burkinabé community leader

Diambendi Madiega (born 1953 or 1954) is a Burkinabé traditional healer and the chief of the town of Bollé. He used his own land to support an influx of refugees from the Mali war. His refugees support activities resulting in him being a regional co-winner of the Nansen Refugee Award in 2021.

== Career ==
Madiega is a traditional healer and the chief of the town of Bollé, near Ouagadougou. He is known in his Mossi community as the Nabaa Wogbo (Mooré language, in English: Elephant Chief.) When refugees fleeing Mali War arrived in Bollé, Madiega used his own land to provide temporary shelter to them, providing 2,500 people with housing and food. Madiega also worked as a mediator between the refugees and the local host community, and helped the displaced people navigate the United Nations High Commissioner for Refugees support system.

Along with Roukiatou Maiga, he was the regional co-winner of the United Nations High Commissioner for Refugees' Nansen Refugee Award in 2021.

== Personal life ==
Madiega was 67 years old in 2021. He is married to five wives and has 32 children.
