= Azizbek =

Azizbek is a given name. Notable people with the name include:

- Azizbek Abdugofurov (born 1992), Uzbekistani professional boxer
- Azizbek Amonov (born 1997), Uzbek footballer
- Azizbek Ashurov, Kyrgyz human-rights lawyer born in Uzbekistan
- Azizbek Haydarov (born 1985), Uzbek professional footballer
- Azizbek Turgunboev (born 1994), Uzbek professional footballer
