= Evan Atar Adaha =

South Sudanese doctor

- Born: 1960 (age 65–66); Torit, Eastern Equatoria (now South Sudan, then Sudan)
- Occupation: Surgeon
- Organization: Maban Referral Hospital
- Awards: Nansen Refugee Award (2018)

Evan Atar Adaha (born 1960 or 1966 or 1967) is a South Sudanese surgeon who won the Nansen Refugee Award in 2018. Adaha left his physician's job in Egypt to provide healthcare in Sudan during the Second Sudanese Civil War. When violence forced him out of Sudan, he relocated to South Sudan and set up the only hospital in Upper Nile State that provides surgical capacity.

== Early life and education ==
Adaha was born in Torit, Eastern Equatoria in 1966 or 1967. He attended primary school in Juba and attended university in Khartoum. He won a scholarship to study medicine in Egypt and received surgical training in Canada.

== Career ==
After graduation, Adaha worked as a doctor in Alexandria, Egypt, returning to Sudan in 1997 to work in Kurmuk, Blue Nile state during the Second Sudanese Civil War. In 2011, violence from the war forced him to relocate to Bunj, Maban County, Upper Nile State. Adaha and his patients carried medical supplies and equipment from Kurmuk to Maban by hand, during a month-long walk between the two locations, avoiding aerial bombardments from the Sudanese Air Force. He set up the Maban Referral Hospital, colloquially known as Dr. Atar's Hospital, to provide healthcare to a surrounding population of 200,000 people, including 144,000 Sudanese refugees from the Blue Nile state; it is the only hospital in the state that provides surgical services. The hospital has 120-beds, two operating theatres facility, a neonatal section, and a tuberculosis ward. As of 2018, hospital had no blood bank, the x-ray machine was broken, the generators frequently break, anaesthesia capacity is limited and the theatres are lit with a single bulb. Staff, in 2018, included two Kenyan and a Ugandan doctor supported by several administration staff and midwives primarily from Kenya and Uganda. The hospital was donated an autoclave by Médecins Sans Frontières and received financial support from British members of parliament before getting support from the South Sudanese government.

== Personal life ==
Adaha was 52 years old in 2018.

He is married and with four children, who live in Nairobi.
