= Paul Weis =

Austrian lawyer and survivor of persecution by Nazis

Paul Weis (19 March 1907 – 6 February 1991) was an Austrian lawyer and survivor of the persecution by the Nazis. He is dubbed to be the "founding father of the protection".

== Life ==
Weis was born in Vienna on 19 March 1907. He was interned at concentration camp Dachau and moved to the UK after his release. During the war, he was a member of the Committee on the Status of Stateless Persons of the Grotius Society and secretary of the Free Austrian Movement. From 1944 to 1947, he was secretary of the Legal Section of the Research Committee of the World Jewish Congress. He served as a legal advisor to the International Refugee Organization, a specialized agency created to assist refugees from 1947 until 1951, and then as the head of the legal department of the Office of the United Nations High Commissioner for Refugees (UNHCR). He also served on the Ad Hoc Committee on Statelessness and Related Problems at Lake Success in New York, which produced the Convention Relating to the Status of Refugees. He contributed groundbreaking work on international law, in particular to the right of asylum and refugee law. His monograph "Nationality and statelessness in international law" is a standard work.

He died on 6 February 1991 in Geneva.

For his work relating to the rights of refugees, Weis was awarded the Nansen Refugee Award posthumously in 1991.

== Publications ==
- The Refugee Convention, 1951: The Travaux préparatoires analysed with a Commentary by Dr. Paul Weis (PDF). UNHCR. 1990.
- Protection against group defamation : present law and its extension. London: British Section of the World Jewish Congress. 1990.
- Weis, Paul; Graupner, Rudolf. The problem of statelessness. London: British Section of the World Jewish Congress.

=== Monographs ===
- Nationality and statelessness in international law. Stevens, London 1956 (English).
  - Nationality and statelessness in international law (2. revised ed.). Alphen aan den Rijn, Netherlands and Germantown, Maryland, U.S.A.: Sijthoff & Nordhoff. 1979. ISBN 90-286-0329-8.

== Awards ==
- 1991 (posthumously): Nansen Refugee Award
