= Ihsan Ezedeen =

Syrian paediatrician

- Born: 1943 (age 82–83); As-Suwayda Governorate, Syria
- Organization: Jaramana Charity
- Known for: being "the doctor of the poor"
- Awards: Nansen Refugee Award (Middle East region finalist, 2017)

Ihsan Ezedeen (Arabic: إحسان عز الدين, romanized: Iḥsān ʻIzz al-Dīn; born 1943) is a Syrian paediatrician who provides affordable care to displaced people in Jaramana and who was the Middle East finalist for the 2017 Nansen Refugee Award. He is known in Syria as "the doctor of the poor".

== Early life and education ==
Ezedeen was born in As-Swaida governorate in 1943. He graduated from Damascus University specialising in internal paediatric medicine in 1968.

== Career ==
After graduation, Ezedeen opened a medical clinic in Jaramana with a focus on providing affordable care to low income families, providing free services to about 70% of clients, and typically charging the remainder 50 Syrian pounds (USD $0.10) in 2017, increasing to 100 in 2022. His clinic has focussed on providing care to people displaced by the Syrian civil war, and both Iraqi and Lebanese refugees in Syria. In 2017, his clinic saw between 100 and 120 patients per day. His work has attracted him the moniker of "the doctor of the poor".

In 2003, with his wife and colleagues, Ezedeen founded the Jaramana Charity, and in 2016 he launched a livelihoods program to help displaced people in Jaramana find employment. The program attracted United Nations funding.

He was the Middle East finalist for the Nansen Refugee Award in 2017.
