= Joannes Klas =

Sister Joannes Klas is an American sister of the order of Sisters of Saint Francis. She is the 1997 recipient of the United Nations High Commissioner for Refugees Nansen Refugee Award. This award is given annually by the United Nations High Commissioner for Refugees to an individual, group, or organization in recognition of outstanding service to the cause of refugees, displaced or stateless people. It was established in 1954.

== Early life and education ==
Sister Joannes was born in Wisconsin, one of six sisters and five brothers born to John and Martha Klas. She grew up in St. Rose Parish in Fredonia, WI, and was received into the community of the School Sisters of St. Francis, Milwaukee, in 1952.

== Work ==
Her first mission was as a teacher in Waterford, Wisconsin and lasted from 1954 until 1968. In 1969, she moved to St. Therese Parish in Milwaukee and taught 7th grade. In 1976, she was invited to participate in the Living Aware Program to live, learn, and participate in another culture, and was accepted to go to India. She subsequently worked with coal miners striking in Kentucky. Sister Joannes' work with Southerners for Economic Justice took her to Tupelo, Mississippi from 1980 to 1982. In 1982 she went to visit a refugee camp on the Mexico-Guatemala border and another one in Honduras as an international observer. She remained there to work with the refugee Guatemalan community. With a small budget from the United Nations for supplies, she was able to establish a school.

The refugees were eventually repatriated to Yalpemech in Northern Guatemala. They named the new village San Jose el Tesoro, after the refugee camp that had been called El Tesoro. Sister Joannes remained with them.

In 1997, on the occasion of Sister Joannes receiving the Nansen award, U.N. Secretary General Kofi Annan made the following comments in a letter commending her:

"I am pleased to join you in paying tribute to Sister Joannes Klas, the 1997 recipient of the Nansen Medal for her exceptional contributions to the cause of refugees. Sister Joannes has been a staunch advocate for the rights and well-being of Guatemalan refugees since 1982. In the true spirit of Nansen humanitarianism, she has worked with them at the grass-roots level -- first under difficult and insecure conditions in the refugee camps of Honduras, where she received essential support from Caritas; and then in the Yalpemech area of Guatemala, to which the refugees returned voluntarily in 1991. At their request, Sister Joannes joined the refugees' repatriation. She has lived and worked among them ever since, supporting and promoting their efforts to build communities and recover from the upheaval and trauma of displacement."

Sister Joannes continues to spend time in Yalpemech, and brings volunteers from her home church in Wisconsin to Guatemala.
