= Benazir Bhutto Hospital =

Hospital in Rawalpindi, Pakistan

Coordinates: 33°37′40″N 73°4′20″E

Geography
- Location: Rawalpindi, Punjab, Pakistan

Organisation
- Care system: Public
- Type: Teaching, District General
- Affiliated university: Rawalpindi Medical University

Services
- Emergency department: Yes
- Beds: 750

History
- Opened: 1957; 69 years ago

Links
- Website: bbh.org.pk
- Lists: Hospitals in Pakistan

Benazir Bhutto Hospital (Urdu: بینظیر بھٹو ہسپتال), also known as the Rawalpindi General Hospital, is a teaching hospital located on the Murree Road, Rawalpindi, Pakistan. It is a major teaching hospital offering basic specialties as well as psychiatry, orthopedics, urology and cardiology. It is associated with Rawalpindi Medical University.

Hospital was recognized by Punjab Healthcare Commission in 2022.

It is both the place where Liaqat Ali Khan died on 16 October 1951 and where Benazir Bhutto died on 27 December 2007. Both were Prime Ministers of Pakistan; both were assassinated in Liaqat National Bagh; and they were treated at the hospital by two doctors both called Khan, who were father and son.

== History ==
The hospital was opened as a district headquarters hospital in 1957.

== Departments ==
- Medicine
- Surgery
- Gynecology and Obstetrics
- Otorhinolaryngology
- Ophthalmology
- Pathology
- Psychiatry (upgraded to Institute of Psychiatry)
- Orthopedic Surgery
- Urology
- Radiology
- Cardiology
- Dermatology

The Psychiatry Department has been upgraded to the Institute of Psychiatry, the first of its kind in Punjab. The Institute of Psychiatry is also the regional center of W.H.O. for mental health.
