= Oskar Helmer =

Austrian politician (1887-1963)

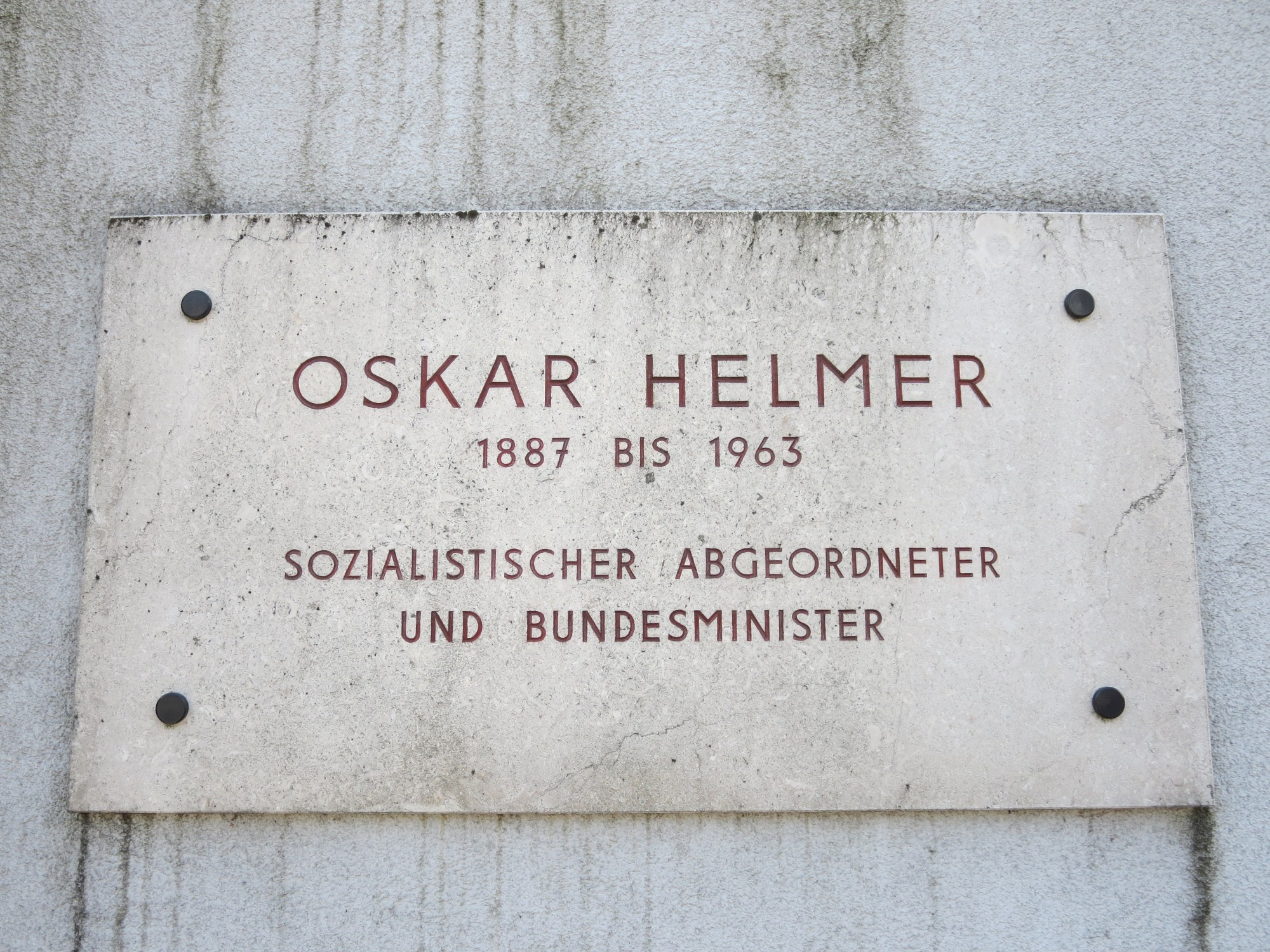
- Born: 16 November 1887; Oberwaltersdorf, Lower Austria
- Died: 1963 (aged 75–76)
- Occupations: Printer, politician
- Political party: Social Democratic Party of Austria
- Awards: Nansen Refugee Award

Oskar Helmer (1887-1963) was an Austrian printer and social-democrat party politician. He served as the Minister of the Interior from 1945.

He won the Nansen Refugee Award in 1959.

== Early life and education ==
Helmer was born on 16 November 1887 in Oberwaltersdorf in Lower Austria.

After he finished his school education, he studied printing in Wiener Neustadt, while also trying to sign apprentices up to the Austrian social-democratic youth movement. His political activities put him in contact with the Social Democratic Party of Austria which he joined in 1903 and became the Wiener Neustadt constituency secretary.

== Career ==
After his education, Helmer worked as a newspaper printer. He became the editor of Gleichheit and Wiener Volkstribüne in 1910.

He became the youngest ever social-democrat politician to be elected to the Lower Austria state parliament on 15 May 1919. After Vienna separated from Lower Austria he worked as the head of the social-democratic provincial government constituencies and the parliamentary faction. In 1927 he was promoted to the provincial capital representative.

Helmer was a member of and the deputy party chair of the Socialist Party. He was arrested by Nazis in 1934, and from 1935 to 1945 worked in the insurance industry.

In 1945, he became the Ministry of the Interior of Austria, he played a major role in the denazification process, including reforming the police force.

In 1959, he became president of Austria's Länderbank. He won the Nansen Refugee Award the same year.

== Selected publications ==
- Ö. Kampf um die Freiheit, 1949
- 50 Jahre erlebte Geschichte, 1957
- Ausgew. Reden and Schriften, 1963
- Aufbruch gegen das Unrecht, 1964

== Death and legacy ==
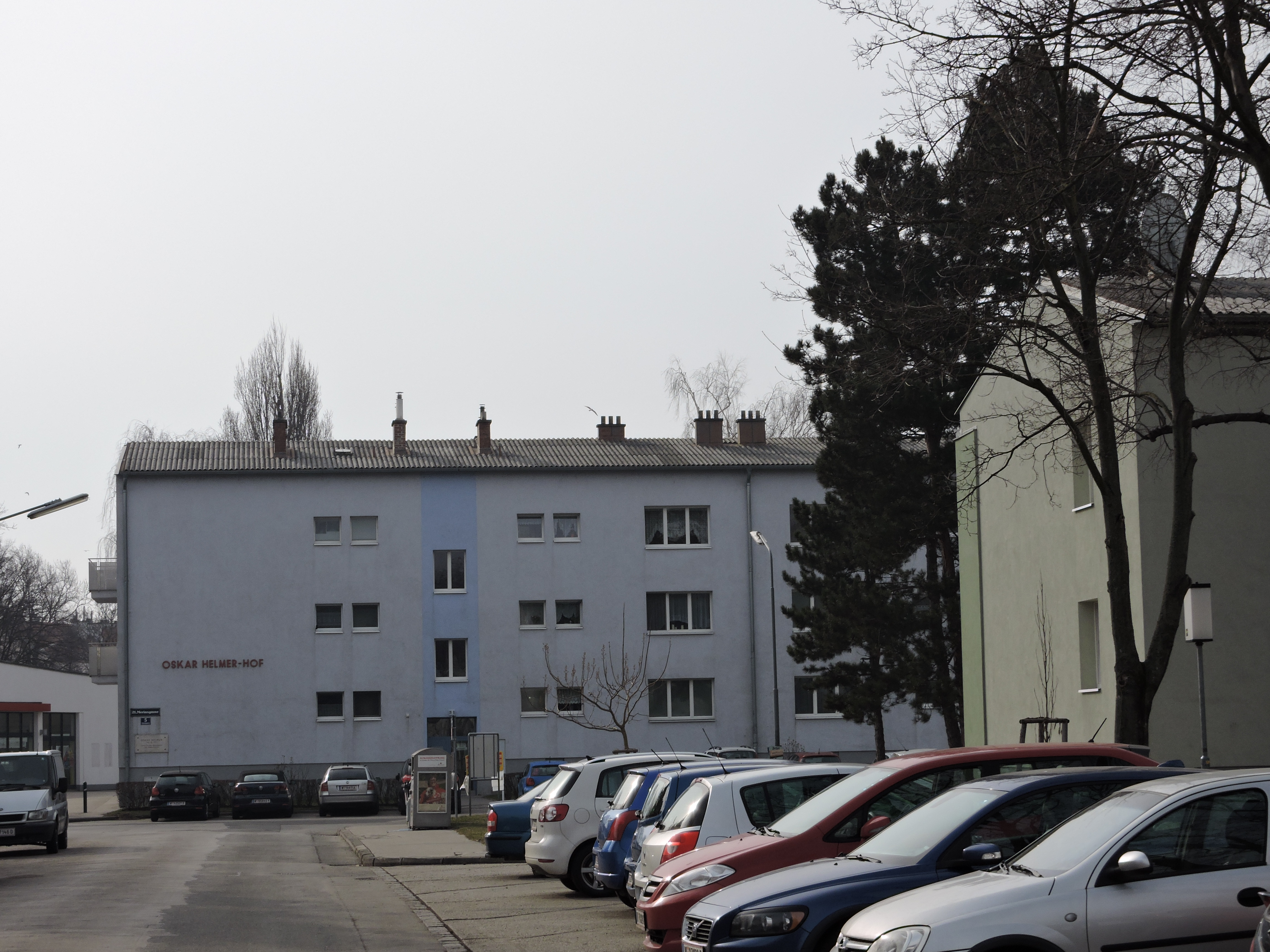
Oskar-Helmer Hof

Helmer died in 1963. The Oskar Helmer Hof, a social housing complex was named after him in 1970.

A commemorative postage stamp honouring him was released on November 13, 1987.
