= Abeer Khreisha =

Jordanian humanitarian

Abeer Khreisha (Arabic: عبير خريشة, romanized: ʻAbīr Khurayshah; born 1968 or 1969) is a Jordanian refugee support volunteer who was the Middle East regional winner of the Nansen Refugee Award in 2019.

== Early life ==
Khreisha's father died when she was a teenager.

== Adult volunteering ==
Khreisha has volunteered for 20 years at the Princess Basma Community Centre in her hometown of Madaba and nearby, where she supports the entrepreneurship of refugee women. She is known as the "mother of Syrians."

She was the Middle East winner of the Nansen Refugee Award in 2019.

== Personal life ==
Khreisha was aged 50 in 2019.
