= 1984 Nansen Refugee Award =

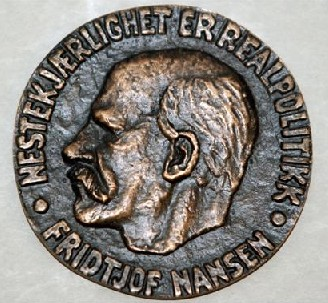
Nansen Award medal

The 1984 Nansen Refugee Award given to Lewis Hiller, Jeff Kass and Gregg Turay, three American seaman, for their 1983 rescue of 85 Vietnamese boat people in rough seas. The three men worked on the 94,000-ton tanker merchant vessel USS Rose City. The award was made by United Nations High Commissioner for Refugees.

== Laureates ==
Lewis Hiller, from Carroll, Nebraska, was the captain of the USS Rose City. Crewmen Jeff Kass and Gregg Turay were from Philadelphia and Seattle.

== The Rescue ==
During the storm on the evening of 21 September 1983, 85 boat people who had fled the Vietnam War sent out an SOS signal. The crew of the USS Rose City went to their aid and rescued all on board. As some refugees fell overboard, Kass and Turay dove into the sea to rescue them. The rescue took three and a half hours. One 16-year-old girl was lost at sea, presumed dead.

The rescued refugees were taken initially to Singapore and later resettled in the United States of America.

They were awarded the prize for their roles in the rescue of 85 Indo-Chinese boat people drifting on the South China Sea during a storm in September 1983. Hiller, the ship's captain, ordered the rescue organization. Kass and Turay dived into the sea to help some of the refugees who were in danger of drowning.

One of the people saved, along with his eight-year-old son, was Chua Quach. Quach had just been released after seven and a half years in a re-education camp, where he had been imprisoned for having been a lieutenant in the South Vietnamese Army.

=== Rescue vessel ===
The Rose City, the tanker whose crew made the rescue, was later recommissioned as the third USS Comfort, a hospital ship with beds for 1000 patients, and twelve operating rooms. It was deployed to Operation Desert Storm in 1990, and later, in 1994, to Haiti.

== Award ==
The three men were awarded the Nansen Refugee Award in 1984. In presenting the award to the three men, High Commissioner Poul Hartling, commended them for their efforts, without hesitation, to approach the small craft that was overloaded with 85 people, largely women and children, including two pregnant women and an 11 month old baby. He described how Kass and Tourey entered the turbulent waters to rescue some people who had fallen overboard.

Their daring rescue of 85 Indo-Chinese refugees in distress by stormy weather in the darkness of the night “deserves to be inscribed in golden letters in the annals of maritime and refugee history,' said High Commissioner Poul Hartling.
