= Roukiatou Maiga =

Burkinabé humanitarian

Traoré Roukiatou S. Maiga, recently more commonly known as Roukiatou Maiga, (born 1965 or 1966) is a Burkinabé organization founder and humanitarian. Along with Diambendi Madiega, she was the regional co-winner of the Nansen Refugee Award in 2021.

== Career ==
Maiga joined the Mali Red Cross in 1966 as a community outreach worker, meeting people at events and on the streets of Bamako. She became a first aid instructor in 2000, and was working as a training officer through 2016 to 2018.

Maiga set up a refugee support program in her home town of Dori when 35,000 displaced people arrived. She provides displaced people with food, shelter and support in navigating the United Nations High Commissioner for Refugees' support mechanisms. Maiga launched an agricultural cooperative.

She was the regional co-winner of the Nansen Refugee Award in 2021.

== Personal life ==
She was aged 55 in 2021.
