= Helmut Frenz =

German Lutheran pastor (1933-2011)

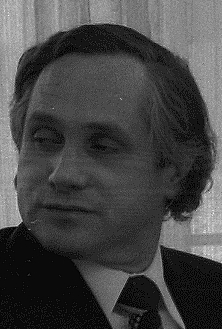
- Born: February 4, 1933; Allenstein, Germany
- Died: September 13, 2011 (aged 78); Hamburg, Germany
- Citizenship: Germany (at birth); Chile (from 2007)
- Education: University of Bonn; University of Göttingen; Kiel University
- Occupations: Pastor, Bishop, Executive Director
- Employer(s): Evangelical Lutheran Church in Chile; Amnesty International
- Organization: Committee of Cooperation for Peace in Chile
- Awards: Nansen Refugee Award (1974)

Helmut Frenz (1933–2011) was a German Lutheran pastor and human rights activist. He moved to Chile in 1965, working as a pastor and bishop, setting up two refugee-support organisations and co-founding the Committee of Cooperation for Peace in Chile before being expelled in 1975.

He was awarded the Nansen Refugee Award in 1974 and granted Chilean citizenship in 2007.

Back in Germany he was the Executive Director of Amnesty International and after retirement he directed the Schleswig-Holstein state government's refugee support activities.

== Early life and education ==
Frenz was born on February 4, 1933, in Allenstein, Germany (present day Poland) to a civil servant father and a home making mother, both members of the Nazi party. He lost his right eye in the World War II bombing, aged 10 years. In February 1945, when he was aged 11 year he was due to start his education in an elite fascist school, but the Soviet advance into Berlin interrupted that.

He studied theology at Bonn University, Göttingen University, and Kiel University.

== Career ==
Frenz was ordained as a lutheran paster in 1959. He worked in Germany for six years, until 1965 when he moved with his wife and their children to Concepción, Chile to work as the pastor in the Evangelical Lutheran Church in Chile, focussing his work on the prison population and people living in the Hualpencillo part of the city. In 1970 he was promoted to bishop and relocated to Santiago. In Santiago, he founded a diaconia organisation, and in September 1973 he also founded the Comisión Nacional de Ayuda a los Refugiados (English: National Commission for Refugee Assistance) that supported the legal, spiritual, and social needs of 7,000 refugees. Most refugees arrived from Brazil and Uruguay.

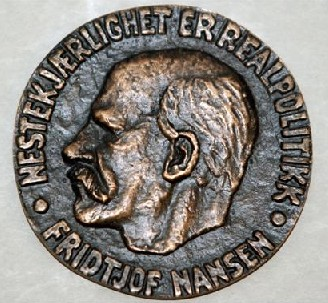
Nansen Refugee Award

In 1973, Raúl Silva Henríquez and Frenz both co-founded the Committee of Cooperation for Peace in Chile, later known as La Fundación de Ayuda Social de las Iglesias Cristianas (FASIC), (English: Social Assistance Foundation of the Christian Churches). In 1974, the United Nations High Commissioner for Refugees awarded him the Nansen Refugee Award. On October 3, 1975, he was expelled from Chile and returned to Germany; the Committee of Cooperation for Peace in Chile was shut down.

In Germany, he worked as the Executive Director of Amnesty International Germany, where he critiqued human rights violations in Chile and the activities of the Sociedad Benefactora y Educacional Dignidad (English: the Dignity Benefactor and Educational Society). A year after his retirement, he volunteered for four years at the Schleswig Holstein state government as the director of the refugee services.

== Selected publications ==
- Mi vida chilena (English My Chilean Life), 2006, 284 pages

== Personal life and death ==
In Germany in his later years, Frenz lived in Hamburg. He was married twice and had nine children.

He was awarded citizenship of Chile in 2007.

He died in 2011.

== See also ==
- 1973 Chilean coup d'état
