= Jørgen Nørredam =

Danish aid worker (died 1965)

Jørgen Nørredam (1920/1921-1965) was a Danish aid worker who died in a plane crash in Tanzania. He worked as a publisher before undertaking overseas humanitarian work for the Red Cross movement and Lutheran World Federation. In Denmark he worked for the Royal Danish Automobile Club, his aid work took him to Austria, Morocco, Congo and Tanzania. He was working in the Mwesi area of Tanzania when his plane crashed, killing him in 1965. The United Nations posthumously awarded the Nansen Refugee Award in 1965.

== Early life and education ==
Nørredam was born in Copenhagen in 1920 or 1921. He studied law at Copenhagen University, graduating in 1949.

== Career ==
After graduation, Nørredam published booked and magazines. From 1956 to 1957, he worked in Austria, working for the Danish Red Cross, helping Hungarian refugees. In 1960, he led the Red Cross' food relief for Algerian refugees in Morocco. From 1960 to 1963, Nørredam was the chief delegate for the League of Red Cross Societies' operations in the Republic of the Congo (present day Democratic Republic of the Congo). Immediately prior to his work in Tanzania, he was the secretary general of the Royal Danish Automobile Club. In 1965, he was employed by the Lutheran World Federation, deployed to Tanzania Christian Refugee Service's program in the Mwesi Highlands of Tanzania where he directed a refugee support and resettlement program.

== Death ==
On 26 February 1965, Nørredam, and three-and-a-half-years old daughter, were killed when the plane they were travelling in crashed; his wife was severely injured and taken to a hospital in Dar es Salaam. Jørgen Nørredam was 44 years old at the time of his death.

Nørredam was posthumously awarded the Nansen Refugee Award by the United Nations High Commissioner for Refugees for 1966.
