= Chris Clark (deminer) =

English deminer (born 1964)

Christopher John Clark MBE MC (born 17 June 1964) is a mine action expert. He has been awarded the Military Cross for conspicuous bravery under fire and the MBE for his role in the evacuation of foreign nationals from South Lebanon during the 2006 war. He has twice been awarded a UN Commendation for efficiency in improving UN co-ordination and effectiveness. In 2008 Clark and the Lebanese and international staff of the mine action programme in south Lebanon received the Nansen Refugee Award from the United Nations High Commissioner for Refugees in recognition of their commitment to the refugee cause.

== Background ==
Clark was born in Essex, England on 17 June 1964. He has 17 years' distinguished service in the British Army and was the operations manager in Kosovo (UNMIK), United Nations Programme Manager for Sudan and Programme Manager for the mine action programme in Lebanon. When he retired from mine action in 2011, Clark was employed by the United Nations Mine Action Service at their Geneva office.

== Lebanon ==
In 2003, Clark was appointed as both the United Nations Programme Manager for the mine action programme in South Lebanon and the Programme Manager for the Mine Action Coordination Center. He was directly responsible for the management and co-ordination of both the landmine clearance operation, following the Israeli withdrawal in May 2000, and the un-exploded cluster bomb clearance operation, following the 2006 Lebanon War.

In his five years in Lebanon Clark led the UNMACC-SL in clearing over 144,580 sub-munitions and helped facilitate the safe return of almost one million internally displaced persons (IDPs) and refugees.

After receiving the Nansen Award, Clark announced that he would donate the prize money to a community project near Tyre in Southern Lebanon.
