= Pierre Jacobsen =

French soldier and civil servant (1917 – 1957)

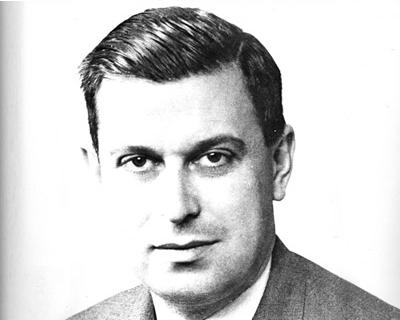
- Born: 1917; Denmark
- Died: 1 July 1957 (aged 39–40); Geneva
- Citizenship: France
- Occupations: Soldier, civil servant
- Awards: Nansen Refugee Award (posthumously, 1958)

Pierre Jacobsen (1917 to 1957) was a Denmark-born French soldier and civil servant known for his work to support refugees. Jacobsen fought for France in World War II and became the youngest French general since the Napoleonic Era. Afterwards he was the deputy director of the Intergovernmental Committee for European Migration (which later became the International Organization for Migration). He died in 1957, when a train struck his vehicle at a level crossing. He was posthumously awarded the Nansen Refugee Award in 1958.

== Early life ==
Jacobsen was born in 1917 in Denmark, later obtaining French citizenship.

== Career ==
During World War II Jacobsen fought in the Free French Forces and became a General de brigade aged 28, the youngest general in the French Army since the Napoleonic Era.

In 1945 Jacobsen was appointed as the Inspector-General of France's Ministry for Prisoners, Deportees and Refugees. In 1947 he was appointed as the Director-General of the International Refugee Organisation where be became the architect of the internationally planned migration concept and where he led the resettlement of over one million refugees.

He took part in the setting up of the Intergovernmental Committee for European Migration, and became the deputy director when it launched in February 1952.

== Death ==
Jacobsen and his colleagues Count Rossi Longhi died when a train struck their vehicle at a Geneva level crossing on July 1, 1957. After waiting for one train to pass, the gate keeper raised the barrier, signalling for them to drive forward, but the Geneva–Lausanne Express train moving in the opposite director struck their vehicle at full speed.

Jacobsen was posthumously awarded the Nansen Refugee Award in 1958.

Barthelemy Epinat of France took over Jacobsen's responsibilities at the Intergovernmental Committee for European Migration.
