= Lao Mong Hay =

Cambodian political analyst

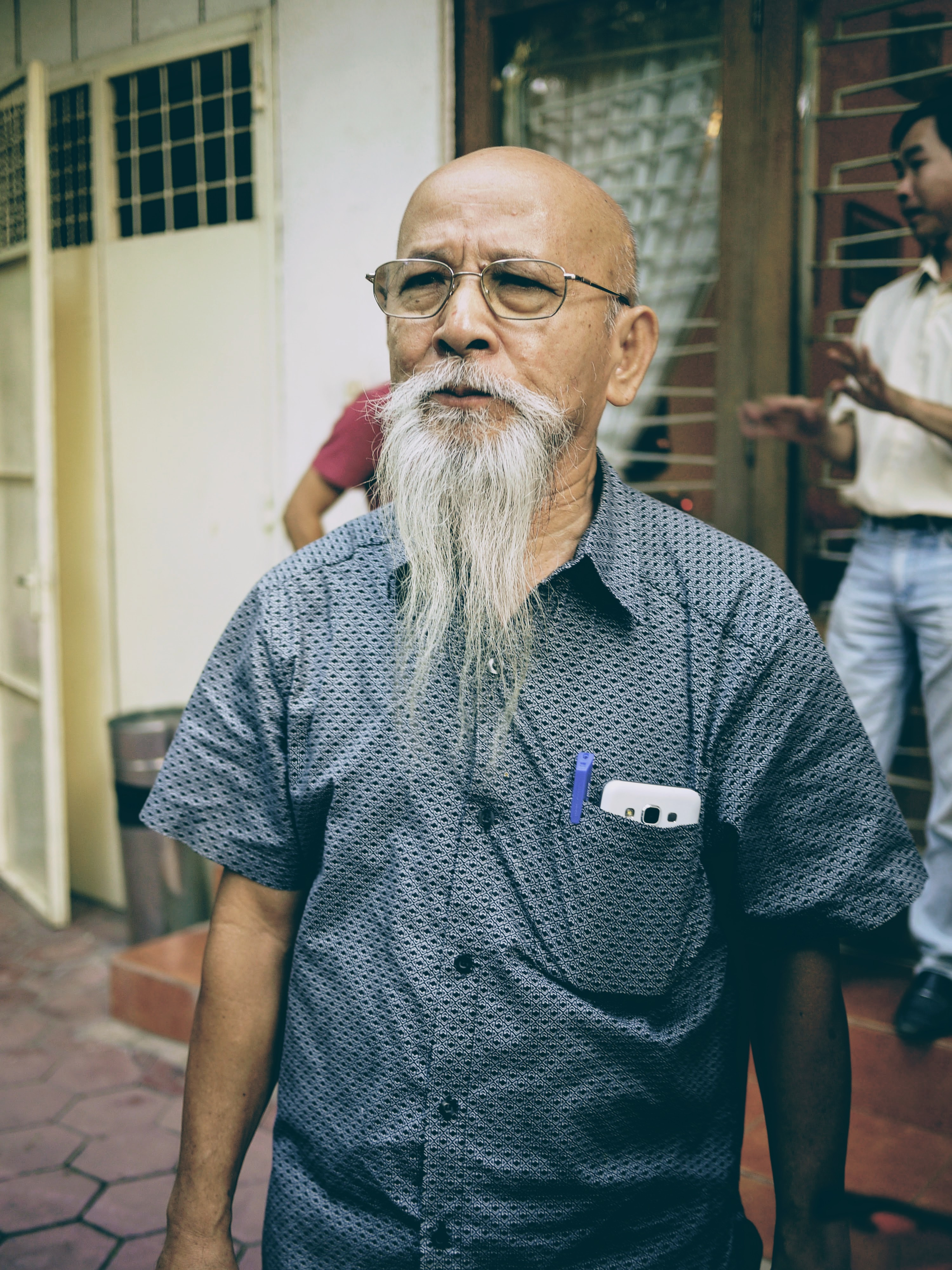
- Occupation: Political analyst
- Employer: Khmer Institute of Democracy
- Movement: Khmer People's National Liberation Front
- Awards: Nansen Refugee Award (2000)

Lao Mong Hay (Khmer: ឡៅ ម៉ុងហៃ) is a Cambodian political analyst and pro-democracy activist. He won the 2000 Nansen Refugee Award for his work with refugees following the Fall of Phnom Penh in 1975.

== Personal life ==
Mong Hay was a refugee in the United Kingdom between 1975 and 1993.

== Career ==
Mong Hay is a political analyst who is a professor of political sciences at the University of Toronto as well as the director of the Khmer Institute of Democracy in Phnom Penh.

From 1988 until 1992, Mong Hay was the director of the Institute of Public Administration and the Human Rights Unit of the Khmer People's National Liberation Front, as well as an aide to the organisation's leadership Between 1993 and 1994, Mong Hay led the Cambodian Mine Action Center.

Mong Hay won the 2000 Nansen Refugee Award
