= Rozma Ghafouri =

Afghan football coach

Rozma Ghafouri is an Afghan football player and coach. Her family fled to Iran in 1996 or 1997 when she was six years old. She is the co-founder of the Youth Initiative Fund. She was the Asia regional winner of the Nansen Refugee Award in 2020.

== Early life and education ==
Ghafouri's family fled from Afghanistan to Iran in 1996 or 1997 as the Taliban took over, when she was six years old. As a child in Iran, she worked as a labourer, her parents could not afford to put her and her four siblings through school.

== Career ==
Ghafouri is a football player and coach. In 2015, She co-founded the Youth Initiative Fund in Shiraz to support the needs of vulnerable children. The fund is supported by United Nations High Commissioner for Refugees and Iran's Bureau for Aliens and Foreign Immigrants’ Affairs and it provides support to 400 children per year; services provided include education, physical activity, and social support.

Ghafouri was the Asia regional winner of the Nansen Refugee Award in 2020.

== See also ==
- Women's football in Iran
- Afghans in Iran
