= Satellite Town, Rawalpindi =

Satellite Town
- Neighbourhood
- Interactive map of Satellite Town
- Coordinates: 33°38′0″N 73°4′0″E
- Country: Pakistan
- Province: Punjab
- City: Rawalpindi
- Time zone: UTC+5 (PST)
- Postal code: 46300

Satellite Town (Urdu, Punjabi: سیٹلایٹ ٹاؤن) is a neighbourhood locality and a Union Council Of Rawalpindi City of Rawalpindi District in Punjab, Pakistan. It is located close to the capital city Islamabad.

Several notable educational institutions are located in the town, including Barani Institute of Information Technology, PMAS, Arid Agriculture University, Rawalpindi a campus of the Rawalpindi Medical College, a campus of the Punjab College of Commerce, Rawalpindi Women University, and Fazaia Intermediate College. The IIUI Schools network, The City School and the Beacon School System have local campuses. Pakistan's top university, Quaid-i-Azam University, was initially established here before being shifted to its current location in 1971. The Board of Intermediate and Secondary Education, Rawalpindi was also headquartered here, before being moved to Morgah near Attock Refinery, Rawalpindi.
