= Hej Främling! =

Swedish charity

- Formation: November 2013
- Type: Charity
- Headquarters: Östersund
- Co-founder: Anne Lundberg
- Co-founder: Emma Arnesson
- Award(s): Nansen Refugee Award (2017, regional finalist)

Hej Främling! (English: Hello Stranger) is a Swedish charity that introduces refugees to Swedish cultural events. In 2017, the group was the European finalist for the Nansen Refugee Awards.

== Organization and activities ==
Hej Främling! was informally co-founded in Östersund in November 2013, by Anne Lundberg and Emma Arnesson. Official charitable registration occurred in September 2015. Initial activities included teaching cross-country skiing to 300 of the refugees being housed in a former army base in Grytan municipality. After initial success, the Hej främling activities expanded beyond Östersund to Farsta, Dals-Ed, Höga Kusten, and Uppsala and activities expanded to the provision of sporting equipment and clothing, and bicycle lessons.

== Reception ==
A 2020 academic study undertaken at Stockholm University indicated that the groups' activities generally improved refugees perceptions of being included in the surrounding community. In 2017, the group was the European finalist Nansen Refugee Award.
