= Vicenta González =

Nicaraguan humanitarian

Vicenta González (born 1948 or 1949) is a Nicaraguan humanitarian, the founder of Asociación Mujeres Emprendedoras de las Comunidades de Upala (English: The Association of Women Entrepreneurs of the Communities of Upala), and a retired midwife. She was the Americas winner of the Nansen Refugee Award in 2022.

== Early life ==
González was born in Nicaragua and has four siblings; her parents were farm workers.

== Adult life and career ==
González married a man from Costa Rica and in 1967, at the age of 19, moved with him to Costa Rica, where they purchased a farm near Upala. González worked as a midwife from the farm.

González is the founder of Asociación Mujeres Emprendedoras de las Comunidades de Upala a Costa Rican organisation that supports women who have fled domestic and sexual abuse. She was the Americas finalist of the Nansen Refugee Award in 2022.

== Personal life ==
González was 74 years old in 2022 and lived in San José District, Upala. She is a mother to two children, and a great grandmother.
