= Katrine Camilleri =

Maltese lawyer (born 1970)

- Born: February 24, 1970 (age 56); Island of Malta, Malta
- Education: University of Malta
- Occupation: Lawyer
- Years active: 1997–present
- Title: Director of the Jesuit Refugee Service Malta
- Awards: Nansen Refugee Award (2007)

Katrine Camilleri (born February 24, 1970) is a Maltese lawyer and Director of the Jesuit Refugee Service (JRS) Malta. She is known for her work for boat refugees and was awarded the Nansen Refugee Award in 2007.

== Early life and education ==
Camilleri studied law and as student she undertook research into access to rights and protection for refugees. After her graduation from the University of Malta in 1994, she began working in a small law firm, where she came into contact with refugees. She first worked with a Libyan asylum seeker, who was at risk of deportation.

== Career ==
In 1996, she started to volunteer with the Malta office of Jesuit Refugee Service (JRS), later working for them part-time, and eventually full-time. In 2000, Camilleri worked on her first case of a detained asylum seeker. Camilleri worked to adjust JRS programming in the early 2000s to support asylum seekers and economic migrants arriving in Malta by boat. These cases increased sharply beginning in 2002. These adjustments included hiring more professional staff (after securing additional funds), and launching projects "offering social work, health and education services" to refugees "regardless of race, religion or ethnicity". JRS also launched awareness campaigns on "refugees, the right to asylum and intercultural issues". By 2007, Camilleri had developed a study unit for law students at the University of Malta, allowing students to interact with asylum seekers with ongoing legal cases.

== Personal life ==
Camilleri was born on the island of Malta in 1970. She has two children. In April 2006, Camilleri was targeted for her work, her home and car being set on fire. Camilleri's family was inside their home when it was set on fire, and escape without injury by climbing through a window.

== Accolades ==
In 2007, she was awarded the Nansen Refugee Award (United Nations Refugee Award) in recognition of her work for the rights of boat people fleeing across the Mediterranean Sea. The following year, she received the International Women of Courage Award from the U.S. Embassy and was nominated for the European of the Year Award, given by the newspaper Politico Europe. She received the Roland Berger Human Dignity Award in April 2015. Camilleri was named to Politico's Class of 2016 for her humanitarian work.
