= Evariste Mfaume =

Congolese activist

- Born: 1972 or 1973; South Kivu, Democratic Republic of the Congo
- Organization: Solidarité des Volontaires pour l’Humanité (English: Solidarity of Volunteers for Humanity)
- Awards: Nansen Refugee Award (2019, Africa regional finalist)

Evariste Mfaume (born 1972 or 1973) is a Congolese human rights activist and humanitarian. He founded Solidarité des Volontaires pour l’Humanité (English: Solidarity of Volunteers for Humanity) in 2003, and won the Africa regional Nansen Refugee Award in 2019.

== Career ==
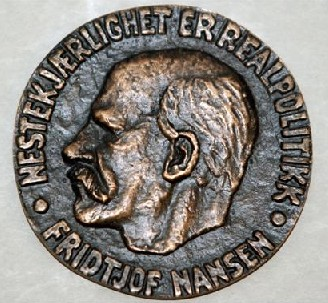
Nansen Refugee Award medal

Mfaume started reporting on human rights violations in the Democratic Republic of the Congo before expanding his reporting to other parts of East Africa, including Tanzania and Burundi. He has advocated to the Congolese government to allocate unused parcels of land to returning refugees, specifically the South Kivu villages of Baraka, Fizi, Sebele and Mboko. Mfaume founded Solidarité des Volontaires pour l’Humanité (English: Solidarity of Volunteers for Humanity) organisation in 2003.

Mfaume was awarded the African regional Nansen Refugee Award in 2019.

== Personal life ==
Mfaume lives in the South Kivu region of the Democratic Republic of the Congo and has been displaced by conflict several times.

He is married with children, and was 46 years old in 2019.
