= Maryluz Schloeter Paredes =

Venezuelan humanitarian (1932–2023)

Maryluz (Maria Luz) Schloeter Paredes (5 August 1932 – 29 December 2023) was a Venezuelan humanitarian who worked for many years with refugees in her native Venezuela, and later in several departments of the United Nations High Commissioner for Refugees (UNHCR).

== Background ==
Schloeter was born in Mérida, Venezuela, on 5 August 1932. She was the 1980 winner of the Nansen Refugee Award, which has been given yearly since 1954 by the UNHCR for excellence in work on behalf of refugees. Her work with refugee children at the Catia Community Center in Caracas led to her nomination for the Nansen Award, which she received for her role as director general of the Venezuela branch of the International Social Service, a voluntary agency which has assisted thousands of refugees from European and Latin American countries.

Schloeter died on 29 December 2023, at the age of 91.

== Education ==
Schloeter studied at the Universidad Central de Venezuela from 1952 to 1956. She continued her studies at the University of Wisconsin in the United States from 1956-1957, where she received a Master of Science degree in Sociology and Anthropology, and at the Complutense University of Madrid, Spain, from 1957-1958.

She later received a Master of Science in Public Health from the Universidad Central in 1971.

== Work ==
- Deputy Director, Division of External Relations, United Nations High Commissioner for Refugees, Centre William Rappard, Geneva, Switzerland 1990
- Head of Sub-Office, United Nations High Commissioner for Refugees, Karachi, Pakistan, 1988-1990.
- Special Advisor on Refugee Women to Deputy High Commissioner UNCRH, 1988,
- Head, Social Services Section, Division of Assistance, 1984-1987, United Nations High Commissioner for Refugees, Geneva.
- Director-General, Venezuelan Branch, International Social Service, 1974-1984.
- Professor, Fey of Economic & Social Sciences, Universidad Central de Venezuela, 1974-1984.
- Head of Urban Division, Division of Social Affairs, Ministry of Health & Social Assistance, Venezuela, 1970-1974.
- Senior Officer, Fundasocial, Caracas, Venezuela, 1970.
