= Society for Humanitarian Solidarity =

Yemeni non-governmental organization

Society for Humanitarian Solidarity (SHS)
- جمعية التكافل الإنساني
- Formation: 1995; 31 years ago
- Founder: Naseer Salim Ali Al-Hamairy
- Founded at: Yemen
- Website: shsyemen.org/en/

The Society for Humanitarian Solidarity is a non profit humanitarian NGO based in the Mayfa'a District (Shabwa Governorate) near Aden, Yemen. It was founded by Naseer Salim Ali Al-Hamairy in 1995.

The SHS provides assistance to refugees and migrants who arrive in Yemen every year. The NGO has 290 staff members. The organization also assists the local community in Ahwar, Mayfa'a district, and Hadramaut to mitigate the impact of new arrivals on the local population. The NGO won the Nansen Refugee Award, dedicated by the UNCHR.
