= Holy Family Hospital, Rawalpindi =

Hospital in Rawalpindi, Punjab, Pakistan

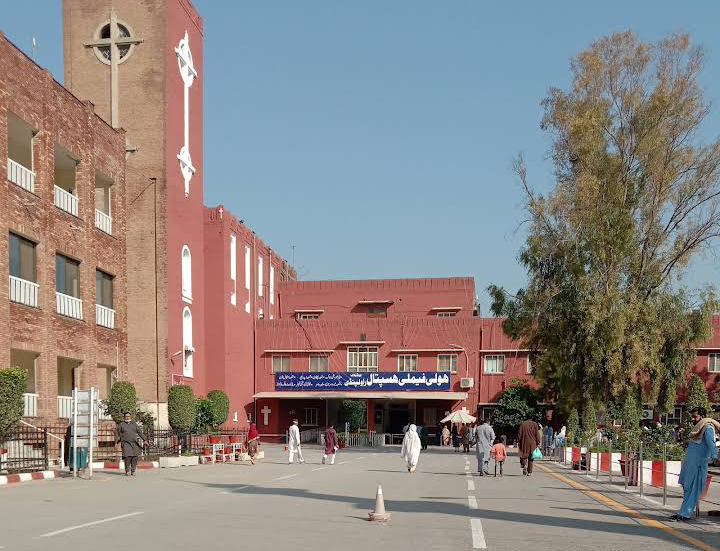

Geography
- Location: Satellite Town, Rawalpindi, Punjab, Pakistan
- Coordinates: 33.640665069883916°N 73.05719155412261°E

Organisation
- Care system: Public
- Affiliated university: Rawalpindi Medical University

Services
- Beds: 1,100

History
- Construction started: 1927; 99 years ago

Links
- Website: rmur.edu.pk/holy-family-hospital/
- Lists: Hospitals in Pakistan

Holy Family Hospital, Rawalpindi (Urdu: ہولی فیملی ہسپتال، راولپنڈی) is a government hospital in Rawalpindi, Pakistan. It is one of the largest healthcare hospitals in Rawalpindi with 1,100 beds and 12 operational departments. The hospital is affiliated with Rawalpindi Medical University.

== History ==
The hospital's history goes back to 1909, when nuns first arrived in the garrison city, opening St Catherine's Hospital behind the St. Ann's Presentation Convent High School, Rawalpindi. Anna Maria Dengel, an Austrian nun, worked here for many years and eventually founded the Medical Mission Sisters in the United States in 1925.

The Christian Mission of Philadelphia started the hospital in 1927 in an old structure near Liaquat Bagh on Murree Road, and it moved to its current location in Satellite Town in 1946.

In 1945, following World War II, an Italian architect and former prisoner of war conceived the design for Holy Family Hospital (HFH) in northern India, an initiative by Christian missionaries to serve the local people. The hospital was reestablished in 1948 after the partition of British India. Initially, it was housed in St Mary's Cambridge Higher Secondary School building.

In 1977, Government of Punjab, Pakistan was given control of the hospital as a donation from the mission, making it the largest teaching hospital in the Rawalpindi Division.

In 2024, the Government of Punjab spent Rs. 4 billion to renovate and increase the capacity of the hospital. The number of beds was increased to 1,100, and the gynecology and pediatrics department were shifted to the basement, which had been closed for years due to accumulation of waste. New furniture and modern operating theater facilities were also provided.

== Building and facilities ==
The two-storey building, financed through the generous contributions of Hindu, Christian, and Muslim benefactors, featured 200-bed wards, an emergency room, operating rooms, a labor room, nurseries, a private block, semi-private rooms, a pharmacy, a laboratory, and an outpatient department. Additional facilities included a chapel and a nursing school located on the third floor, which served as a training center and venue for various events. The building's distinguishable tower, visible from a distance, remains a significant local landmark.

The hospital also features a basement, which housed various maintenance, carpentry, electrical, tailoring, and cleaning workshops, as well as a large laundry facility. According to a Disaster Plan, the basement is capable of accommodating all hospital patients in emergency situations.
