= Tetiana Barantsova =

Ukrainian disability rights activist (1973–2025)

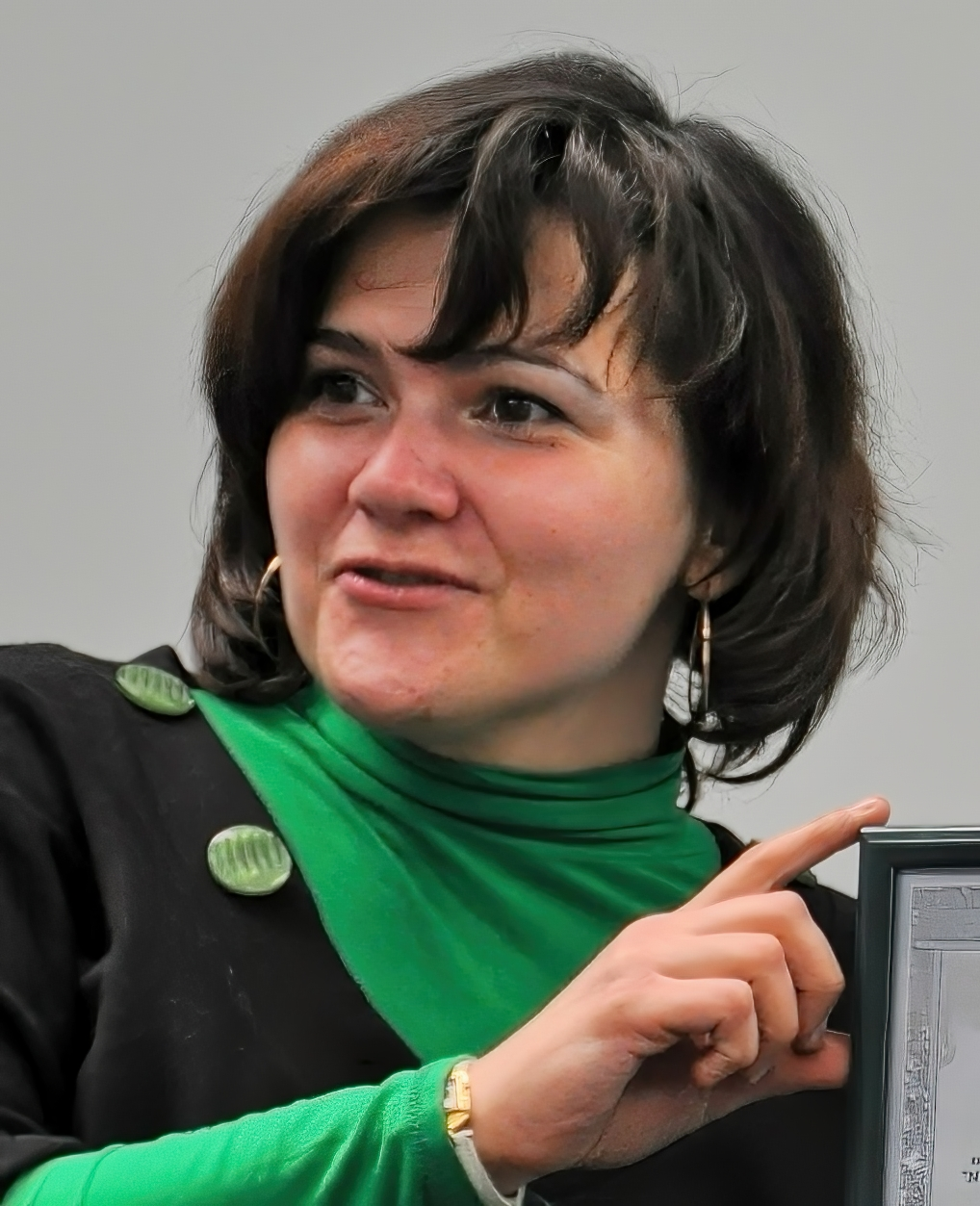
- Barantsova in 2009
- Born: 5 August 1973; Luhansk, Ukrainian SSR, USSR
- Died: 17 April 2025 (aged 51)
- Occupation: Disability rights advocate

Tetiana Barantsova (Ukrainian: Тетяна Баранцова; 5 August 1973 – 17 April 2025) was a Ukrainian disability rights activist and the founder of Ami-Skhid organisation. In 2020, she was appointed Ukrainian Government Commissioner for the Rights of Persons with Disabilities. She was the 2020 European winner of the Nansen Refugee Award.

== Early life and education ==
Barantsova was born in 1973 in Luhansk. She broke her spine at the age of ten years while doing school gymnastics. Graduated from Kyiv National University of Arts and Culture in 2002, and University of Education Management in 2018.

== Adult life ==
Barantsova was a disability rights activist and in 2002 she set up Ami-Skhid non-governmental organisation that helps Ukrainian women, families, and youth with disabilities. The organisation undertakes advocacy and provides counselling and support services to people with disabilities.

In 2014, Barantsova, her husband Oleksiy Soroka, and their son were displaced by the Russo-Ukrainian War. Once she reached safety, she set up a telephone line to provide advice to people with disabilities who were trapped in the conflict zone, and provided advice, cash, and both legal and psychological support to 5,000 people. Barantsova also set up an online school for internally displaced children, providing education to 1,000 pupils.

From 2008 to 2020 she worked in Luhansk Oblast Centre for the Sociocultural Adaptation of Youth with Physical Disabilities In 2020, she was the European winner of the Nansen Refugee Award.

As of 2022, she was an advisor to the government of Ukraine. She was appointed Government Commissioner for the Rights of Persons with Disabilities and was working to organize the evacuation abroad of people with disabilities and mobility-impaired people from various regions of Ukraine.

== Personal life and death ==
Barantsova was married to Oleksiy Soroka, and had one son. She died on 17 April 2025, at the age of 51.

== Awards ==
On 4 December 2011, she was awarded the Order of Princess Olha, 3rd Class.

In 2020, she was the European winner of the Nansen Refugee Award.
