= Reclaim Childhood =

Jordanian organisation

- Formation: 2008
- Type: Non-profit
- Headquarters: Amman, Jordan
- Co-founder: Anouk Dey
- Co-founder: Katherine Krieg
- Award: Nansen Refugee Award (2018, Middle East finalist)

Reclaim Childhood is a Jordanian organisation that supports refugee girls. It was the Nansen Refugee Award finalist for the Middle East region in 2018.

== Organization ==
The organisation was founded by Anouk Dey and Katherine Krieg in the summer of 2008, initially focussing on helping Iraqi refugee girls. The headquarters are in Amman.

Reclaim Childhood operates in Amman and Zarqa and as of 2018, provided support to around 500 refugee and Jordanian girls aged between 8 and 18 years old. Services provided include after-school activities, including sports and dance classes. The girls who are refugees come from Syria, Palestine, Iraq, Sudan, Somalia, and Yemen. Reclaim Childhood employee refugees as staff.. Partnerships with the UNHCR.

Reclaim Childhood was the Nansen Refugee Award finalist for the Middle East region in 2018.
