= Nikola Kovačević (lawyer) =

Serbian human rights lawyer

- Никола Ковачевић
- Born: June 16, 1989 (age 36)
- Occupation: Human rights lawyer
- Awards: 2021 UNHCR Nansen Refugee Award in Europe

Nikola Kovačević (Serbian: Никола Ковачевић; born 16 June 1989) is a Serbian human rights lawyer. He was the recipient of the 2021 UNHCR Nansen Refugee Award in Europe.

== Career ==
Kovačević is a human rights lawyer who supports the protection needs of refugees in Serbia. He also helps asylum seekers and refugees find shelter, employment, education and healthcare, so that they can eventually build a new life in Serbia. Kovačević's desire to represent refugees and asylum seekers was sparked by an encounter with an Iranian family in 2012 at a Serbian asylum centre. Since then, he has represented nearly 30% of all asylum seekers granted protection in Serbia.

In 2021, Kovačević was the regional winner of UNHCR Nansen Refugee Award for Europe. The award is given to "individuals, groups and organizations that go beyond their responsibilities in the field of protection of refugees, displaced persons and stateless persons." He is the first person from Serbia and the Balkans to win the award. Kovačević's work has helped to bring about significant improvements to the asylum system in Serbia, including an increase in the number of refugees granted asylum.

Kovačević is a member of the A11 Initiative for Human Rights, a Non-governmental organization based in Belgrade.
