= Sabuni Francoise Chikunda =

Congolese community leader

- Born: 1970 or 1971
- Awards: Nansen Refugee Award (Africa regional winner, 2020)

Sabuni Francoise Chikunda (born 1970 or 1971) is a Congolese torture survivor, refugee, activist, teacher, and organisation founder, based in Uganda. She was the Africa regional winner of the Nansen Refugee Award in 2020.

== Adult life ==
Chikunda was attacked in the Democratic Republic of the Congo in 1994 during the Rwandan genocide and was subjected to violence, torture, and rape from militia men who abducted her and held her for years as a slave. After escaping slavery, she fled Congo and arrived as a refugee in the Nakivale Refugee Settlement in Uganda in June 2017. By the end of 2017 she was volunteering as an English teacher in the school and a counsellor to women.

Chikunda is a community leader and is the founder of the Kabazana women’s centre, which is funded by the American Refugee Council and the United Nations High Commissioner for Refugees and which opened in 2018. The centre provides career training for women survivors of sexual violence.

Chikunda was the Africa regional winner of the Nansen Refugee Award in 2020.

Chikunda was aged 49 in 2020.
