= Mayerlín Vergara Pérez =

Colombian teacher, director of shelter home

Mayerlin Vergara
- Born: c.1975
- Occupation: Charity worker

Mayerlin Vergara or Mayerlín Vergara Pérez is a Colombian teacher, a director of a shelter home for exploited children and a recipient of the Nansen Refugee Award in 2020.

== Life ==
Vergara was born in about 1975 and she became a Colombian teacher by an unusual route. She had not been to college but she answered an advert for a night worker in the Caribbean coastal city of Barranquilla where she worked for the next seven years. It was hard work, particularly at first as she replaced a popular worker and the children were determined to not like the replacement. However she worked through the bad feeling and help them to recover.

She became the director of a shelter home for children of the Renacer Foundation. The foundation began in 1988 and it was started by Luz Stella Cárdenas.

In 2009 she was part of the campaign that led to changes to the law to bring in specific crimes (Law 1329 and 1336) for those involved in allowing their premises to be used, or aiding and abatting the sexual exploitation of children. The minimum sentence is fourteen years imprisonment. Despite these laws the trafficking between Venezeala and Colombia increased by nearly a quarter from 2015 to 2019 and sexual exploitation was considered to be the motive in over half the cases.

In 2020 she had been involved in her work for over twenty years when she was the recipient of the Nansen Refugee Award and a $150,000 prize in recognition of the hundreds of children she has rescued from sex work. She works near the city of Riohacha and her area of Colombia has received two million refugees from Venezuela. In Riohacha she reported that children are held in brothels where men pay an entry fee for sex.
