= Svana Friðriksdóttir =

Icelandic educator (born 1951)

- Born: 1 January 1951; Hólmavík, Iceland
- Occupation: Educator
- Awards: Nansen Refugee Award

Svana Friðriksdóttir is an Icelandic educator who won the Nansen Refugee Award in 1971.

== Early life and education ==
Svana was born in Hólmavík on the 1st January 1951 and moved to Kópavog at the age of thirteen years.

While she studied at teacher's college she spent her evenings and weekend either working at Hotel Saga, or volunteering as a Scout. After the Nigerian Civil War ended in 1970, awareness of the needs of refugees increased in Nordic countries and a movement called Refugees 71 started focussing on door to door fundraising, raising the equivalent of 520 million Icelandic króna. Svana was selected as a representative of the Nordic youth fundraisers and was awarded the Nansen Refugee Award in 1971 when she was 19 years old.

She received the award in Geneva from Sadruddin Aga Khan at a ceremony where U Thant spoke.

== Life in the USA ==
After finishing her teaching training, Svana married university professor Jóhanni P. Malmquist and they both moved to Pennsylvania, USA. In the USA, she studied art theory and architecture before working as a teacher, working until December 2021. She has three children, plus grandchildren.
