= Bernard Arcens =

20th century Senegalese community leader

Bernard Arcens (born 1896 or 1897) was a Senegalese merchant, community leader, and humanitarian administrator. He was the chair of the Casamance Regional Committee of the Senegal Red Cross, and the winner of the 1968 Nansen Refugee Award.

== Early life ==
Arcens was born in the Casamance Regional, in 1896 or 1897.

== Career ==
Arcens was the president of the Ziguinchor chamber of commerce and a merchant in 1914. He tried to persuade French colonialists to let Ziguinchor's residents grow rice, as per their needs and wishes, but was pressured by the French to comply with their demands that Senegalese people grew peanuts to satisfy France's domestic needs.

In 1963, Arcens was chair of the Casamance Regional Committee of the Senegal Red Cross, and also the president of the Senegal Diocesan Catholic Aid. When refugees from Portuguese Guinea started arriving in Casamance, Arcens lead the Red Cross' relief efforts. For his work supporting refugees, Prince Sadruddin Aga Khan awarded Arcens the Nansen Refugee Award on October the 10th 1968.

== Personal life ==
Arcens became blind in 1937 at the age of 40 years, although it did not stop his work.

He spoke the French and the Casamance Kriul language.

== See also ==
- French conquest of Senegal
- History of Senegal
