= Dorothy D. Houghton =

American activist

Dorothy Deemer Houghton (March 11, 1890 - March 15, 1972) was an American Republican public official and civil servant.

== Early life ==
Dorothy was born in Red Oak, Iowa and grew up in both Red Oak and Des Moines. She was the daughter of Horace E. Deemer, who was a justice of the Iowa Supreme Court. She met several political figures in childhood due to the connections of her father, with whom she had a good relationship. She studied at Wellesley College, graduating in 1912.

== Career ==
In 1921, she became the first woman on the Iowa State Conservation Board. In 1934, she served as the temporary secretary for the Iowa Republican Party. She became president of the Iowa Federation of Women’s Clubs in 1935. The following year, she was appointed to the State Board of Education and served on the Board of Curators for the State Historical Society of Iowa.

Houghton was elected president of the General Federation of Women’s Clubs (GFWC) in 1950, and served as president until 1952. She supported the United Nations while president of the GFWC. She also supported Dwight Eisenhower's presidential candidacy and campaigned across several states. Following Eisenhower's election as President, she was appointed assistant director for the Mutual Security of Refugees and Migrants, acting as a goodwill ambassador. She retired in 1956 and received the Nansen Medal that year in recognition of her work with refugees, presented by Eleanor Roosevelt. She subsequently campaigned to re-elect Eisenhower and became vice president of the Electoral College.

== Personal life ==
She married Hiram Houghton and had four children, but felt a lack of "intellectual stimulation" from being a housewife. After her political career, Houghton retired to Red Oak and continued to serve on various committees. She moved to Iowa City in 1957 after her husband's death, where she published her memoirs, Reflections. She died in 1972 aged 82 and was buried in Red Oak.
