= Humanitarian Corridors =

Partnership of Italian religious organisation

- Formation: 2015
- Type: Partnership
- Headquarters: Italy
- Website: https://www.humanitariancorridor.org/

Humanitarian Corridors is a partnership of European religious organisations, initially Italian ones, that sponsors refugees and helps them move to Europe. The partnership won the European Nansen Refugee Award in 2019.

== Membership ==
Initial members of the partnership were Sant’Egidio Community, Caritas Italiana, the Federation of Evangelical Churches in Italy, the Waldensian Table, working with the Italian Ministry of Foreign Affairs and Ministry of Interior. The partnership was later expanded to France.

== History ==
The organisation was formed in 2015 following the 2013 Lampedusa migrant shipwreck.

As of 2020, the partnership had moved 2,700 refugees and displaced people from Lebanon, Ethiopia, Jordan, and Niger to Europe, with over 2,200 of those to going Italy.

In 2019, the partnership was the European regional winner of the United Nations High Commissioner for Refugees' Nansen Refugee Award.
