= Akio Kanai =

Japanese businessperson

Akio Kanai (金井 昭雄, Kanai Akio) is the CEO of Fuji Optical in Hokkaido, Japan, and the recipient of the 2006 Nansen Refugee Award.

== Early life ==
Kanai was born in 1942 on the northern Pacific island of Sakhalin. He was forcibly displaced as a child in the turmoil of the end of World War II and moved to Japan. His early experiences forever shaped his perception of internally displaced people and refugees.

== Career ==
He studied for a business degree at Waseda University in Tokyo. In 1966, he decided to study a second subject, enrolled at the Southern California College of Optometry, and graduated in 1972 as a doctor. After visiting Hopi Indians in Arizona and helping them improve their vision by distributing spectacles, he realized he wanted to continue humanitarian work. In 1973, he returned to Japan to work in the family Fuji Optical at Hokkaido. In 1996, he became the president of the company. In 2006, he was the CEO and chairman of Fuji Optical.

== Work with refugees and internally displaced people ==
Kanai began his work with refugees in 1983 in Thailand with Indochinese refugees. Many of the refugees with impaired eyesight had lost or broken their glasses in the process of fleeing. They desperately needed to see clearly as they had to undergo courses before being resettled and required to study. He checked their eyesight so that the refugees could receive the right kind of glasses and see again.

He began cooperating with UNHCR in 1984 and conducted over 24 missions in Azerbaijan, Armenia, Thailand, and Nepal. He made cash grants of over US$75,000, trained local medical staff, provided optometry equipment, and donated more than 108,200 pairs of glasses. Fuji Optical is UNHCR's longest-serving corporate partner. Kanai further involved his company and employees in the Optical Vision Aid Mission. Over 70 of his employees have participated in the missions, using their holidays to assist in the refugee camps.

In 2006, he was awarded the prestigious Nansen Refugee Award for helping to improve the vision of refugees. He vowed to pour the prize money of $100.000 back into his humanitarian work in Armenia and Azerbaijan. During his acceptance speech for the award Kanai said: "The award is testimony to the significance that the role of optometry plays in the future of refugees by improving their sight and this empowering them to secure a ‘future in focus’... Eyesight can change one's life. My dream is that a simple pair of glasses can change the lives of refugees and internally displaced persons (IDPs) for the better." By 2016 he had improved the sight of more than 130.000 displaced people.

== Awards ==
- Nansen Refugee Award 2006
