= Jelena Silajdžić =

Bosnian producer and human rights activist

Jelena Silajdžić is a film producer, art promoter and human rights activist from Bosnia Herzegovina. She is the co-founder and executive director of Slovo 21, a non-governmental non-profit organization that focuses on the integration of Roma and immigrants in the Czech Republic. In 2000 she was awarded the Nansen Refugee Award in recognition of her work.

== Life ==
Silajdžić studied journalism at the Faculty of Political Sciences of the University of Sarajevo, graduating in 1977. She first worked as a journalist for Oslobođenje newspaper, then became a film producer. After the breakup of Yugoslavia and just before the outbreak of war in Bosnia and Herzegovina, she moved to Prague in 1992. Here she began to devote herself to activities drawing attention to human rights and the integration of Roma and immigrants, and the production of cultural events. In 1999, she founded the non-governmental non-profit organization Slovo 21, which is promotes tolerance and mutual understanding. She also established the Khamoro World Roma Festival.

== Film production ==
Before leaving for Czechoslovakia, she worked for 15 years as a film production company at Forum Sarajevo. She participated in the creation of 20 films, 6 TV series and 150 documentaries. Among her collaborators was the director Emir Kusturica; in 1988 she participated in the production of his film Time of the Gypsies (Dom za vešanje).

== Awards ==
- In 2000, she received the Nansen Refugee Award for exceptional assistance to refugees from the Balkans.
- In 2000, she received a special thanks from the International Romani Union for her work with the Roma minority.
- In 2021, she received the International Trebbia Awarded.
