= Angélique Namaika =

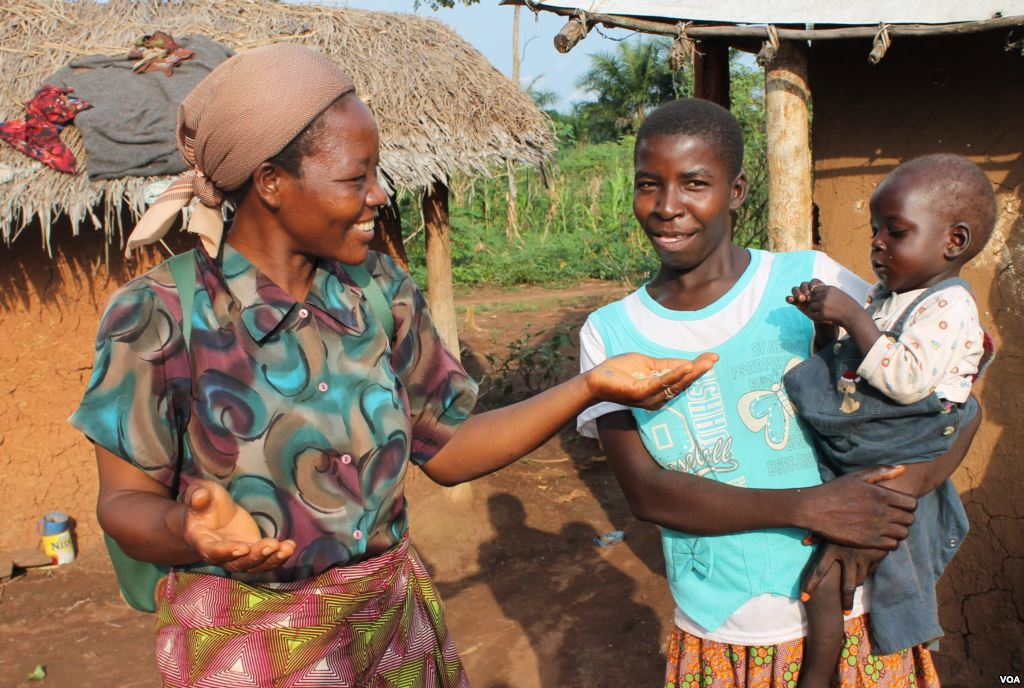
Sister Angélique Namaika with refugees in Dungu (2013).

Angélique Namaika is a Roman Catholic Augustine Sisters of Dungu and Doruma nun from the Democratic Republic of the Congo (DRC). Sister Angélique has been working in the Congo since 2008 to assist women and girls who have been abused by the Lord's Resistance Army (LRA). She is the 2013 recipient of the United Nations High Commissioner for Refugees' Nansen Refugee Award for her work with Congolese refugee women. Her Centre for Reintegration and Development is located in Dungu, Orientale Province in the northeast of the DRC. Dungu has been the center for international humanitarian efforts for women and children who have been displaced by violence and war in the area.

The sister provides functional literacy education and both business training and micro loans to the displaced women and children.
