= Zannah Mustapha (educator) =

Nigerian educator and lawyer (born c.1959)

Zannah Bukar Mustapha
- Born: 1958 or 1959 (Note: Mustapha was 63 years old in 2022)
- Occupation: Lawyer

Zannah Bukar Mustapha (born c.1959) is a Nigerian educator and lawyer. He left the legal profession in 2007 to open a school for orphaned children, opening a second school in 2016. Mustapha has twice negotiated the release of girls and women abducted in north Nigeria. He is the 2017 winner of the Nansen Refugee Award.

== Education ==
Mustapha holds bachelor's degree in law from the University of Maiduguri.

== Career ==
After graduation, Mustapha worked as a Sharia court lawyer, resigning in 2007 after 20 years to become an educator.

In the midst of the Boko Haram insurgency in 2007, Mustapha opened the Future Prowess Academy and Islamic Foundation School in Maiduguri, Borno State. The school has no fees and also provides healthcare, food, and school uniforms to orphaned children. Originally the school taught 36 students, growing to 540 in 2017. Classes include Arabic, French, English, mathematics, cookery, and textile work.

In 2016, Mustapha opened a second school, a few kilometres from the first, that supports the education of 88 students. Mustapha helped negotiate the release of 21 young women abducted in north Nigeria and the release of 82 Chibok schoolgirls in May 2017.

== Awards ==
In 2017, Mustapha was awarded the Nansen Refugee Award. In 2021, Mustapha was identified as a CNN Hero at the 15th Annual CNN Heroes All-Star Tribute.
