= Efi Latsoudi =

- Born: 1968; Athens, Greece
- Occupation(s): human rights activist, psychologist
- Awards: Nansen Refugee Award (2016)

Efi Latsoudi is a human rights activist working both to assist refugees and migrants and to bury those who die in migration attempts. In 2016, Latsoudi was awarded the UN Nansen Award.

== Life and career ==
Efi Latsoudi was born in the Piraeus district of Athens and educated in the fields of psychology and international law. She worked with youth in prison and in community mental health, moving to Lesvos in 2001. On Lesvos, she joined the international relations department of the University of the Aegean. In 2005–2006, she observed a rising number of migrants crossing the Mediterranean Sea to land in Lesvos, some of them dying at sea. Latsoudi formed a group of activists and in 2012, organized the Pikpa camp, a shelter for refugees. She also organized burials for migrants who died at sea, sometimes holding funerals on a daily basis.

In 2016, Latsoudi received the Nansen Refugee Award from the United Nations High Commissioner for Refugees.
