= Marie-Louise Bertschinger =

Swiss humanitarian (c1910-1970)

Marie-Louise Bertschinger (born 1909 or 1910) was a Swiss humanitarian who worked in Ethiopia. She was stabbed to death in November 1970 and posthumously awarded the Nansen Refugee Award in 1976.

== Career and death ==
Bertschinger was a United Nations High Commissioner for Refugees official, based in Addis Ababa, Ethiopia.

Bertschinger was stabbed while working at the United Nations High Commissioner for Refugees offices on the 19th November 1970, and died on November 23 1970 from the knife wounds she sustained. She was 60 at the time of her death.

== Legacy ==
She was posthumously awarded the Nansen Refugee Award in 1976.

== See also ==
- Attacks on humanitarian workers
