= Slovo 21 =

Czech non-governmental organization

Slovo 21 (Czech for Word 21) is a Czech non-governmental non-profit organization founded in 1999 in Prague. The executive director of the organization is Jelena Silajdžić.

== Description ==
Slovo 21 organizes educational a cultural projects for Romani community and foreigners living in the Czech Republic. The main goals of the organization are protecting the human rights, fostering tolerance, fighting against racism and xenophobia, and supporting education, employment and integration of minorities. The most significant projects of the organization are Khamoro, the World Roma, Rodina Odvedle, a project for integration of foreigners, Supporting Employment of Romani Workers in Prague, Manushe a project for low-skilled Romani women, Slovo pro cizince a o cizincích, a magazine for foreigners and more.
