= Azizbek Ashurov =

21st-century Kyrgyz lawyer

- Азизбек Ашуров
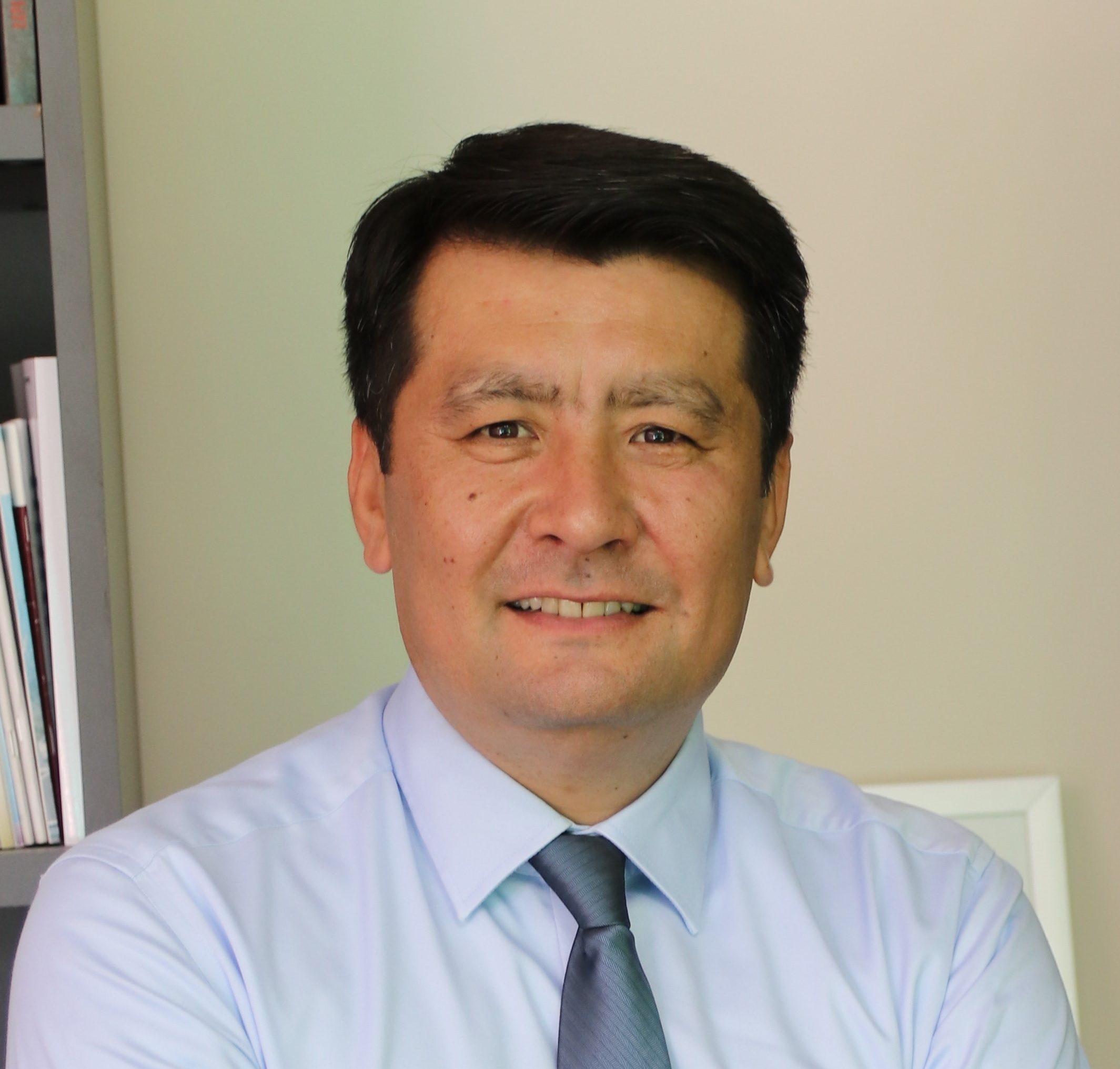
- Ashurov in 2022
- Born: Ashurov Azizbek Dzhunusovich; Uzbekistan
- Citizenship: Kyrgyzstan
- Occupation: Human rights lawyer
- Awards: Nansen Refugee Award (2019)

Azizbek Dzhusunbekovich Ashurov (Kyrgyz: Азизбек Джусунбекович Ашуров) is a Kyrgyz human rights lawyer born in Uzbekistan. He is the founder of the Ferghana Valley Lawyers Without Borders organization and is known for his work to resolve all known statelessness cases in Kyrgyzstan.

Ashurov was awarded the Nansen Refugee Award for his efforts in 2019. He is the first person to receive the award for work on statelessness.

== Personal life ==
Ashurov and his family moved from Uzbekistan to Kyrgyzstan after the dissolution of the Soviet Union in 1991. Despite his legal training, he struggled to navigate the process of getting Kyrgyz citizenship.

== Career ==
Ashurov helped found the Ferghana Valley Lawyers Without Borders organization to assist stateless people in Kyrgyzstan obtain citizenship. He collaborated with the Kyrgyzstani government on efforts to end statelessness in the country, and an amnesty on all fines levied towards stateless people. Ashurov travelled by car and by horse to support undocumented people in remote parts of Kyrgyzstan. A total of 13,000 stateless people obtained citizenship in 2019, making Kyrgyzstan the first country to end statelessness.

In 2021, Ashurov established a center on nationality issues as part of a project implemented with his Nansen Award prize. In cooperation with the Ministry of Digital Development of the Kyrgyz Republic, the center provides capacity building and education for state services, lawyers, and law students on issues of nationality, statelessness, and migration.
