= Butterflies with New Wings Building a Future =

Colombian non-profit organization

Butterflies with New Wings Building a Future (Spanish: Red Mariposas de Alas Nuevas Construyendo Futuro) is a non-profit organization from Buenaventura, Colombia. The organization is a self-help group of forcibly displaced, local women. The organization was established in 2010. It consists of nine women's rights groups. During 2014 the group was led by Mery Medina, Gloria Amparo and Maritza Asprilla.

== Background ==
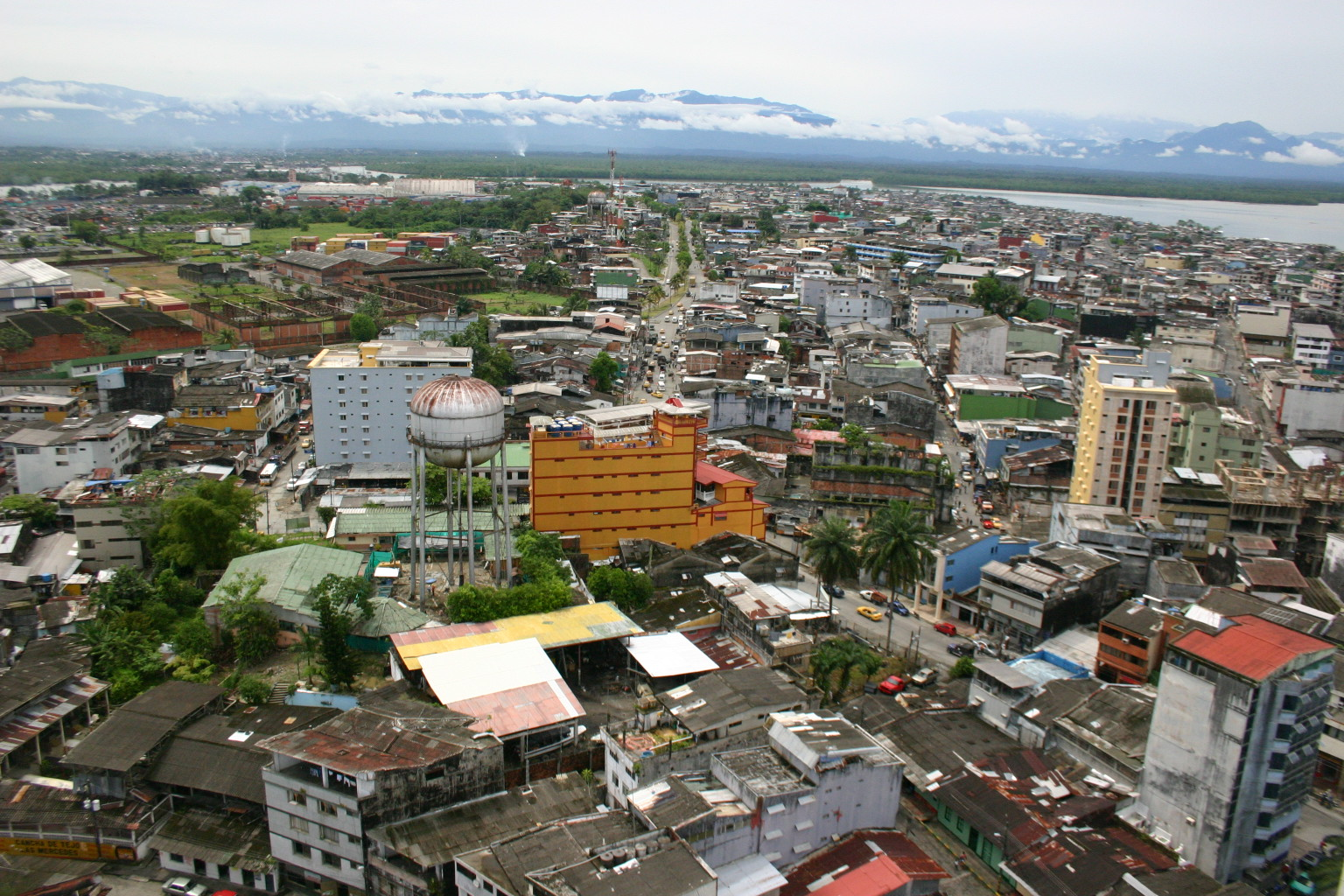
City view of Buenaventura

The women of Buenaventura experience high rates of unemployment, abductions, and sexual violence. The community largely consists of afro-Colombians. Additionally Colombia has been dealing with an armed conflict between the FARC militia and the government. Last year, 5% of the port city's population of 370,000 was forced to flee for their lives, according to Human Rights Watch. According to human rights watch there had been 2.000 investigations on disappearances and forced displacements with no convictions.

== Work ==
Butterflies provides for victims of abuse. It also reaches out to communities to educate women. One goal is also to pressure the authorities to uphold women's rights. Since its foundation the organization has helped over 1000 women and their families. Butterflies often help women and girls that became victims of sexual violence. In the long-brewing conflict in Colombia over the course of 50 years overall 200.000 people have died and 5.3 million people are registered as internally displaced persons. Those internally displaced persons are more vulnerable to abuse. Butterflies provides psychosocial care for these victims. They also work to educate women about their rights so that more crimes are reported. During their work Butterflies are often threatened by the armed militias or gangs that are controlling the areas in which they work. The organization also organizes protests against the violence against women in Colombia. With the money the organization won from the Nansen Refugee Award, which amounted to $100.000, they want to build a shelter for abused women.
