= Bollé, Burkina Faso =

Bollé
- Location in Burkina Faso
- Coordinates: 12°23′N 0°46′W
- Country: Burkina Faso
- Region: Plateau-Central Region
- Province: Ganzourgou
- Department: Méguet Department

Population (2019)
  - Total: 1,728

Bollé is a town in the Méguet Department of Ganzourgou Province in central Burkina Faso.

Population
Year	Pop.	±%
1985	939	—
2006	1,318	+40.4%
2019	1,728	+31.1%
