= Rawalpindi Medical University =

Pakistani university

- جامعہِ طبیہ راولپنڈی
- Former name: Rawalpindi Medical College
- Motto: Learn to Serve
- Type: Public
- Established: 1974
- Affiliations: Pakistan Medical Commission; Higher Education Commission (Pakistan); University of Health Sciences
- Vice-Chancellor: Major General (Rtd) Dr. Suhail Amin
- Principal: Prof. Dr.muhammad khurram
- Location: Rawalpindi, Punjab, Pakistan
- Campus: OTB: Tipu Road, NTB: Satellite Town, Rawalpindi, Pakistan
- Language: English
- Website: www.rmur.edu.pk

Rawalpindi Medical University (RMU), (Note: Urdu: جامعہِ طبیہ راولپنڈی) formerly Rawalpindi Medical College (RMC), is a public university located in Rawalpindi, Punjab, Pakistan. It is affiliated with three public sector teaching hospitals (Holy Family Hospital, Benazir Bhutto Hospital and DHQ Hospital, Rawalpindi) for undergraduate and postgraduate medical education and training. It is listed among the recognised universities and degree awarding institutions by the Higher Education Commission of Pakistan.

== History ==
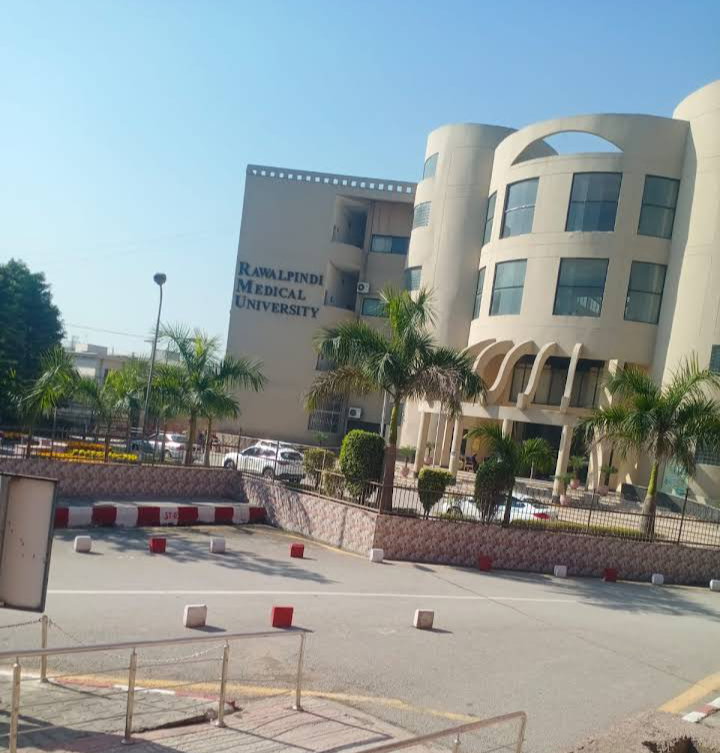
New Campus of Rawalpindi Medical University

The university was established in 1974 as Rawalpindi Medical College. It was initially affialited with the University of the Punjab, Lahore. In 2003, it became affiliated with the University of Health Sciences. In May 2017, the college was upgraded to university status by the Government of Punjab.

== Programs ==
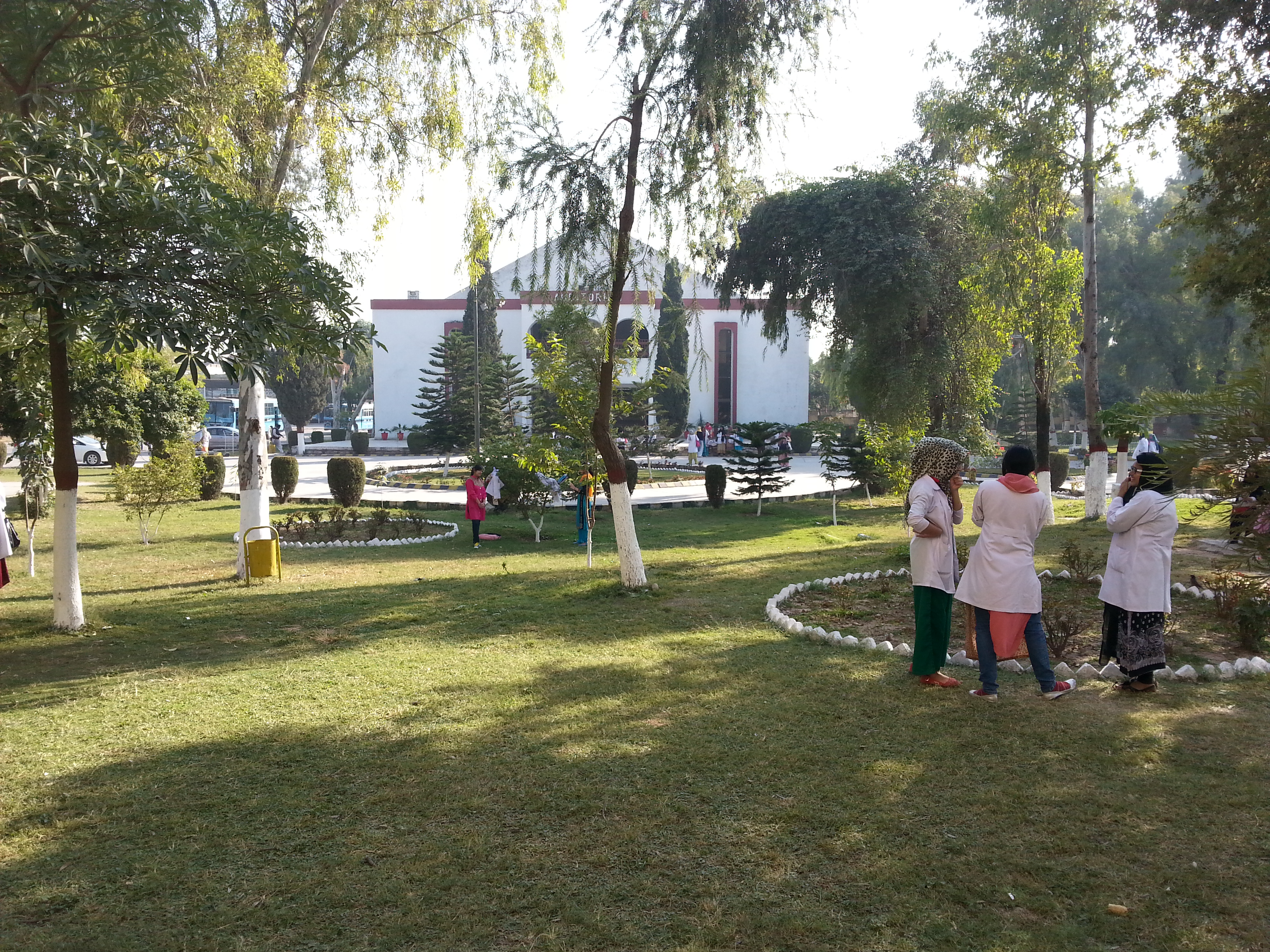
Lawn in front of the Tipu Road Campus Auditorium

University offers undergraduate programs of MBBS and BSC Allied Health as well as post graduate residency and fellowship programs at its attached teaching hospitals.

== Affiliated teaching hospitals ==
Three public sector hospitals are currently affiliated with the university, all of them are located in the city of Rawalpindi. These are Holy Family Hospital, Benazir Bhutto Hospital and District Headquarters (DHQ) Hospital, Rawalpindi. Benazir Bhutto Hospital was previously known as Rawalpindi General Hospital. It was renamed in the honor of Benazir Bhutto, as she was pronounced dead in this hospital on 27 December 2007.

== Campus ==
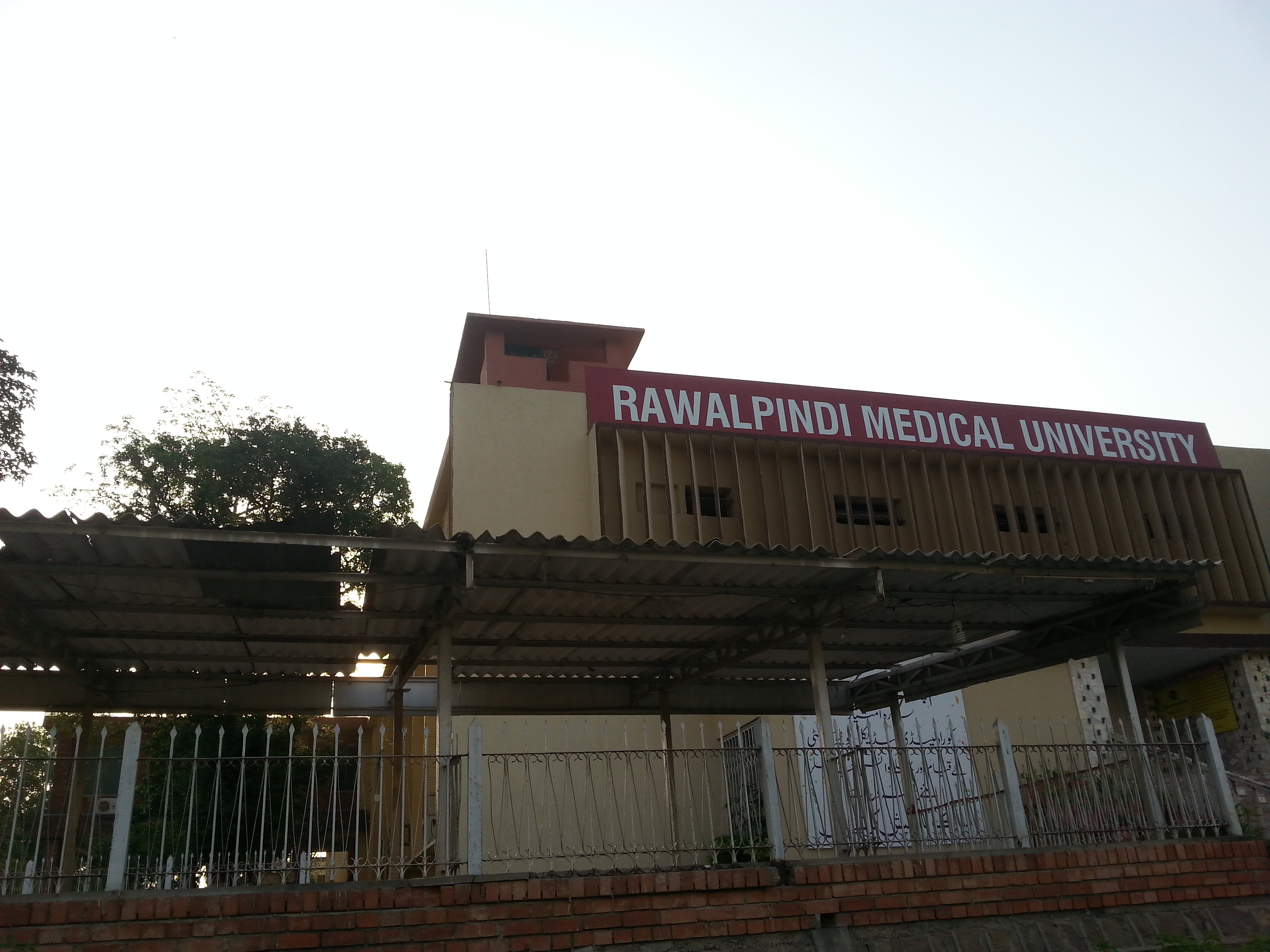
Old campus

Rawalpindi Medical University has two campuses, Tipu Road campus (also known as Old Teaching block) & Holy Family Hospital campus (also known as New Teaching block). Basic sciences classes are taught at Tipu Road campus and clinical sciences are taught at Holy Family Hospital campus.

== Societies ==
There are various societies at the university, some of the notable societies among them are MAS (Medicose Aid Society), MIG (Medicine Interest Group), SIG (Surgery Interest Group), RSRS (Rawalians Student Research Society), SYNCH, RIFAO (Rashida Iqbal Financial Aid Organisation ), Rawalians Arts Society, Rawalians Sports Society, Rawalians Literary Society, Rawalians Dramatics Club, Rawalian Adventure Club, Step Ahead Welfare Society, Rawalian Islamic Society, and Recreational Activities Club.

== Ranking ==
Rawalpindi Medical University was ranked 601–800 globally by Times Higher Education World University Rankings in 2025.
