= Nabil Gabol =

Pakistani politician (born 1962)

- نبیل گبول

Member of the National Assembly of Pakistan
- Incumbent
- Assumed office 2002

Minister of State for Ports and Shipping
- In office 9 November 2008 – 9 February 2011
- President: Asif Ali Zardari
- Prime Minister: Yusuf Raza Gillani

Deputy Speaker of Sindh Assembly
- In office 18 October 1993 – 5 November 1996
- Prime Minister: Benazir Bhutto

Personal details
- Born: November 16, 1962 (age 64) Lyari, Karachi, Pakistan
- Party: MQM-P (2026–present)
- Other political affiliations: PPP (1997–2013; 2017–2025); MQM-L (2013–2015)
- Relations: Allah Bakhsh Gabol (grandfather); Abdul Sattar Gabol (uncle)
- Education: University of Karachi

Nabil Ahmed Khan Gabol is a Pakistani politician who has been a Member of the National Assembly of Pakistan since 2024. Previously he had been a member of the National Assembly from 2002 to 2015 and a Member of the Provincial Assembly of Sindh from 1988 to 1990 and again from 1993 to 1996. He served as Minister of State for Ports and Shipping from 2008 to 2011 and as Deputy Speaker of the Sindh Assembly from 1993 to 1996.

== Early life and education ==
Born and raised in Lyari, Karachi, Sindh into the Akhwani clan of the Gabol tribe of the Baloch people in Sindh, he is the son of businessman Sardar Khan Ahmed Khan Gabol. As the tumandar (or chief) of the Gabol tribe he carries the feudal title of sardar, like his father and grandfather who also served as the tumandars of the tribe. He has also described himself as "half-Sindhi."

He did his schooling from St. Patrick's High School and graduated from Karachi University in 1982.

He was born in a political family, his grandfather, Khan Bahadur Allah Bakhsh Gabol served in the Bombay Legislative Assembly (1927) and Sindh Assembly (1936) and was the first Deputy Speaker of the Sindh Assembly in British India, defeating All-India Muslim League leader Sir Abdullah Haroon. He was a part of the Pakistan Movement and twice held the office of Mayor of Karachi in independent Pakistan. Another member of the family, his uncle Barrister Abdul Sattar Gabol, was a close associate of former president and prime minister Zulfikar Ali Bhutto and was a founding member of the Pakistan People's Party. Abdul Sattar Gabol contested from Lyari in the 1970 elections, defeating Sir Abdullah Haroon's son, Saeed Haroon.

His two brothers entered their father's business but Nabil pursued a career in politics. His elder brother, Sarfaraz Ahmed Khan Gabol, holds Omani citizenship and is involved in business in Muscat. Nabil was also a holder of Omani citizenship when he first became a member of the Sindh Assembly. This led to significant controversy when he was elected the Deputy Speaker of the Sindh Assembly, and he subsequently gave that citizenship up.

The Gabol family has long been based in Lyari and Nabil's constituency has always been Lyari.

== Political career ==
Nabil Gabol entered politics at the age of 24 as a member of the Pakistan Peoples Party (PPP). He was elected to the Provincial Assembly of Sindh as a candidate of PPP from Constituency PS-85 (Karachi South-I) in the 1988 Pakistani general election. He received 29,247 votes and defeated Khawaja Gulzar Nadeem, a candidate of Islami Jamhoori Ittehad (IJI).

He was re-elected to the Provincial Assembly of Sindh as a candidate of PPP from Constituency PS-88 (Karachi South-IV) in the 1993 Pakistani general election. He received 21,587 votes and defeated Muhammad Aslam, a candidate of Haq Parast Group (HPG). He served as Deputy Speaker of the Provincial Assembly of Sindh from October 1993 to November 1996, becoming the youngest Deputy Speaker of Sindh.

He ran for the seat of the Provincial Assembly of Sindh as a candidate of PPP from Constituency PS-88 (Karachi South-IV) in the 1997 Pakistani general election but was unsuccessful. He received 11,968 votes and lost the seat to Liaquat Ali Qureshi, a candidate of HPG.

He was elected to the National Assembly as a candidate of PPP from Constituency NA-248 (Karachi-X) in the 2002 Pakistani general election. He received 32,424 votes and defeated Naseer Uddin Swati, a candidate of Muttahida Majlis-e-Amal (MMA).

=== 2008 election ===
He was re-elected to the National Assembly as a candidate of PPP from Constituency NA-248 (Karachi-X) in the 2008 Pakistani general election. He received 84,217 votes and defeated Abdul Shakoor Shad. In November 2008, he was inducted into the federal cabinet of prime minister Yousaf Raza Gillani and was appointed as Minister of State for Ports and Shipping. As minister of state, he inaugurated the Gwadar Port in December 2008. He was included in the special team of the PPP to resolve the political crisis in Balochistan in March 2009. He met with the political and tribal leaders of Balochistan to solve the problems of the Baloch people.

During this period, then Interior Minister, Rehman Malik, appointed his son Nadir to the Consulate General of Pakistan in New York without considering seniority or merit. In 2013, the Islamabad High Court (IHC) deemed the appointments illegal and unlawful and ordered the Interior Secretary to address the irregular posting of Nadir at the Consulate General of Pakistan in New York. However, as of 2015, despite the court's orders, the government had not recalled Nadir, who was serving as the officer in charge of the machine readable passport section at the Consulate General.

He served as Minister of State for Ports and Shipping until February 2011. He resigned from the post saying that he had failed to address the problems of voters in his constituency during his tenure. Political analysts say that the resignation stemmed rather from an internal PPP tug-of-war between Gabol and Asif Ali Zardari.

In February 2016, the National Accountability Bureau (NAB) launched an investigation against Gabol over allegations of causing significant financial losses to the exchequer during his tenure as Minister of State for Ports and Shipping. He was accused of various offenses, including making illegal appointments in Karachi Port Trust and Pakistan National Shipping Corporation, unauthorized allotment of plots, improper reimbursement of medical expenses, and unauthorized retention of vehicles.

=== 2013 election ===
After he was marginalized by the PPP leadership, he announced his decision to quit the PPP in 2013 and he joined, along with his colleagues, the Muttahida Qaumi Movement (MQM). He said that PPP was no longer the party of Benazir Bhutto and therefore he left it.

His decision to join the MQM, a Muhajir nationalist party traditionally opposed to the PPP, caused a stir in the politics of Sindh, especially Karachi and Lyari as Gabol comes from a political family long associated with the PPP. Journalist Yousuf Masti Khan said that the decision was driven by power politics due to different political party gangs (including MQM's Nadeem Commando and PPP's People's Aman Committee) ruling Lyari and with weakened prospects of the PPP in the upcoming elections.

He was re-elected to the National Assembly as a candidate of MQM from Constituency NA-246 (Karachi-VIII) in Pakistani general election, 2013. He received 137,874 votes and defeated Amir Sharjeel, a candidate of Pakistan Tehreek-e-Insaf (PTI). In the same election he also ran for the seat of the National Assembly as a candidate of MQM from Constituency NA-248 (Karachi-X) but was unsuccessful. He received 6,489 votes and lost the seat to Shah Jahan Baloch. During a 2015 interview on Geo News, he alleged electoral rigging in his constituency, NA-246 (Karachi-VIII), from which he emerged victorious in the 2013 general elections. He recounted visiting polling stations on election day and observing minimal voter turnout. He claimed to have been informed that his victory was assured and that voters were not required. Furthermore, he expressed surprise upon discovering that he had received 140,000 votes despite the reported low voter turnout.

In 2015, MQM demanded Gabol's resignation from the National Assembly seat. Following which, he quit MQM and relinquished his National Assembly seat. In 2016, Gabol declared his support for Imran Khan and announced joining the protest organized by Pakistan Tehreek-e-Insaf (PTI). Afterward, he announced his intention to organize a public gathering to determine whether he should rejoin PPP or join the PTI.

In February 2017, he re-joined PPP along with his son Nadir. Opinions among residents of Lyari regarding Gabol's return to the PPP were divided, with some considering him irrelevant to Lyari's politics and holding him accountable for the presence of gangs in the area. PPP politicians in District South also expressed discontent, stating that the PPP leadership had not consulted them before readmitting Gabol into the party and emphasized his notoriety in Lyari. Additionally, there were rumors suggesting that Gabol was considering joining either the PTI or the Pakistan Muslim League-N (PML-N). However, a faction within the PTI Sindh opposed his inclusion in the party, leading to his decision to rejoin the PPP.

=== 2024 election ===
He was re-elected to the National Assembly in the 2024 Pakistani general election as a candidate of the PPP from constituency NA-239 Karachi South-I. He received 40,077 votes, defeating PTI-backed independent candidate Mohammad Yasir Baloch, who received 37,234 votes. Baloch alleged election irregularities and contested Gabol's victory. However, the Election Commission of Pakistan (ECP) dismissed the petition and instructed Baloch to contest the constituency results in an election tribunal.

== Lyari unrest ==
In August 2015, Dr. Jamil Ahmed, Deputy inspector general of police of Karachi's South district accused Gabol of attempting to instigate a law and order crisis in Lyari Town with the assistance of gangsters. In a press conference, he claimed that "Nabil Gabol had asked Ghaffar Zikri, one of the ringleaders of Lyari gang-war, to create disturbances in Lyari and that he (gangster) would be provided arms, ammunition and money for this purpose." PPP politicians from Lyari, including Provincial Minister of Sindh for Human Settlement (then Katchi Abadis) Javed Nagori, and Sindh Assembly member Saniya Naz, also accused Gabol of deploying armed individuals to the Lyari area with the intention of fomenting unrest.

His critics also accused Gabol of contributing to the rise of notorious gangs in Lyari. Gabol, however, denied the accusations. In January 2011, hundreds of protesters from Lyari staged a demonstration outside the Karachi Press Club, blaming Gabol and holding him responsible for patronizing gangsters in Lyari.

== Legal affairs ==
In August, 2018, he physically attacked an individual passenger at the Jinnah International Airport in Karachi, which sparked widespread coverage in the media. Gabol also issued threats of severe repercussions against the individual. Gabol claimed that the person in question was persistently hurling profanities at Pakistani politicians.

In March 2020, Sindh Police filed an attempted murder case against Gabol for purportedly assaulting and shooting at the residence of the chairman of the Fishermen's Cooperative Society. The complainant alleged that Gabol forcefully took a firearm from the guard at the chairman's residence and issued death threats.

In April 2023, Gabol sparked outrage with misogynistic remarks, stating, "If rape is imminent, just enjoy it." In response, the PPP issued a show cause notice to Gabol.

== In popular culture ==
A character named Jameel Jamali, which Gabol believes is inspired by him, is portrayed by actor Rakesh Bedi in the Indian spy action thriller duology Dhurandhar and Dhurandhar: The Revenge, which is based on Lyari gangwars and Operation Lyari.

Gabol does not seem to be happy about this portrayal. He has come out against the characterization and has called it false. He has gone to the extent of claiming to make a sequel to Dhurandhar, by the name of "Lyari ka Gabbar".

== See also ==
- Zafar Baloch
