= Kavasji Katrak =

Parsi businessman born in 1856

Khan Bahadur Sir Kavasji Hormusji Katrak OBE
- Born: 1856; Bombay
- Died: 24 June 1946 (aged 89–90); Karachi, British India
- Spouse: Khorshedbanu Katrak
- Children: Sohrab Katrak
- Father: Hormusji Katrak

Sir Kavasji Hormusji Katrak (1856 - 24 June 1946) was a Parsi businessman of Karachi. He was associated with several institutions in British India. The Sohrab Katrak Parsi Colony was founded by him.

== Early life ==
Kavasji Hormusji Katrak was born in 1856. His father was Sir Hormusji Katrak, a prominent Parsi that had been knighted by George V. The name 'Katrak' was an ancient family from the Indian subcontinent. Kavasji Katrak was living in Bombay prior to the start of his business career.

== Career ==
In 1874, Katrak left Bombay to begin his career. He came to Rawalpindi and found employment at Jamasji & Sons, where he worked at for a period of 18 years, before eventually coming to Karachi, where he established Katrak & Co in 1891. Katrak & Co. was an import company, which became very successful. He served on several Government organisations, including the Karachi Port Trust, Karachi Municipality, North Western State Railway's Advisory Committee, and the Daily Gazette

== Philanthropy ==
Katrak was part of several philanthropic projects, including the Virbaijee Katrak Maternity Wing (constructed in 1917 as an extension to the Lady Dufferin Hospital), the Khorshedbai Katrak Parsi Home, the YMZA (Young Mens Zoroastrian Association), the Hormusji Katrak Hall (erected in 1920), the Sohrab Katrak library, the Katrak Swimming Bath (since declared a heritage site) and the Sohrab Katrak Parsi Colony. As a result of his philanthropic contributions, he was appointed an Associate Commander of the Most Venerable Order of Saint John in 1941. The land for the Parsi General Hospital in Karachi was donated by Katrak in 1942.

== Personal life ==
Katrak married Khorshed Banu and had one son and five daughters.

His son, Sohrab Katrak served as Mayor of Karachi and authored three books, Message Eternal, Who are the Parsis and Through Amanullah's Afghanistan.

His daughters include Meherbai, who married Burjorji Madan, son of Jamshedji Framji Madan and Dinbai, a social worker who married Indian cricketer Hormasji Vajifdar.

Katrak was a Freemason, having joined the fraternity in 1877 during his time in Rawalpindi. He was knighted by George V on 1 January 1942.

== Death ==
Katrak died on 24 June 1946 in Karachi.
