= 2023 Karachi mayoral election =

2023 Karachi Mayoral Election
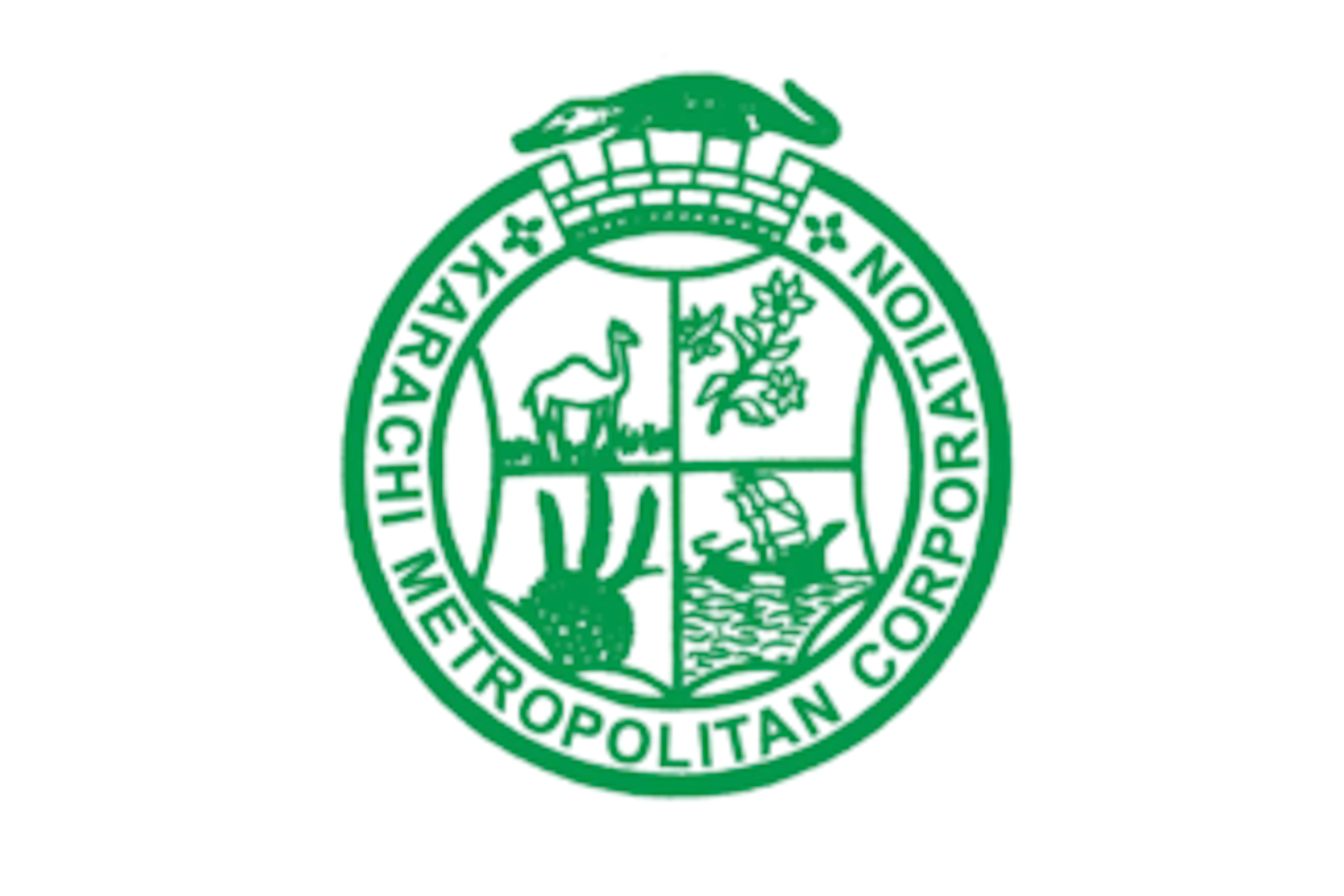
- 15 June 2023

Candidate	Murtaza Wahab	Hafiz Naeem Ur Rehman
Party	PPP	JI
Popular vote	173	160
Percentage	51.95%	48.05%
Mayor of Karachi before election
Waseem Akhtar
MQM-P
Elected Mayor of Karachi
Murtaza Wahab
PPP

The 2023 Karachi Mayoral election took place on 15 June 2023. Both Barrister Murtaza Wahab of the Pakistan Peoples Party (PPP) and Hafiz Naeem Ur Rehman of Jamaat-e-Islami (JI) ran for mayor. Salman Abdullah Murad and Saifuddin Awan were the PPP and JI's respective candidates for deputy mayor.

== Results ==
According to unofficial results, Murtaza Wahab of the PPP won the election. Naeem Ur Rehman received 160 votes, compared to his 173 votes.

== Aftermath ==
Clashes erupted outside the Arts Council of Pakistan after Murtaza Wahab won Karachi's mayoral election. The JI alleges that the poll was rigged and announced a “Black Day” across the country on 16 June 2023.
