= Karachi Water and Sewerage Corporation =

Pakistani drinking water company

The Karachi Water and Sewerage Corporation (KWSC), formerly the Karachi Water and Sewerage Board (KWSB), is a Pakistani drinking water company which produces and transports water to Karachi.

== History ==
Karachi Joint Water Board constituted in 1953 was the first body which was created to expand the Karachi water supply system from the Indus River. It was transferred to the KDA in 1957 after its formation. Since the KMC handled some of the affairs of retailing and distribution of treated water and other responsibilities which were co-shared with 22 other separate agencies, there was a need to unify all of the functions under one body. Hence, in 1981, the Karachi Water Management Board (KWMB) was created, which was given both distribution and cost recovery powers. KMC was still responsible for its revenue and sewerage maintenance, hence KWMB was upgraded to KWSB in 1983 under the Mayor, Abdul Sattar Afghani, on the advice of World Bank. It was placed under the Government of Sindh, but its board of directors was mayor of Karachi. In 1996, KWSB was separated from KMC and was brought back under mayoral supervision in 2001 until it was separated again under the new SLGO 2013 act.

== Wastewater Treatment Modernization ==
KWSC has undertaken efforts to rehabilitate and expand its aging sewage treatment infrastructure, including Treatment Plants I, II, and III, while developing new facilities such as Treatment Plant IV (TP-IV) and the West Karachi Water Recycling Project, with support from the World Bank, Asian Development Bank, and Asian Infrastructure Investment Bank. The TP-IV project, planned for Korangi to treat wastewater flows from Shah Faisal, Landhi, Korangi, and Malir Town, incorporates solar photovoltaic systems and biogas-based Combined Heat and Power (CHP) technology, using anaerobic digestion of organic waste to generate energy and reduce the plant's operational carbon footprint. Separately, KWSC has proposed a seawater desalination plant at Ibrahim Hyderi using reverse osmosis technology, intended to help diversify the city's freshwater supply beyond the Indus River system.

== Corruption and mismanagement ==
Some members of the Board (along with local police and local politicians) have been accused and suspected in multiple corruption and bribery cases, contributing to low-income areas of the city often being in a state of chronic water crisis. In May 2022, local Jamaat-e-Islami chief Hafiz Naeemur Rehman estimated that based on official records, up to 40 per cent of water volume was stolen or wasted (with the KWSB estimating between one-quarter and one-third), and experts have estimated that demand in Karachi is nearly double the existing supply. Hundreds of hydrants have operated illegally with the support of influential people, with members of the anti-theft cell of the Board established to take action against the illegal hydrants suspected of helping facilitate their operation. Some officials previously arrested for corruption have also later been re-appointed to positions within the Board. Furthermore, as of the 2000s, gangs have set up their own lines to tap into or siphon off an estimated 37,854 cubic metres of water per day from pipes to hydrants and tankers for profit, with unofficial tankers stealing around Rs$57 billion worth of water per year. In some cases, official water distributions to certain areas of the city are so low (only providing access to water once or twice a month) that the illegal sources or exorbitantly-priced water from private vendors (which can cost 30 times that which the government charges) are the only way for the local population to get reliable access. Aging parts of the system also cannot be renovated due to a lack of funds, and despite a growing population, as of 2016, no new pipeline had been installed in a quarter-century.

== See also ==
- Dumlottee Wells
- K-IV water project
- Water supply and sanitation in Pakistan
