= K-IV water project =

Pakistani water project

The K-IV water project (Urdu: کے فور پانی کے منصوبہ), abbreviated as K-IV, is a pending water supply project being jointly developed by the provincial and federal governments in Karachi, Pakistan, to augment the city's daily water supply. The estimated cost was approximately Rs. 25.5 billion, which now increased to 150 billion PKR, while the project is designed to provide 2.4 million cubic metres of water daily to Karachi in three phases. The new water supply will be extracted from Keenjhar Lake through three water canals. The project was slated for completion in mid-2019. The K-IV water project is part of Karachi Bulk Water Supply Project.

The responsibility of implementation of K4 project was handed over to WAPDA by the federal government in October 2020. The WAPDA vowed to complete the project in minimum time of two years so that the citizens of Karachi can benefit from it. Like many other projects for Karachi, this project was once again delayed, till October 2023.

== Background ==
The project was first conceived in 2002, and the project’s feasibility studies and design were completed by Osmani & Company Limited (OCL). Estimates prepared by the consultants in 2007–08 based on the preliminary designs were reviewed by different tiers of provincial and federal governments and finally the project was approved for Rs.25.5 billion by ECNEC in the year 2011. Due to the negligence of federal and provincial governments during the span of decades, project costs have been increased from the original Rs.25.5 billion to Rs.150 billion and project work is still pending.

== Design ==
The total length of the Phase 1 of the project is 120 kilometres (75 mi), of which approximately 92 kilometres (57 mi) is canal, 10 kilometres are siphons, and approximately 8 kilometres are RCC conduits. There are 2 pump stations capable of pumping of 984,207 cubic metres per day each, and three filtration plants: one of 130 MGD and two of 65 MGD capacity. Karachi has been suffering from a severe water shortage for over a decade. The K-4 project initiated to solve Karachi's severe water crisis has not been completed yet. We present you with all we know about the long-pending project which can be the savior of Karachi's water issue.

== Construction ==
Construction is being carried out by the Frontier Works Organisation conglomerate. In November 2020, after taking responsibility to execute the project, WAPDA stopped working on the K-IV project by mentioning serious technical and design issues.

== See also ==
- Karachi Water and Sewerage Board
- Karachi Bulk Water Supply Project
- Water resources management in Pakistan
- Dams, water locks and canals of Pakistan
- Water supply and sanitation in Pakistan
