= 2015 Karachi local government elections =

Pakistani elections

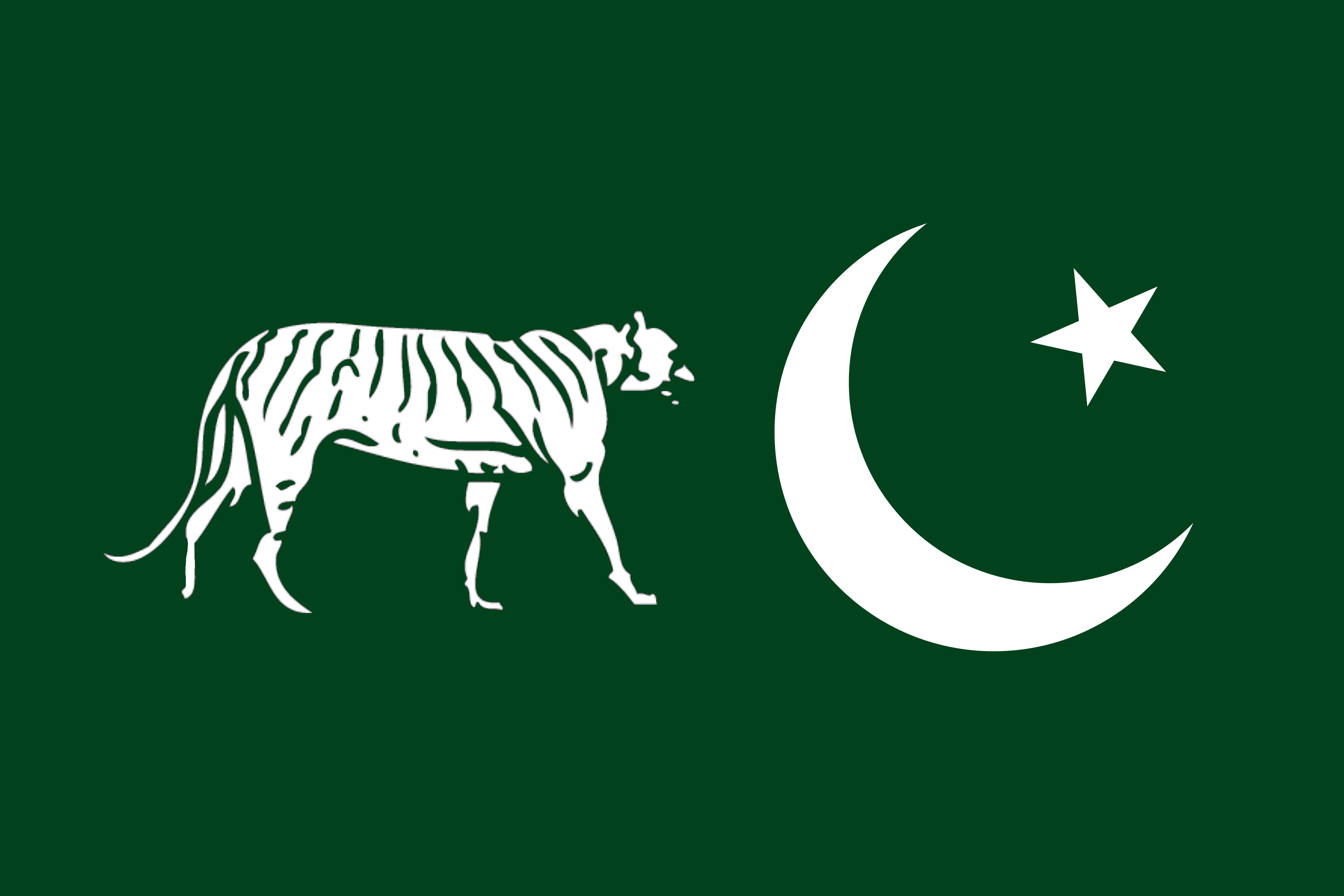
| Party | MQM | PPP | PML(N) |
| Percentage | 64.5% | 11.5% | 9.2% |
Mayor of Karachi before election
Syed Mustafa Kamal
MQM-L
Elected Mayor
Waseem Akhtar
MQM-L

2015 Karachi local government elections were the second Karachi local government elections to elect a mayor and a local council.

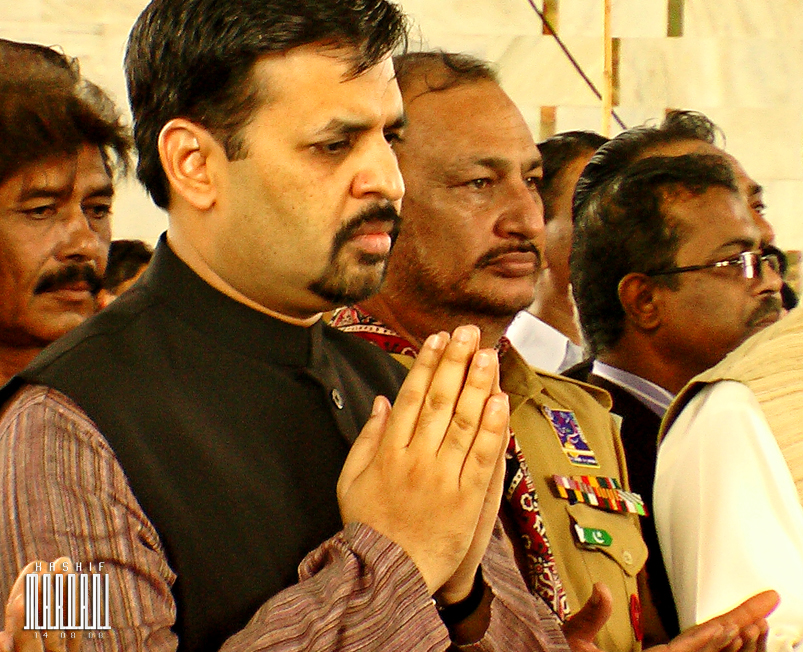
Syed Mustafa Kamal, the outgoing mayor

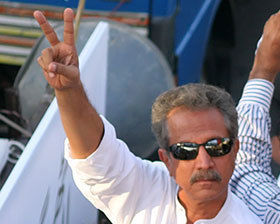
The new mayor Waseem Akhtar

== Voting ==
There were 209 union committees and 38 union councils in Karachi. Both union councils and union committees are similar in that they are territorial units and composition; the main difference between them is that the union committee represents an urban area whereas the union council represents the rural or suburban areas. Each union council has a union council chairman and one member of the district council. The chairman of each district is selected by the chairmen of union councils and union committees.

== Results ==
The following is the result of union committees in local government election held on 5 December 2015.

Karachi Local Government Election for Union committees, 2015
| # | Parties | KMC | Malir | East | West | Central | South | Korangi | Percentage |
|---|---|---|---|---|---|---|---|---|---|
| 1 | MQM-L | 135 | 1 | 20 | 21 | 50 | 10 | 33 | 64.5% |
| 2 | PPP | 24 | 5 | 4 | 4 | 1 | 10 | – | 11.5% |
| 3 | PMLN | 19 | 4 | 1 | 9 | – | 4 | 1 | 9.2% |
| 4 | PTI | 10 | – | 2 | 4 | – | 2 | 2 | 4.8% |
| 5 | JI | 7 | 1 | 2 | 3 | – | 1 | – | 3.5% |
| 6 | JUI(F) | 1 | 1 | – | – | – | – | – | 0.5% |
| 7 | ANP | 1 | – | – | 1 | – | – | – | 0.5% |
| 8 | IND | 1 | – | – | 1 | – | – | – | 0.5% |
| 9 | IND | 11 | 1 | 2 | 3 | – | 4 | 1 | 5.2% |
| Total | | 209 | 13 | 31 | 46 | 51 | 31 | 37 | 100% |
| Polled votes | | 2,517,265 | | | | | | | 36% |
| Total votes | | 6,972,454 | | | | | | | 100% |

There was a total of 99 seats reserved in four different categories for the union committees and all 308 members of the union committee select the mayor and deputy mayor of Karachi. The mayoral election was held on 24 August 2016. Waseem Akhtar was elected as the city's mayor by securing 196 out of 294 (305 total) votes in his favor. The Pakistan Peoples Party candidate secured second position with 98 votes.

The Pakistan Peoples Party won the majority of the seats in union councils. The following is the result of Karachi union councils in the local government election held on 5 December 2015.

Karachi Local Government Union council Election, 2015
| # | Parties | Total | Malir | West | Percentage |
|---|---|---|---|---|---|
| 1 | MQM-L | 0 | – | – | 0% |
| 2 | PPP | 19 | 16 | 3 | 50% |
| 3 | PMLN | 1 | 1 | – | 2.63% |
| 4 | PTI | 0 | – | – | 0% |
| 5 | JI | 0 | – | – | 0% |
| 6 | JUI(F) | 1 | 1 | – | 2.63% |
| 7 | ANP | 0 | – | – | 0% |
| 8 | IND | 1 | 1 | – | 2.63% |
| 9 | IND | 16 | 13 | 3 | 42.1% |
| Total | | 38 | 32 | 4 | 100% |

The election for the chairman of the District Council was held on 24 August 2016. In the district council elections, Abdullah Murad Baloch from the Pakistan Peoples Party received 35 votes out of 56 (57 total) and was elected as the District Council chairman.
