= Allah Bakhsh Gabol =

Pakistani politician

16th Mayor of Karachi
- In office Apr 1951 – 10 January 1953
- Preceded by: Hakeem Muhammad Ahsan
- Succeeded by: H.M. Habibullah Paracha

22nd Mayor of Karachi
- In office May 1961 – October 1962
- Preceded by: S.M.Taufiq
- Succeeded by: Abdul Sattar Afghani

Personal details
- Born: 15 August 1895 Karachi, British India
- Died: December 1972 (aged 77)
- Party: Congress before partition after 1945 Pakistan Muslim league.
- Children: Abdul Sattar Gabol
- Relatives: Nabil Gabol (grandson)
- Occupation: Politician

Khan Bahadur Allah Bakhsh Gabol (Urdu: خان بهادرالله بخش گبول) (15 August 1895 – December 1972) was a political leader of the 20th century and an exponent of the Pakistan Movement from Sindh. Allah Bakhsh Gabol was the son of a landlord Khudadad Khan Gabol, and the grandfather of Sardar Nabil Ahmed Gabol, who is a notable politician and nawab of Gabol tribe.

Gabol was the first Deputy Speaker of the Sindh Assembly, after the imposition of Government of India Act 1935. He defeated Haji Sir Abdullah Haroon in 1937 in the first election after Sindh was separated from Bombay. He was also twice elected the Mayor of the then Karachi Municipal Corporation in 1951 and 1961. It is now the Karachi Metropolitan Corporation. . Due to his outstanding status, he was awarded the title of Khan Bahadur by the British Empire and after the independence of Pakistan in 1947, he was awarded the Sitara i Imtiaz by President Ayub Khan in 1966. Thus he was considered to be an influential politician of Karachi of his times. Gabol was among the leadership of the Baloch League.

Preceded by Sardar Khudadad Khan Gabol	Head of Gabol Tribe –	Succeeded by Nabeel Gabol
