= Sohrab Katrak =

Parsi businessman and mayor of Karachi

Sohrab Kavasji Hormusji Katrak
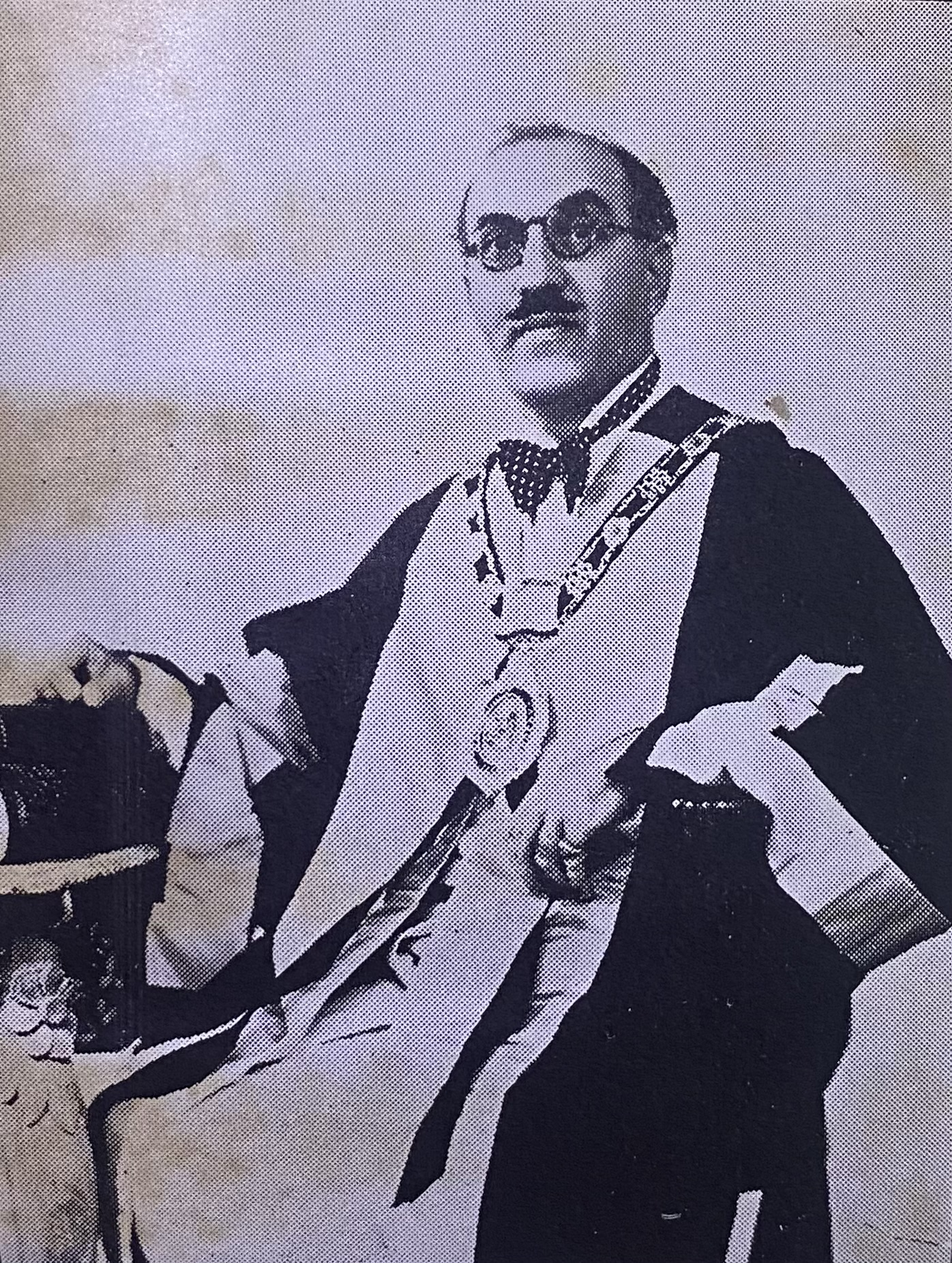

10th Mayor of Karachi
- In office 8 May 1942 – 11 May 1943
- Preceded by: Muhammad Hashim Gazdar
- Succeeded by: Shambo Nath Molraaj

Personal details
- Born: 26 November 1892 Karachi, Bombay and Sind, British India
- Died: 11 September 1972 (aged 79) Karachi, Sindh, Pakistan
- Spouse: Dina Madan
- Children: 2 sons and 3 daughters
- Parent: Khan Bahadur Kavasji Katrak (father)
- Education: Pitman's Metropolitan College
- Awards: Sitara-e-Khidmat (1963)

Sohrab Katrak (1892–1972) was a Parsi businessman and Mayor of Karachi from May 1942 to May 1943. He also authored several books, including Through Amanullah's Afghanistan. During the presidency of Ayub Khan, he served as his advisor.

== Early life ==
Sohrab Kavasji Hormusji Katrak was born on 26 November 1892 to Khan Bahadur Sir Kavasji Katrak (1855–1946) and Khorshed Banu Katrak. His father was knighted by George V. He had 5 sisters, including both Meherbai (who later wed Burjorji Mardan, son of Jamshedji Framji Madan) and Dinbai (a social worker, who married Hormasji Vajifdar). His father, began his career in 1874, aged 18 at Jamasji & Sons and thence relocated to Karachi in 1891. Katrak was educated at the Bai Virbaiji Soparivala Parsi High School in Karachi as well as Pitman's College in London.

== Career ==
In the 1920s, he developed the Sohrab Katrak Parsi Colony, as well as the Sohrab Katrak Park. In May 1942, he became the Mayor of Karachi. From 1947 to 1952, he was a trustee of the Karachi Parsi Anjuman Trust Fund. In 1950, he became a trustee to the International Islamic Economic Conference. He authored several books, including Through Amanullah's Afghanistan, which won him a place at the Royal Geographical Society. He also authored Who are the Parsees and Karachi: That was the capital of Sind.

== Personal life ==
In 1919, he married Dina Madan, the daughter of Jamshedji Framji Madan and his wife Pirojbai. Together, they had 2 sons and 3 daughters, Jamshed (died in 2008), who was the Head of the Department of Clearing and Forwarding at Katrak & Co. His second son, Homi was a Chartered Accountant in London. His eldest daughter, Khorshedbai was the wife of Jal Contractor. The second daughter, Perin was a social worker in Karachi. The youngest daughter, Vera, was an archaeologist (PhD University of London) who married Cowasjee Cowasjee, brother of Ardeshir Cowasjee. Katrak died in Karachi in 1972. He was survived by his wife.
