= Kavasji =

Kavasji is a given name. Notable people with the name include:

- Kavasji Katrak (1856-1946), Indian businessman
- Kavasji Palanji Khatau (1857–1916), Indian singer
- Kavasji Naegamvala, (1857-1938), Indian astrophysicist
- Kavasji Jamshedji Petigara (1877–1941), Indian police officer
