= KGA (disambiguation) =

KGA is a radio station in Spokane, Washington, U.S.

KGA may also refer to:

- Kananga Airport, an airport in Kananga, Kasai-Central Province, Democratic Republic of the Congo
- Karachi Goan Association, a social club in Karachi, Pakistan
- King's Gambit Accepted, chess opening
- Maninka language, Mande language group spoken in several West African states
