= Rahmat Hussain Jafferi =

Pakistani jurist (born 1945)

Rahmat Hussain Jafferi is a Pakistani jurist who served as a justice of the Sindh High Court from 2003 to 2009 and later as a justice of the Supreme Court of Pakistan from 2009 to 2010.

== Early life and education ==
Born in 1945 in Larkana, Sindh, he received his early education locally and later attended Government College Larkana, earning a B.A. degree. He obtained his LL.B. from Sindh Muslim Law College.

== Career ==
Jafferi began his legal career as an advocate at the Larkana Bar Association, working under his father, Fakir Muhammad Jafferi, a former district public prosecutor.

In 1972, Jafferi joined the Sindh judiciary as a civil judge and first-class magistrate. Later, he was elevated to senior civil judge, additional sessions judge, and district and sessions judge, serving in several districts of Sindh. He also served as registrar of the Sindh High Court and received training at the Federal Sharia Academy.

As a district and sessions judge in Hyderabad from 1992 to 1995, Jafferi separated the judiciary from the executive branch. On May 7, 1999, he was appointed as administrative judge of the Anti-Terrorism Courts in Karachi Division and later as administrative judge of the Accountability Courts in Sindh, Karachi. During his tenure, he decided several cases, including the Plane Hijacking case against Nawaz Sharif.

Jafferi was appointed as a judge of the Sindh High Court on August 27, 2002 on ad-hoc basis, and later became a permanent judge on August 27, 2003. He was elevated to the Supreme Court of Pakistan on September 7, 2009.

== Personal life ==
In 1974, Jafferi married the daughter of Z. A. Channa, a former judge and Secretary of the Ministry of Law, Justice and Human Rights Division.
