= Ian Fyfe (Pakistani journalist) =

Pakistani cricketer and journalist (died 2005)

- Born: 1946 or 1947
- Died: 5 August 2005 (aged 58); Karachi
- Occupation: Sports journalist
- Years active: 1975–2005
- Employer: Dawn

Ian Fyfe (born 1946 or 1947; died 5 August 2005) was a Pakistani cricketer, coach and sports journalist. He was educated at St Patrick's High School, Karachi. A bowler at St. Patrick's, under the eye of Jacob Harris, Fyfe was as a leading wicket taker for the Karachi Goan Association. He was among the top slow, left arm spinning bowlers of Karachi at that time. He worked as a playing coach for the Karachi Goan Association cricket team. Fyfe enjoyed serving as the Master of Ceremonies at weddings.

Fyfe worked as a senior sports reporter for Dawn for many years. He had earlier worked at the Morning News during the 1970s. He died from heart failure and complications from injuries in the Liaquat National Hospital on 5 August 2005 at age 58. He was on his way home on his scooter on 30 June when a car hit him on Shara-e-Faisal. The funeral service was held at Christ the King Church on 7 August 2005. A memorial was arranged by the Karachi Sports Forum at Karachi Goan Association Gymkhana on 19 August 2005.

== Snooker championship ==
Eight top snooker players in the country were to take part in the Ian Fyfe Memorial Snooker Championship 2005, a three-day event starting from 19 September 2005 at the Karachi Club. The club is organising the Rs100,000 event in remembrance of the late Ian Fyfe who was a popular sports reporter.

The third Ian Fyfe Memorial Inter-school Twenty20 cricket tournament started on 13 October 2011 at the Karachi Goan Association Gymkhana ground with 10 teams participating.

== Legacy ==
The Ian Fyfe Memorial Inter-school T20 Cricket tournament is still running in 2017, 12 years after Fyfe's death.
