= Jamshed Nusserwanjee Mehta =

First elected mayor of Karachi, Pakistan

1st Elected Mayor of Karachi
- In office 1933–1934
- Preceded by: Position established
- Succeeded by: Teakum Dass Vadhumull

President, Karachi Municipal Corporation
- In office 1924–1936

Councillor, Karachi Municipal Corporation
- In office 1918–1924

Personal details
- Born: 7 January 1886 Karachi, Sind, British India
- Died: 1 August 1952 (aged 66)
- Education: D. J. Sindh College

Jamshed Nusserwanjee Mehta (7 January 1886 – 1 August 1952) was a Pakistani politician. He was the first elected Mayor of Karachi from 1933 to 1934, and is still remembered as the "Maker of Modern Karachi" (Baba-e-Karachi). He was also a notable figure in the Pakistan Boy Scouts Association.

== Early life and education ==
Jamshed Nusserwanjee Mehta was born on 7 January 1886 to a well-off Parsi family in Karachi, Sindh, British India. After finishing his early education at Parsi Rabadi School, He joined D. J. Sindh College, later known as D. J. Sindh Government Science College in 1900. His father was already an affluent businessman of Karachi Parsi community and owned large businesses which included a retail shop at Elphinstone Street, later renamed as Zaibunnisa Street. His father also owned a salt factory, a tile factory, a flour mill, an ice factory and a wholesale shop for groceries and liquor. Jamshed wanted to join the family business to fulfill his father's wishes. He then went to Daver's Commercial College, Bombay for training in business management. On his return, he joined the family firm, Nusserwanji & Co.

== Career ==
In 1918, Mehta was elected a councillor of the Karachi Municipal Corporation and served in that position for six years. He was soon elected the President of the Corporation. He served in that capacity for 12 years from April 1922 to October 1933. Then he was elected to become the first Mayor of Karachi from 1933 to 1934 in British India.

He transformed the city into a great and important metropolis during his 19 years period of active role as a local politician (1918–1934) from a fishing village to a well-planned city. There was a lot of social and economic development in Karachi during his time. People who lived during this time remembered that the streets of Karachi were washed twice a day and achieved the status of cleanest city in the East.

He was a member of the Sindh Legislative Assembly, the father of Scouting in Sindh, and one of the founder members of the Boy Scout Movement in India, and later on in Pakistan. He was the Deputy Chief Commissioner of the GHQ and its Honorary Treasurer. Pakistan's Sea Scout landing craft is named after him.

Jamshed Quarters was developed by Jamshed Nusserwanjee Mehta in 1922.

== Memorials ==
A commemorative postage stamp of Rs. 3 was issued by the Pakistan Post Office on 7 January 1988. Jamsheed Memorial Hall, named after him, is located on M. A. Jinnah Road, Karachi.
