= Abdul Khaliq Allahwala =

Abdul Khaliq Allahwala was a Pakistani politician who served as a member of the Provincial Assembly of West Pakistan from 1965 to 1969, representing Karachi-VI. Later, he served as the deputy mayor of Karachi from 1983 to 1987.
