= Z. A. Channa =

Z. A. Channa was a Pakistani jurist who served as a judge of the Sindh High Court from 1972 to 1979.

== Biography ==
Channa obtained his master's degree and law degree from Aligarh Muslim University. He began his legal career as a junior lawyer under Qazi Khuda Bakhsh in 1941. Channa entered the civil service after passing the Provincial Civil Service (PCS) examination and was appointed as a civil judge in Mehar in 1946.

In 1948, Channa was appointed Additional City Magistrate in Karachi. He worked in the Law Department of the West Pakistan Government in Lahore from 1957 to 1970, where he drafted the West Pakistan Land Revenue Act and Services Rules.

Channa was instrumental in drafting the Provisional Constitution of Pakistan while serving as joint secretary in the Ministry of Law in Islamabad from 1972 to 1973. He also authored the Law Reforms Ordinance of 1972, advocating for the separation of the judiciary from the executive. He was appointed to the Sindh High Court on October 2, 1972, and served as the Federal Law Secretary from 1974 to 1976.

He returned to the Sindh High Court in 1976 until his retirement on May 19, 1979. In 1992, Channa became the director general of the Sindh Judicial Academy, a position he held for ten years until his retirement in September 2002 for health reasons.
