= NA-239 Karachi South-I =

Constituency of the National Assembly of Pakistan

- Constituency for the National Assembly of Pakistan
- Region: Lyari Town (partly) of Karachi South in Karachi
- Electorate: 422,081

Current constituency
- Party: PPP
- Member: Nabil Gabol
- Created from: NA-248 Karachi-X

NA-239 Karachi South-I (این اے-239، کراچی جنوبی-1) is a constituency for the National Assembly of Pakistan that encompasses Lyari.

== Assembly Segments ==
Constituency number	Constituency	District	Current MPA	Party
106	PS-106 Karachi South-I	Karachi South District	Sajjad Ali Soomro	PTI

== Members of Parliament ==
=== 2018–2023: NA-246 Karachi South-I ===
Election	Member	Party
2018	Abdul Shakoor Shad	PTI

=== 2024–present: NA-239 Karachi South-I ===
Election	Member	Party
2024	Nadir Gabol	PPP

== Election 2002 ==
General elections were held on 10 October 2002. Nabeel Gabol of PPP won by 32,424 votes.

General election 2002: NA-248 Karachi South-X
Party	Candidate	Votes	%	±%
PPP	Nabil Gabol	32,424	45.35	
MMA	Dr. Naseeruddin Sawati	14,700	20.56	
PST	Abdul Karim Nakshbandi	7,882	11.03	
MQM	Sohrab Nizamani	4,825	6.75	
PPP(SB)	Imtiaz Ali	4,159	5.82	
PML(N)	Shaikh Maqsood Ahmed	3,363	4.70	
NA	Ali Muhammad Shaheen Korai	2,174	3.04	
Others	Others (six candidates)	1,967	2.75	
Turnout		72,594	32.20	
Total valid votes		71,494	98.49	
Rejected ballots		1,100	1.51	
Majority		17,724	24.79	
Registered electors		225,479		

== Election 2008 ==
General elections were held on 18 February 2008. Nabeel Gabol of PPP won by 84,217 votes.

General election 2008: NA-248 Karachi South-X
Party	Candidate	Votes	%	±%
PPP	Nabil Gabol	84,217	80.54	
Independent	Shakoor Shad	9,651	9.23	
MQM	Wasiullah Lakhoo	6,326	6.05	
PML(N)	Shaikh Maqsood Ahmed	3,888	3.72	
Others	Others (five candidates)	483	0.46	
Turnout		106,414	30.29	
Total valid votes		104,565	98.26	
Rejected ballots		1,849	1.74	
Majority		74,566	71.23	
Registered electors		351,345		
PPP hold				

== Election 2013 ==
General elections were held on 11 May 2013. Shahjahan Baloch of PPP won by 84,530 votes and became the member of National Assembly.

General election 2013: NA-248 Karachi South-X
Party	Candidate	Votes	%	±%
PPP	Shah Jahan Baloch	84,530	63.09	
PTI	Subhan Ali	26,348	19.67	
JUI (F)	Shirin Muhammad	9,054	6.76	
MQM	Nabil Gabol	6,489	4.84	
Independent	Muhammad Rafique S/O Ahmed	6,326	4.72	
Others	Others (eight candidates)	1,233	0.92	
Turnout		136,080	46.05	
Total valid votes		133,980	98.46	
Rejected ballots		2,100	1.54	
Majority		58,182	43.42	
Registered electors		295,536		
PPP hold				

== Election 2018 ==
General elections were held on 25 July 2018.

General election 2018: NA-246 Karachi South-I
Party	Candidate	Votes	%	±%
PTI	Abdul Shakoor Shad	52,750	25.97	
TLP	Ahmed	42,345	20.85	
PPP	Bilawal Bhutto Zardari	39,325	19.36	
MMA	Maulana Noorul Haq	33,078	16.29	
PML(N)	Saleem Zia	19,077	9.39	
Others	Others (eleven candidates)	16,534	8.14	
Turnout		206,577	38.49	
Total valid votes		203,109	98.32	
Rejected ballots		3,468	1.68	
Majority		10,405	5.12	
Registered electors		536,688		
PTI gain from PPP				

== Election 2024 ==
General elections were held on 8 February 2024. Nabil Gabol won the election with 40,027 votes.

General election 2024: NA-239 Karachi South-I
Party	Candidate	Votes	%	±%
PPP	Nabil Gabol	40,027	30.98	▲11.62
PTI	Muhammad Yasir (Note: Filed nomination papers as PTI candidate but ECP allowed him to run as an Independent)	37,285	28.85	▲2.88
JI	Fazal Ur Rehman Niazi	22,377	17.32	N/A
TLP	Muhammad Sharjil Goplani	14,761	11.42	▼9.43
JUI (F)	Moulana Noor Ul Haq	11,813	9.14	N/A
Others	Others (fourteen candidates)	2,959	2.29	
Turnout		131,786	31.22	▼7.27
Total valid votes		129,222	98.05	
Rejected ballots		2,564	1.95	
Majority		2,742	2.12	
Registered electors		422,081		
PPP gain from TLP				

== See also ==
- NA-238 Karachi East-IV
- NA-240 Karachi South-II
