= Manuel Misquita =

Pakistani politician

Manuel Misquita was a Pakistani politician who was a former Mayor of Karachi under British India and served as the president of the Karachi Goan Association.

== Mayor ==
Misquita was elected Mayor of Karachi in 1945 becoming the first and to date its only Catholic mayor.

== Karachi Goan Association ==
Misquita twice served as president of the Karachi Goan Association, first time from 1941 to 1942 and then again in 1954.
