= Mayor of Karachi =

Head of local government of Karachi, Pakistan

- ناظم کراچی
- Incumbent; Murtaza Wahab since 15 June 2023
- Karachi Metropolitan Corporation
- Residence: 'Camp Office' KDA Scheme 1, Gulshan-e-Iqbal
- Seat: KMC Building
- Appointer: Karachi Metropolitan Corporation
- Term length: 4 years
- Constituting instrument: Karachi City Municipal Act
- Formation: Nov 1933
- Final holder: Waseem Akhtar
- Deputy: Salman Murad, Deputy Mayor of Karachi
- Website: kmc.gos.pk

Mayor of Karachi (Urdu: ناظم کراچی; Sindhi: ميئر ڪراچي) is the executive of the Karachi metropolitan corporation and the Karachi local government system of the city of Karachi, which is the third tier of governance in Pakistan after federal and provincial governments.

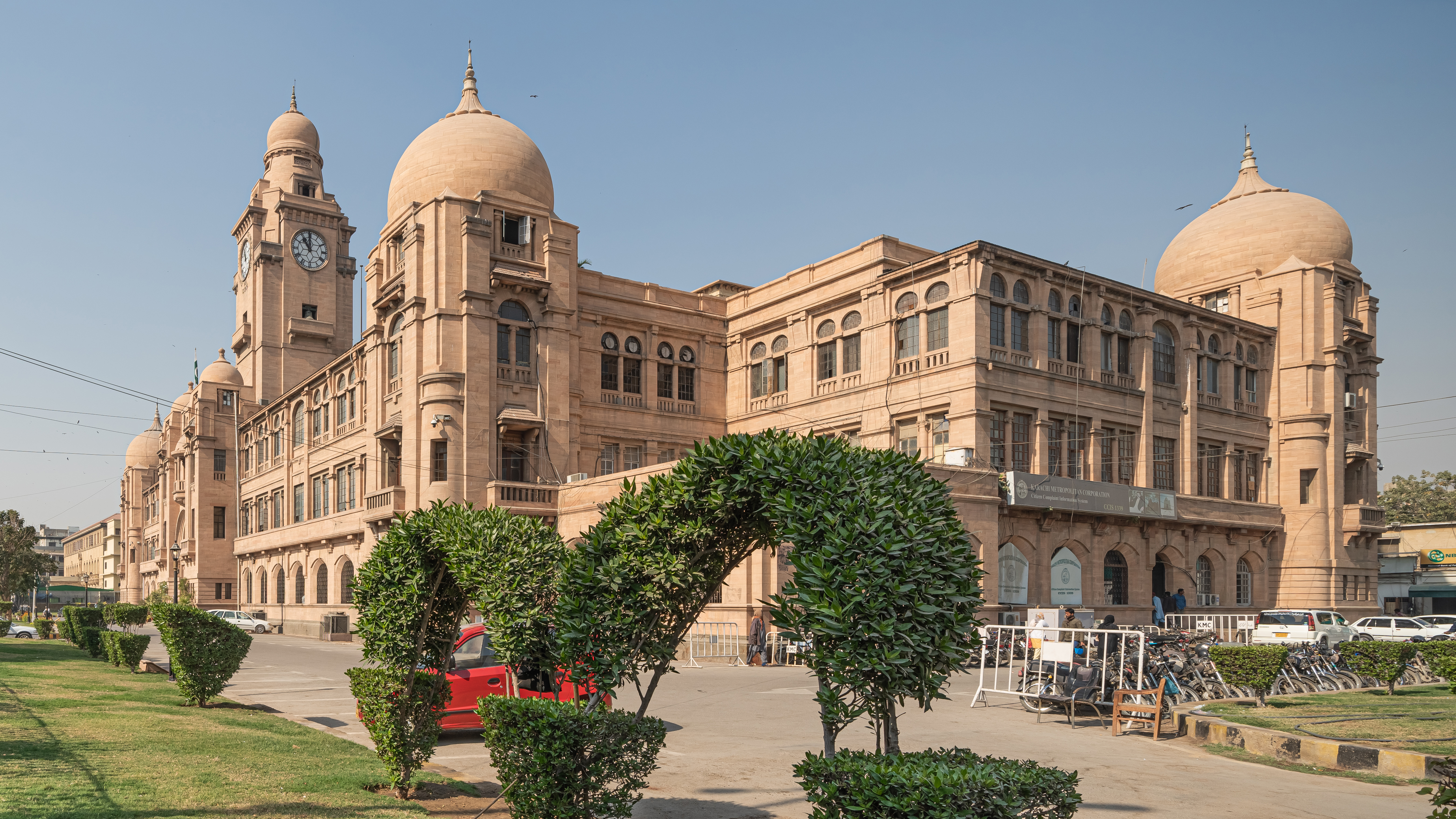
Karachi Metropolitan Corporation Building (KMC) completed in 1932 houses the city counsel hall for seating of general counsel meeting for 367 elected counselors and the offices of the Mayor and Deputy Mayor

== History ==
=== Ancient local government system in South Asia ===
The history of Karachi dates back to ancient periods. Before the Christian era, various towns and cities existed near the present day Karachi such as Barbarikon, Debal, and Banbhore. Local government system in the Indian subcontinent dates back to Mauryan empire or earlier. Public drains and sewage system, solid waste management, public dust bins, and street lamps at Mohenjo Daro indicate the presence of municipal organizations and services. During the Mauryan empire, a council of thirty commissioners was divided into six committees or boards which governed the city of Pataliputra and handled affairs such as fixing wages, controlling manufacturing and supplies, arrangement of foreign dignitaries, tourists and foreigners, handling records and registrations, collection of sales taxes, trade regulation, issuing licenses for weights and measurements, and municipal responsibilities. During ancient times, the Mayor of the city was called Nagarika and in the medieval periods, Kotwals came to administer major towns and cities. The mayors were appointed by the King rather than being elected. The Panchayat (assembly of five elders) system traced in the Rig Veda back to 1200 BC (Alok 2006).

=== British Indian Empire ===
The first local government elections in Karachi were held on 1 November 1884 and Karachi municipality was authorized to elect its president. Jamshed Nusserwanji Mehta became the first elected mayor of Karachi in 1933 when Karachi municipal corporation was first created from Karachi municipal committee, he served as the president of the Karachi municipal committee for 20 years prior. Owing to multiethnic composition, the different religious groups took turns as mayors of Karachi such as Parsis, Muslims, Hindus and Christians until the Independence of Pakistan in 1947.

=== Post Independence ===
First unofficial party based mayors were elected during the era of Zia ul Haq and Jamaat-e-Islami politician Abdul Sattar Afghani became the first mayor of Karachi with predominant political representation though the mayors remained unauthoritative. During the presidential rule of Gen. Pervez Musharraf, the local governments were reinstated with much better powers and control, which lasted until 2010. Under directives of Pakistan Supreme court in 2016, the local government system was revived but the provincial amendments to the local government act diminished the mayoral authority which once again became superficial and powerless.

== Administrative divisions ==
The current Karachi Local Government System follows Sindh Local Government Act 2013 (SLGA 2013)

The Karachi Local Government consists of Karachi Metropolitan Corporation which is subdivided into 25 Town Municipal Corporations (TMCs) which are headed by a chairman and a vice chairman. Each town is further divided into union committees (UCs) for a total of 246 union committees in Karachi which are headed by a chairman and a vice chairman as well. Each union committee is further subdivided into four wards. The local government elections directly elect the UC chairman/vice chairman panel and the 4 ward members of each UC. There are reserved seats for women, non-Muslim minorities, youth members, labor and transgender people in a union committee, all of which are indirectly elected by the direct election of chairman/vice chairman panel. There are 121 reserved seats in the city council.

The chairman of a union committee belongs to the city council (KMC) and elects the mayor/deputy mayor candidate, while the vice chairman of a union committee elects the chairman/vice chairman of the Town Municipal corporation (TMC).

246 union committee seats alongside 121 reserved seats make up the city council of 367 seats.

== The City Hall ==
The historic and iconic building of Karachi Metropolitan Corporation (KMC) houses the offices of mayor and deputy mayor of the city and the city council hall with 367 members (union committee chairmen). The foundation of the building was laid in 1927 and the construction was completed in 1930. The cost of building was 1,725,000 RS.

KDA Scheme 1 in Gulshan-e-Iqbal 'Camp Office' is the official residence for the Deputy Mayor of Karachi.

== List of mayors ==
=== Mayors of Karachi (1933–1962) ===
Karachi mayors were elected through Karachi Municipal Corporation elections or appointed.

List of mayors of Karachi (1933–1962)
No	Name of nazim	Starting term	Ending term	Notes
1	Jamshed Nusserwanji Mehta	November 1933	August 1934	First Mayor of Karachi, 1st Parsi mayor
2	Teakum Dass Vadhumull	30 August 1934	3 May 1935	First Hindu mayor of the city
3	Qazi Khuda Bukhsh	3 May 1935	9 May 1936	First Muslim mayor of the city
4	Ardeshir H. Mama	9 May 1936	4 May 1937	2nd Parsi mayor
5	Durgadas Advani	4 May 1937	6 May 1938	Amil Sindhi business magnate
6	Hatim Ali Alavi	6 May 1938	5 May 1939	
7	R.K. Sidhwa	5 May 1939	7 May 1940	
8	Lalji Malhootra	7 May 1940	6 May 1941	
9	Muhammad Hashim Gazdar	6 May 1941	8 May 1942	
10	Sohrab Katrak	8 May 1942	11 May 1943	Parsi historian and author
11	Shambo Nath Molraaj	11 May 1943	10 May 1944	
12	Yousaf Abdullah Haroon	10 May 1944	8 May 1945	son of Sir Abdullah Haroon
13	Manuel Misquita	8 May 1945	1 May 1946	First Christian mayor of Karachi, former president of Goan Pakistani
14	Wishram Das Dewan Das	9 May 1946	9 May 1947	
15	Hakeem Muhammad Ahsan	9 May 1947	25 May 1948	
16	Ghulam Ali Alana	25 May 1948	8 July 1948	1st post- independence mayor of the city, Biographer of founder of Pakistan
17	Allah Bakhsh Gabol (1st term)	Apr 1951	10 January 1953	Grandfather of politician Nabil Gabol
18	H.M. Habibullah Paracha (first term)	1953	1954	Grandfather of Habib Paracha (an American-Pakistani film-maker)
19	Mahmoud Haroon	19 January 1954	26 May 1955	Founder Editor of Khaleej Times and second son of Sir Abdullah Haroon
20	Al-Haj Malik Bagh Ali	26 May 1955	29 May 1956	
21	Siddique Wahab	30 May 1956	14 December 1956	
22	S.M.Taufiq	14 June 1958	14 October 1958	
23	Allah Bakhsh Gabol (2nd term)	May 1961	October 1962	
Administrator system (1962–1979)

=== Mayors of Karachi (1979 – present) ===
Former President of Pakistan Zia ul Haq conducted first popular local government elections in 1979 which were non party based but the parties still fielded their candidates. The victorious mayor Abdul Sattar Afghani was affiliated with Jamaat-e-Islami.

List of mayors of Karachi (since 1979)
No	Name of nazim	Deputy Mayor (Naib Nazim)	Starting term	Ending term	Party	Notes
24	Abdul Sattar Afghani (1st term)	Umer Yousuf Deda	9 November 1979	7 November 1983	JI	Non-partisan Local govt by Gen. Zia, KMC established its subsidiary body the Karachi Water & Sewerage Board in 1983.
25	Abdul Sattar Afghani (2nd term)	Abdul Khaliq Allahwala	7 November 1983	14 February 1987	JI	Abdul Sattar Afghani was arrested by police under section 144 when he was leading the councilor's procession outside the Sindh Assembly building. The elected council was then suspended and Saeed Ahmed Siddiqui was appointed as the administrator of KMC.
Administrator System implemented from 1987–1988
26	Farooq Sattar	Abdul Razik Khan	9 January 1988	27 July 1992	MQM-L	Youngest Mayor of the world at the age of 28. The elected council of KMC was suspended in July 1992, just after a month when an operation clean-up was launched by the federal government in Karachi in June 1992, and replaced the Mayor with an administrator, appointed by the government.
Administrator System implemented from 1992–2001
27	Naimatullah Khan	Muhammad Tariq Hassan	14 August 2001	June 2005	JI	Non-partisan City District govt 2001–2010 by Gen. Musharraf, under Sindh Local Government Ordinance (SLGO) 2001. He resigned from his office in June 2005.
28	Syed Mustafa Kamal	Nasreen Jalil	17 October 2005	February 2010	MQM-L	
Commissioner System implemented from 2010–2016
29	Waseem Akhtar	Arshad Abdullah Vohra	30 August 2016	29 August 2020	MQM-P	First party based Local elections of Pakistan, under Sindh Local Govt Act (SLGA 2013). Arshad Vohra served as acting mayor Aug, 30 2016 to Nov, 16 2016 before release of Waseem Akhtar. Vohra was removed when he joined PSP in 2018.
29	Waseem Akhtar	Arshad Hassan	30 August 2016	29 August 2020	MQM-P	First party based Local elections of Pakistan, under Sindh Local Govt Act (SLGA 2013). Arshad Vohra served as acting mayor Aug, 30 2016 to Nov, 16 2016 before release of Waseem Akhtar. Vohra was removed when he joined PSP in 2018.
Administrator system implemented from 30 August 2020 – 5 January 2023
30	Murtaza Wahab	Salman Abdullah Murad	15 June 2023	13 June 2027	PPP	

== Election ==
The most recent local government elections were held in 2023 and mayor elections took place through voting of chairmen of union committees (members of KMC) on 15 June 2023. Murtaza Wahab, mayoral candidate of PPP was elected as the mayor of Karachi.

Karachi Mayor Election, 2023
#	Party	Candidate	KMC	Percentage
1	Pakistan Peoples Party	Murtaza Wahab	173	47.1%
2	Jamaat-e-Islami	Hafiz Naeem ur Rehman	160	43.5%
3	Tehreek-e-Insaf	Khurrum Sher Zaman	34	9.4%
Total			367	100%

== Authority and functions ==
KMC's functions include flyovers, storm water drains (nullahs), special development programmes, maintenance work, municipal watch and ward, fire fighting services, civil defense, traffic engineering, management of milk supply schemes, encroachment management on its land and properties, celebration of national days, reception of foreign dignitaries/distinguished guests.

106 roads & arterial thoroughfares of Karachi, 38 flyovers and 37 storm water drains (nullahs) of Karachi come under KMC's control. Alongside that, KMC also controls and manages 7 medical institutes/hospitals in Karachi, including: Karachi Medical and Dental College (KMDC), Karachi institute of Heart disease (KIHD), Abbasi Shaheed Hospital, Sobhraj Maternity Home, Sarfaraz Shaheed Hospital, Spencer’s Eye Hospital and Leprosy Hospital. KMC is also responsible for maintaining Zoological Gardens, Safari Parks, Aquariums, Sports Complexes, Beeches, Art Galleries, Museums and Metropolitan Libraries under its jurisdiction.

The mayor of Karachi is also the chairman of the Karachi Water and Sewerage Board (KWSB) and the divisional board of the Sindh Solid Waste Management Board for Karachi.

Major municipal institutes like Karachi Development Authority (KDA), Lyari Development Authority (LDA), Malir Development Authority (MDA), Sindh Mass Transit Authority and the Sindh Building Control Authority (SBCA) are still under the provincial government which restricts the control of KMC over the city and limits the powers of a mayor.

== Budget ==
Karachi budget formulated by its mayors during first and last years of their tenure.

Budget of Karachi under mayorship (1979–2020)
Fiscal Year	Amount (Rs. Billion)	Amount ($. Million)	Mayor	Administrator	Notes
1979–80	0.459		Abdul Sattar Afghani		
1984–85	1.127	83.4	sic	-	
1987–88			sic		
1988–89	1.936	105	Farooq Sattar		revenues grew at an average rate of 11 per year from 1988 to 1992, well below the nominal growth of Karachi (ADB study).
1991–92	2.841	115	sic		revenues grew at an average rate of 11 per year from 1988 to 1992, well below the nominal growth of Karachi (ADB study).
2001-02	5.7		Naimatullah Khan	-	
2004-05	43.8	740	sic	-	
2006-07	44.2	730	Mustafa Kamal	-	
2009-10	52.36	610	sic	-	
2017–18	27.1	251	Waseem Akhter	-	
2020–21	24.8	150	sic	-	

== See also ==
- List of mayors of Pakistan
- Commissioner Karachi Division
- Karachi Metropolitan Corporation
- Administrator of Karachi
- Karachi Development Authority
- Karachi Water and Sewerage Board
- Lyari Development Authority
- Malir Development Authority
