= Dumlottee Wells =

The Dumlottee Wells, also known as Dumlottee Conduit, is a defunct water supply system in Karachi. It was the inaugural water supply system in Karachi, established in British India-era.

== History ==
Dumlottee Wells were constructed by British Indian engineers in the 19th century. The system originally comprised 15 wells, excavated along the Malir River to provide a reliable water supply for the burgeoning city.

Throughout the British colonial period, the conduit underwent two significant development phases. The first, commenced in 1881, involved the construction of several wells near the Dumlottee section of the river. This phase enabled the delivery of 18,927 cubic metres of water daily to Karachi Cantonment. Additionally, filtration galleries, engineered to facilitate efficient water transfer, were installed to ensure an uninterrupted supply to the city.

The second phase, initiated in 1923, included the establishment of additional wells, boosting the city's water supply by 56,781 cubic metres. Historical records indicate the creation of 16 wells at Dumlottee, designed to provide 75,708 cubic metres per day (MGD) of water to Karachi. A 32-kilometre conduit was also constructed in the same year.

The ancient conduit spans multiple areas, including Al-Hilal Society, Aziz Bhatti Park, Civil Lines, Dumlottee, Gulshan Block 6, Mashriq Centre, Karachi University, Malir Cantonment, NIPA Chowrangi, Old Sabzi Mandi, and Safoora Chowrangi.

While it was once a vital water source for various parts of Karachi, only one well currently operates, furnishing Gadap Town with 1,892 cubic metres of water daily. The Dumlottee Conduit draws its water supply from Keenjhar Lake.
