= Waseem Akhtar =

Former Mayor of Karachi (born 1955)

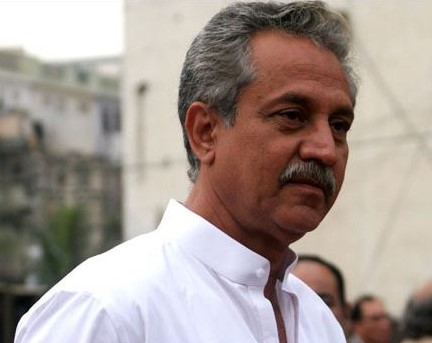

29th Mayor of Karachi
- In office 30 August 2016 – 29 August 2020
- Deputy: Arshad Abdullah Vohra
- Preceded by: Syed Mustafa Kamal
- Succeeded by: Murtaza Wahab

Pakistani Parliamentarian from Karachi, Sindh
- In office May 2008 – May 2013

Personal details
- Born: Karachi, Sindh, Pakistan
- Party: PTI (2026-present)
- Other political affiliations: MQM-P (2016-2026); MQM-L (1987-2016)
- Occupation: Politician
- Profession: Telecommunication Engineer,

Waseem Akhtar (Urdu: وسیم اختر; born 25 November 1955) is a Pakistani politician of the Muttahida Quami Movement (P). He served as the Mayor of Karachi, Pakistan's largest city, from 2016 to 2020. Shortly after his nomination as Mayor, he was controversially arrested for what his supporters saw as political reasons.

Akhtar worked as a telecommunication engineer for AT&T in Saudi Arabia for ten years. After returning to Pakistan, he started a radio sets and telephone sets assembly business, which later expanded to pharmaceutical distribution.

== Early life and career ==
Some sources state that he completed his school education in Harnai, Balochistan. After that, he finished his degree in telecommunication engineering.

== Personal life ==
Akhtar belongs to an Urdu-speaking Muslim Rajput family. He is the son of Akhter Muhammad Khan. He runs a real estate business. He is married and has six children.

== Political career ==
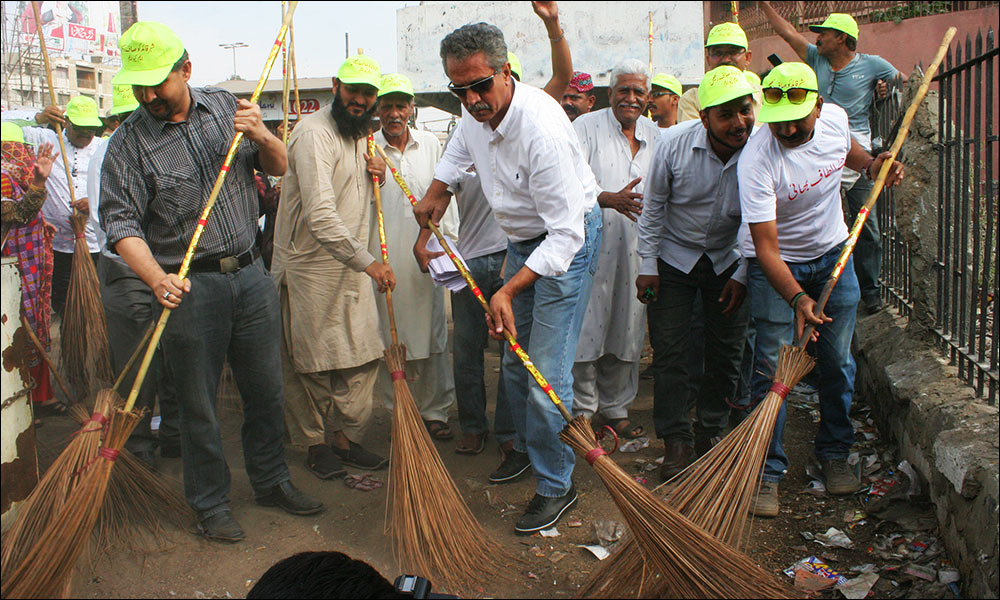
Waseem Akhtar during 2016 electoral campaign.

=== Mayor of Karachi ===
In 1987, he joined Muttahida Qaumi Movement. He is currently a senior member of MQM.

After the 2015 Karachi local government elections, Akhtar became the Mayor of Karachi on 24 August 2016. He took oath as Karachi mayor on 30 August 2016.

== Arrest ==
Akhtar was arrested based on a Joint Investigation Team report on Asim Hussain. These reports, according to legal experts, are inadmissible in courts. The Anti-Terror Court which would try him has also been declared as "unjust and ineffective" by the International Commission of Jurists.

Akhter was arrested shortly after his nomination papers for the Mayor of Karachi were accepted by the Election Commission of Pakistan (which requires that a candidate have no criminal record). Since he was nominated mayor of Karachi, unknown persons registered FIR against him in the District of Malir, home of then Senior Superintendent of Police Rao Anwar, who would later be suspended by the government. The Anti-Terror Court ordered his arrest, which seems part of chain of political crackdown against MQM, which has blamed the law enforcement agencies for transgressing their authority and extrajudicially killing many MQM workers, including Aftab Ahmed, a former coordinator for Farooq Sattar. Akhtar also alleges that the court needlessly delayed his bail by not hearing his bail case.

=== Charges ===
Charges against Akhtar included that he listened to speeches by MQM founder Altaf Hussain and clapped. He is also accused of recommending people to Asim Hussain for medical treatment.

=== Fake confession reports ===
Pakistani media ran reported that Akhtar had confessed to murder, but his lawyers presented a signed letter from his jail declaring the reports to be false. Akhtar later himself appeared on the media and rejected the fake confession reports.

MQM has also alleged that law enforcement agencies were pressuring Akhtar to withdraw as the mayor of Karachi. Some analysts opined that Akhtar was not being provided a fair trial.

=== Fake receipts in Asim case ===
Journalist Shahzaib Khanzada revealed that Rangers had submitted forged medical receipts intended to show that Akhtar had recommended alleged terrorists receive treatment from Asim. All of the receipts belonged to innocent residents (the receipts and addresses were authentic, but names had been changed).

=== Amnesty International ===
Amnesty International published a report stating that the life of Akhtar while in detention might be in danger because of torture and ill treatment by the law enforcement agencies.

=== Release from jail ===
Akhtar was released from detention on 16 November 2016 after getting bail on all 39 cases.
