= Water supply and sanitation in Pakistan =

Data
- Water coverage (broad definition): 99% (2024)
- Access to at least basic sanitation: 71% (2024)
- Continuity of supply: Mostly intermittent in urban areas
- Average urban water use (L/person/day): Karachi: 197 (2001)
- Average urban water and sanitation tariff (US$/m^{3}): Karachi: 0.09 (2012)
- Share of household metering: Low
- Annual investment in WSS: Scheduled: US$2.66 per capita (2005–2010)
- Share of self-financing by utilities: Low

Institutions
- Decentralization to municipalities: Yes, since 2001
- National water and sanitation company: None
- Water and sanitation regulator: None
- Responsibility for policy setting: Ministry of Climate Change (formerly called Ministry of Environment)
- Sector law: None

Drinking water supply and sanitation in Pakistan is characterized by some achievements and many challenges. In 2024, 72% Pakistanis had access to the basic sanitation facilities. Despite high population growth, the country has increased the share of the population with access to an improved water source from 85% in 1990 to 92% in 2010, although this does not necessarily mean that the water from these sources is safe to drink. The share with access to improved sanitation increased from 27% to 38% during the same period, according to the Joint Monitoring Program for Water Supply and Sanitation. There has also been considerable innovation at the grass-root level, in particular concerning sanitation. The Orangi Pilot Project in Karachi and community-led total sanitation in rural areas are two examples of such innovation.

However, the sector still faces major challenges. The quality of the services is poor, as evidenced by intermittent water supply in urban areas and limited wastewater treatment. Poor drinking water quality and sanitation lead to major outbreaks of waterborne diseases such as those that swept the cities of Faisalabad, Karachi, Lahore and Peshawar in 2006. Estimates indicate that each year, more than three million Pakistanis become infected with waterborne diseases. In addition, many service providers do not even cover the costs of operation and maintenance due to low tariffs and poor efficiency. Consequently, the service providers strongly depend on government subsidies and external funding. A National Sanitation Policy and a National Drinking Water Policy were passed in 2006 and 2009 respectively with the objective to improve water and sanitation coverage and quality. However, the level of annual investment (US$4/capita) still remains much below what would be necessary to achieve a significant increase in access and service quality. Pakistan is currently grappling with a critical water crisis, transitioning swiftly from a state of water "stressed" to water "scarce." The annual water availability per person has plummeted below 1,000 cubic metres, possibly surpassing this threshold already. To put it in perspective, this means that the yearly water allocation for each individual in Pakistan would not even fill half of an Olympic swimming pool.

== Access ==
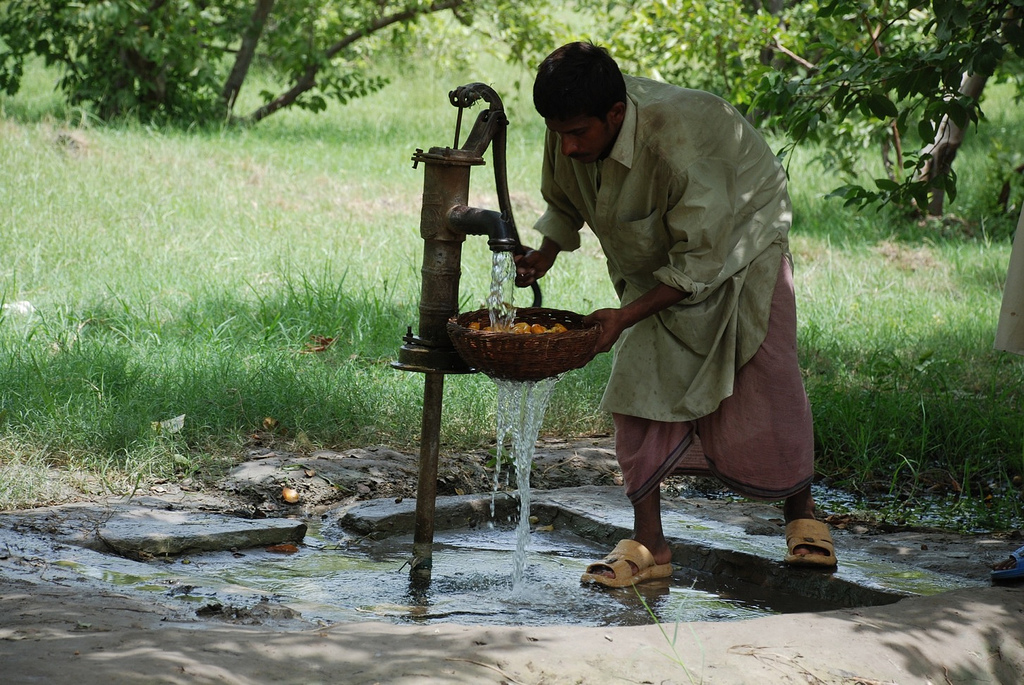
Hand pump in rural Pakistan

Pakistan is the fifteenth most water stressed country in the world.

In 2020, according to the World Bank data 68% Pakistanis have access to the basic sanitation facilities.

In 2015, 91% of the population had access to an "improved" water supply. This was 94% of the population in urban areas and 90% of the population in rural areas. In 2015, there were still around 16 million people lacking access to "improved" water. As for sanitation, in 2015, 64% of the population had access to "improved" sanitation. This was 83% of the population in urban areas and 51% of the population in rural areas. There were still around 69 million people lacking access to "improved" sanitation.

In Pakistan, according to the Joint Monitoring Program for Water Supply and Sanitation of the World Health Organization and UNICEF, access in Pakistan to an improved water source increased from 85% in 1990 to 92% in 2010. In the same time, improved sanitation coverage increased from 27% to 48%.

Access to water and sanitation in Pakistan (2020)
		Urban (37% of the population)	Rural (63% of the population)	Total
Water	Safely Managed Drinking Water	40%	33%	36%
Water	Basic Drinking Water	53%	55%	54%
Sanitation	Basic Sanitation	82%	60%	68%
Sanitation	Limited Sanitation	17%	28%	25%

According to the Pakistan Social And Living Standards Measurement Survey of 2010–2012, the main source of drinking water was as follows: 32% tap water, 28% hand pump, 27% motor pump, 4% dug well and 9% others. Assuming that other sources are identical to unimproved water sources, access to an improved water source was 91%, almost identical to the 2010 figure estimated by the JMP. For sanitation, the survey estimates that 66% had a flush toilet, 15% a non-flush toilet and 18% had no toilet at all. If all toilets were considered to be a form of improved sanitation, access according to this estimate would be 81%, much higher than the JMP estimate of 48%.

In 2017–18, 94% of Pakistanis had toilet facilities (99% in urban areas, 91% in rural areas), while 6% of the population did not (1% in urban areas, 9% in rural areas).

The Millennium Development Goals aimed at halving the share of people without sustainable access to an improved water source and improved sanitation by 2015 compared to 1990. In 2006 the United Nations Development Programme estimated that concerning urban and rural water supply as well as urban sanitation, the targets will be achieved prematurely, whereas rural sanitation progress was classified to be "on track". According to the 2010 figures of the JMP above, however, the water target had been reached at that time already, while the sanitation target did not look as if it was going to be reached.

According to the National Drinking Water Policy (NDWP) of 2009, Pakistan aims at providing universal access to drinking water in an equitable, efficient and sustainable manner by 2040. The National Sanitation Policy of 2006 aims to meet the Millennium Development Goal (MDG) concerning sanitation by 2015 and to also reach universal access by 2040.

== Impact of inadequate sanitation ==
The economic impact of inadequate sanitation has been estimated at 344 billion Rupees (US$5.7 billion), equivalent to almost 4 percent of GDP. 87% of the impact is on health, 5% on increased costs of water supply and 8% are other impacts. The main health impacts are premature mortality and productivity losses, followed by treatment costs. Water supply costs include higher costs for the supply of piped water, higher expenses for bottled water and the cost of household water treatment. Other costs include the cost of increased time for open defecation and the use of shared toilets, and a relatively small cost of lost tourism revenues. Many intangible costs were not included in the estimate, such as the lack of privacy, security, status and dignity. The cost of environmental conditions stemming from poor sanitation was also not included in the estimate.

== Service quality ==
Water supply service quality is often insufficient in Pakistan. One document criticizes the MDG's methodology for only taking into account coverage figures, without giving attention to adequate service quality. Continuity of supply and water quality are two important elements of drinking water service quality. The treatment of collected wastewater is one element of sanitation service quality.

=== Continuity of supply ===
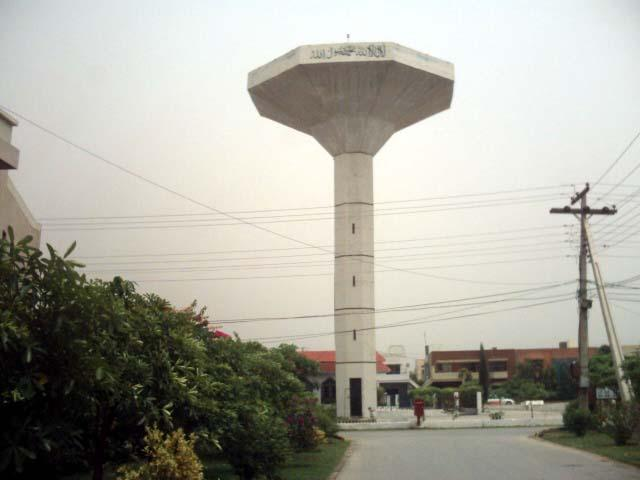
Water tower in Lahore

Intermittent water supply is common in urban areas. For Pakistani cities, the Asian Development Bank (ADB) indicates continuity rates of 1 to 10 hours (Karachi), 11 to 15 hours (Rawalpindi) and 16 to 23 hours (Lahore) per day. During a 2005 workshop, similar figures were reported except for Rawalpindi for which a shorter duration of only 8 hours was reported. Consequently, consumers use on-site storage mechanisms like ground or roof tanks, or they purchase water from lorry tankers or use shallow wells and rivers. Many privately operated lorry tankers are licensed by water utilities and benefit from the discontinuous water supply.

Hours of water supply per day in major Pakistani cities
Karachi	Lahore	Faisalabad	Rawalpindi	Multan	Peshawar
4	17	8	8	8	9

=== Drinking water quality ===
According to a survey on behalf of the Pakistan Council of Research in Water Resources published in 2012, 88% of the functional water supply schemes in Pakistan provide water that is unsafe for drinking because of microbiological contamination.

Increased arsenic, nitrate and fluoride contamination was detected in drinking water in various localities in Pakistan, according to an official government document. Generally, water pressure is low in Pakistani supply systems. Together with leaky pipes, this leads to infiltration of contaminated water. A survey of drinking water samples in Karachi in 2007/08 found that, of 216 ground and surface water samples collected, 86% had lead levels higher than the WHO maximum acceptable concentration of 10 parts per billion (ppb). The mean lead concentration was 146 ppb in untreated ground water and 77 ppb in treated tap water. In 2012, according to Rafiq Khanani, professor and pathology chairman at the Dow University of Health Sciences, water-borne Naegleria fowleri have killed at least 10 people in Karachi in three months. The infection does not occur by drinking water infested with the amoeba, but if water enters the nose. The amoeba then attack the brain and cause primary amoebic meningoencephalitis. Newspapers reported that drinking water was provided without any treatment or disinfection, which facilitated the spread of the amoeba. As a reaction to the findings, a citizen of Karachi submitted a court petition asking the Karachi Water and Sewerage Board to fulfill its duty to provide clean water. In October 2012, the Sindh High Court issued a notice to the Board asking it to comment on the petition.

In Rawalpindi water quality improved after a new managing director of the local utility made it a priority in 2007 as part of a broader performance improvement strategy. Within a year the share of samples that showed that water was unfit for drinking declined from 64 to 26 percent.

=== Wastewater treatment ===
The Pakistani Ministry of Water and Power reported in 2002 that only 1% of the domestic and industrial wastewater receives treatment. According to the Pakistan Water Situational Analysis, there are three wastewater treatment plants in Islamabad, of which only one is functional. Karachi has two trickling filters, where effluents generally receive screening and sedimentation. Lahore has some screening and grit removal systems, but they are hardly functional. In Faisalabad, there is a wastewater treatment plant, in which wastewater receives primary treatment, but it treats only 7 percent of the collected wastewater in the city. Multan, Rawalpindi and Gujranwala have no wastewater treatment plants at all. In rural areas, wastewater treatment is nonexistent, leading to pollution of surface and groundwater.

== History and recent developments ==
For the first decades of Pakistan's modern history, in the largest cities City Development Authorities and their Water and Sanitation Authorities (WASAs) were responsible for water supply and sanitation. In towns and villages water supply facilities were built and operated by the provincial governments through their Public Health Engineering Departments (PHEDs). This was initially done without much participation by local government and communities in decision-making. However, in 1992 the federal government launched a Social Action Plan, which emphasized user participation, hygiene promotion and the use low-cost technologies in water supply and sanitation. A shift of sector responsibility then took place under the 2001 Local Government Ordinance (LGO). Under the LGO, three tiers of local governments were created:

- 120 District
- about 500 tehsils
- about 5,000 local governments governed by Union Councils of Pakistan

The responsibility for water supply and sanitation was nominally devolved to Tehsil Municipal Administrations (TMAs), the second-lowest tier of local government in Pakistan. The PHED was supposed to be merged into the Provincial Local Government Department and its staff was supposed to be devolved at the TMA level. However, the decentralization has not been implemented in all provinces. In 2008, it was reported that PHEDs were still active in water supply development, operation and maintenance, particularly in areas where the schemes spread across more than one tehsil. In those cases, the PHEDs usually develop supply-driven schemes with little or no participation of TMAs. In addition, the devolution took place differently from one province top another. According to a 2003 document, the PHED remains fully functional in the Balochistan Province and in the Punjab Province, and local government powers were recentralized.

=== National Sanitation Policy of 2006 ===
The National Sanitation Policy (NSP), approved by the federal government in 2006, promotes the grassroots concept of community-led total sanitation (CLTS) in communities with less than 1,000 inhabitants. In larger communities, the NSP promotes a "component sharing model", under which sewage and wastewater treatment facilities are provided by the communities in case that local government-developed disposal is not available. The objective is the safe disposal of excreta through the use of latrines, the creation of an "open defecation free environment", safe disposal of liquid and solid waste and the promotion of health and hygiene practices. The federal government provides incentives for the implementation of the NSP in the form of rewards for open defecation-free tehsils/towns, 100% sanitation coverage tehsils/towns, the cleanest tehsils/towns and the cleanest industrial estates or clusters.

=== National Drinking Water Policy of 2009 ===
In September 2009 the government approved the National Drinking Water Policy that aims at providing safe drinking water to the entire Pakistani population by 2040, including the poor and vulnerable, at an affordable cost. A main objective is a clearer separation between the functions of service provision and regulation. The right to water for drinking precedes all other uses, like industrial or agricultural water use. Women are recognized as main actors of domestic water supply, and their active participation in the sector is sought. In accordance with the LGO, the document highlights the responsibility of local governments to provide drinking water. The policy is expected to be reviewed and updated every five years to examine its implementation and

efficacy and to adapt it to the changing situation in the country.

=== Clean Drinking Water for All Programme ===
The Clean Drinking Water for All Programme/Clean Drinking Water Initiative aim to improve the quality of drinking water by building water treatment facilities.

The US$8.2 million Clean Drinking Water Initiative, approved in 2004, provides for the construction of 445 water purification plants of 7.5 cubic metres per hour in all Pakistani tehsils. The Ministry of Environment is to "provide the technical support to the provinces by installing various plants at selected places on turn key basis and then handing it over to local municipal administration." The plants would be installed in "public places", which together with the limited capacity of the plants suggests that the purified water is not to be used for network supply, but rather for distribution as bottled water. The much larger US$168 million Clean Drinking Water for All Programme aims at delivering one purification plant to each Pakistani Union Council. The plants are expected to be maintained through contracting out for three subsequent years. It is estimated that one purification plant will serve 2-20% of each Union Council's population, which on average have 20,000 inhabitants. Under the programme, the establishment of 6,035 purification plants with capacities of 1.8, 3.7 and 7.5 cubic metres per hour is planned.

In January 2009 USAID signed a Memorandum of Understanding with the "Ministry of Special Initiatives" to support the programme with US$17.9 million, anticipating that over 31 million Pakistanis in 40 districts will benefit from it.

The German companies Siemens and KSB won contracts under the programme to install purification plants in Punjab.

The Programme generated criticism when it was learned that inadequate planning may threaten to halt the entire programme. Furthermore, there have been allegations of conflict of interest by certain persons who, although occupying highest government offices, had formed private companies to win the installation contract from the Government. Taking cognizance of this, the Government of the Punjab has expressed its serious reservations against the project and has even suggested that it be halted until proper planning and siting of plants can take place.

== Responsibility for water supply and sanitation ==
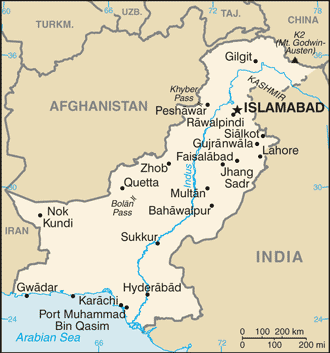
Map of Pakistan

=== Policy and regulation ===
Drinking water and sanitation policy is the constitutional responsibility of provincial governments. Municipal utilities are accountable to both the provincial and local governments, but there is little regulation of their performance. This has changed to some extent in Punjab in 2006 when the provincial government, through its Housing, Urban Development and Public Health Engineering Department drew up a roadmap for reforming its water utilities. The roadmap aimed at making the five largest utilities, called the WASAs, more professional and accountable through the appointment of new managing directors from the private sector and through the signing of performance contracts between the provincial government and the utilities.

The federal government is only involved in policy development and the setting of guidelines, mostly through the Ministry of Climate Change (formerly called Ministry of Environment). A National Drinking Water and Sanitation Committee was established in 2009 to implement both the National Sanitation Policy and the National Drinking Water Policy. The Ministry of Health is expected to set water quality standards and monitor drinking water quality in the country. Poor coordination between the ministry and other authorities have been reported. The Health Services Academy under the Ministry of Health published Quality Drinking Water Standards for Pakistan in May 2007. These standards were not officially implemented and monitored in 2008.

=== Service provision ===
Service provision is, in principle, a responsibility of local government, although in practice provincial governments still play an important role in service provision, especially in rural areas.

In seven of the largest cities, which are among the ten City District Governments in Pakistan, there are semi-autonomous utilities called Water and Sanitation Agencies (WASAs). Some WASAs were created in response to loan conditions imposed by foreign donors during the 1990s, such as the Belochistan WASA in Quetta in 1989 and the WASA in Rawalpindi in 1998, the latter in fulfillment of a condition of a loan by the Asian Development Bank. WASAs also exist in Faisalabad, Lahore, Hyderabad, Islamabad and Multan. The WASA in Faisalabad had already been created in 1978. The WASA's are "wings" of the respective City Development Authorities. In Karachi, the Karachi Water and Sewerage Board (KWSB) was separated from the City Development Authority and is an autonomous utility established by law in 1996.

Since the 2001 Local Government Ordinance, water supply and sanitation services in other cities and towns are expected to be transferred from provincial governments to the roughly 500 newly created Tehsil Municipal Administrations (TMAs). Responsibilities for coordination and joint implementation across TMAs were devolved to the 120 District Governments. However, as indicated above, challenges in the transition period were reported and provincial Public Health and Engineering Departments (PHEDs) in the four Pakistani Provinces continue to provide water services, especially in rural areas. In urban areas outside the largest cities, local governments have formed public sector water boards.

NGOs are particularly active in sanitation, and have reached some notable achievements. Under the National Drinking Water and Sanitation Policies, the participation of NGOs and the private sector is encouraged.

== Innovative approaches ==
A number of innovative sanitation approaches have been piloted in Pakistan. These include participatory sanitation infrastructure projects - such as the Orangi Pilot Project in urban slums in the 1980s and the Lodhran Pilot Project in rural areas since 1999 - as well as Community-led total sanitation (CLTS) projects implemented since 2003.

=== Orangi Pilot Project ===
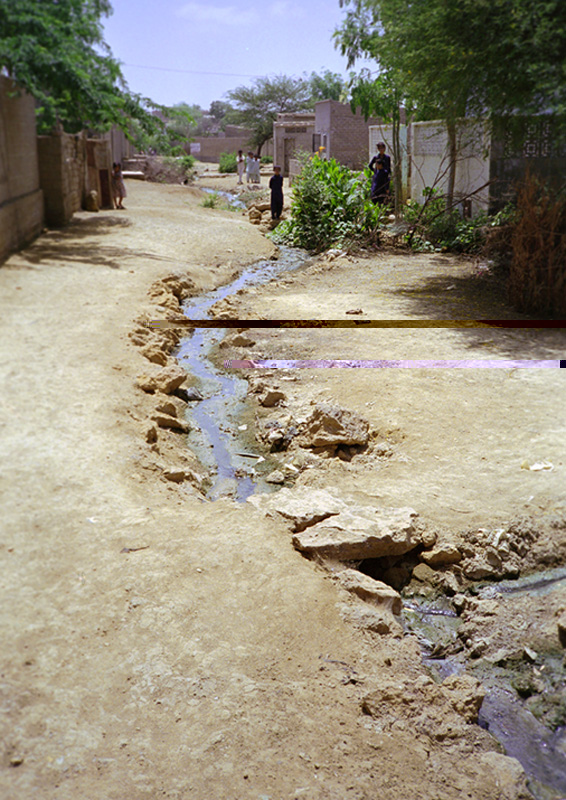
Slum in Karachi

Orangi is a large informal low-income settlement located in Karachi and place of a user participation success story. The Orangi Pilot Project (OPP) was initiated by an NGO under Dr. Akhtar Hameed Khan in 1980 in order to improve the poor sanitation conditions through a low-cost sanitation program with active user participation. A main feature of the project is the component sharing model. The first component is responsibility of the communities, which receive technical assistance. The community develops and constructs primary household sanitary latrines, underground sewers and neighborhood collector sewers. Those are connected to main sewers and treatment plants, which form the second component and are constructed with public funds. The OPP was very successful and about 100,000 households have developed their own sanitation systems in Orangi. The project was replicated by NGOs and CBOs in other Pakistani cities. The component sharing model is encouraged under the 2006 National Sanitation Policy.

=== Lodhran Pilot Project ===
Inspired by the OPP, a pilot project emerged in Lodhran District in 1999. The project follows a low cost, community owned rural sanitation model based on a participatory approach. In 2004, the Lodhran Pilot Project (LPP) received a US$1.1 million grant by the World Bank-administered Japan Social Development Fund (JSDF) to expand the model in 100 villages in Southern Punjab. Under the grant, TMAs receive technical assistance concerning public private partnerships, training and capacity building and communication.

=== Community-led total sanitation (CLTS) ===
In Pakistan, the concept of Community-led total sanitation (CLTS) was first introduced as a pilot project in Mardan District in the North West Frontier Province in 2003 by UNICEF together with a local NGO IRSP (Integrated Regional Support Program). A main objective of the concept is to create open defecation free villages through behavioral change in the whole community, rather than to construct sanitation facilities for individual households. Since then, CLTS has spread rapidly in the whole country and became a main feature of the National Sanitation Policy, which provides financial rewards for defined outcomes. Development agencies began to link their funding and incentives to theopen defecation free status. For example, the Khushal Pakistan Fund has allocated about US$200 million (12 billion Pakistani rupees) to community infrastructure projects in open defecation free communities.

In addition, several organizations like Plan Pakistan and WaterAid have integrated CLTS in their strategies and projects. CLTS projects were active in all four Pakistani regions in 2007. NGOs were implementing CLTS in about 20 districts in 2008. At the same time, more than 130 defecation free villages already existed in Pakistan.

Through CLTS more than 1,500 villages achieved "open defecation free status" by 2009. This figure is expected to reach 15,000 villages by June 2011, covering a third of the rural population of Pakistan. An assessment of CLTS pilots in nine villages showed that open defecation stopped, but communities used unimproved and unhygienic latrines making any substantial effort to upgrade or replace damaged latrines.

== Efficiency of utilities ==
There is little reliable quantitative information available concerning the performance of Pakistani water and sewer utilities, including on their efficiency. The Asian Development Bank (ADB) prepared a document, which includes data for the cities of Rawalpindi, Karachi and Lahore. Furthermore, data from six major cities were reported during a 2005 workshop in Karachi. Beginning in 2005, the first systematic performance benchmarking for water and sewer utilities in Pakistan was initiated by the World Bank's Water and sanitation program as part of a regional project. Eight utilities participated, including five WASAs in Punjab as well as the utilities of Karachi, Peshawar and Islamabad. The benchmarking project found that data were not very reliable and that benchmarking was "largely externally driven than internally motivated" and that the organizational culture of utilities was "often slow to accept performance measurement, accountability to customers and to government, and improved service outcomes."

Two common indicators of the efficiency of utilities are non-revenue water and labor productivity.

=== Non-revenue water ===
The share of non-revenue water (NRW), water which is produced but not billed due to several reasons like leakage and illegal connections, varies between an estimated 25% in Multan and an estimated 75% in Gujranwala. It is difficult to accurately measure NRW, because customer metering is uncommon. For example, in Punjab only 3 percent of connections of the five largest utilities have functioning meters and are being read. Officials from major Pakistani cities reported a share of NRW during a 2005 workshop, ranging from 40% to 50%.

There is no agreement on appropriate levels of NRW among professionals. However, Tynan and Kingdom propose a best practice target of 23% in developing countries.

=== Labor productivity ===
There are no updated and precise figures for labor productivity, measured in employees per 1,000 connections. However, the Ministry of Water and Power indicated a poor performance in the country's major cities. The ADB found an average of 5.6 employees per 1,000 connections in Karachi. In Lahore and Rawalpindi, labor productivity is indicated lower at 9.5 and 12.7 employees per 1,000 connections, respectively. At the 2005 workshop, between 6 and 27 employees per 1,000 connections in major cities were reported. Tynan and Kingdom propose a best practice target of 5 employees per 1,000 connections in developing countries. However it should be mentioned that equally to NRW, this target is a suggestion of the authors, which is not established as official best practice target among professionals.

Indicators of efficiency in major Pakistani cities
	Karachi	Lahore	Faisalabad	Rawalpindi	Multan	Peshawar
NRW	45%	40%	40%	45%	40%	50%
Staff per 1,000 connections	6	12	10	11	27	14

A 2010 report by the Water and sanitation program notes that "civil service staffing policies constrain utility managers from hiring the staff they require; they cannot incentivize them appropriately; and on-the-job training seems to be limited by most accounts."

== Financial aspects ==
=== Tariffs and cost recovery ===
Because of low tariffs, poor collection efficiency and overstaffing, many urban utilities do not cover the costs for operation and maintenance. According to an international survey conducted in 2012, the water tariff in Karachi was among the 20 lowest water tariffs in the world in a sample of 310 cities. According to this survey, the residential water tariff in Karachi was US$0.09 per m^{3} for a consumption of 15 m^{3} per month. The tariff had been raised by 67% in September 2011, in order to pay for an increase of the electricity rates charged to the water utility. This made it the third-highest increase in water tariffs in the world in 2011. According to the Karachi Water and Sewer Board, the unmetered water tariff after the increase was 111 Pakistani Rupees (about US$1.17) for a residences of 83 square metres, corresponding to US$0.08 per m^{3}. For larger residences the flat tariff is much higher. The metered tariff, however, was 71 Rupees per 3.7 m^{3}, corresponding to about US$0.16 per m^{3}.

In many cities and towns, especially smaller ones, municipalities subsidize water supply because tariff revenues are insufficient to recover costs. The National Drinking Water Policy of 2009 does not mention cost recovery, while a draft of the policy called for increased cost recovery.

In Rawalpindi a new managing director appointed in 2006 regularized unauthorized connections, collected arrears and thus increased cost recovery from 53 to 86 percent. The utility is now able to pay all salaries and electricity bills from its own revenues.

=== Investment and financing ===
The sector strongly depends on internal and external financing. The Ministry of Power and Water reported in 2002 that in recent years, 49% of the total new investments in the water sector had been financed by external loans and 43% by the government. The MTDF recognizes that with 0.25% of its total GDP, Pakistan's investment in the water supply and sanitation sector is inadequate and provides for US$2 billion (120 billion rupee) or US$404 million per year for the sector from 2005 to 2010, half of which is to be paid by the federal and provincial governments, including the construction and rehabilitation of water supply schemes in urban and rural areas and wastewater treatment plants in provincial capitals. The other half is expected to be provided by the private sector and includes water supply systems, sewerage networks and wastewater treatment as part of new housing schemes in cities and towns.

== External cooperation ==
The government receives substantial external support to improve drinking water supply and sanitation through loans from the Asian Development Bank (ADB) and the World Bank, as well as grants from Japan and the United States. In addition, NGOs directly provide assistance.

=== Asian Development Bank ===
Punjab Cities Improvement Investment Program (since 2009). In July 2009 the Asian Development Bank (ADB) approved a loan for an unknown amount to support a "Punjab Cities Improvement Investment Program" that aims at "improved municipal environment and public health for an estimated 6 million residents across some 11 larger intermediate cities of Punjab Province".

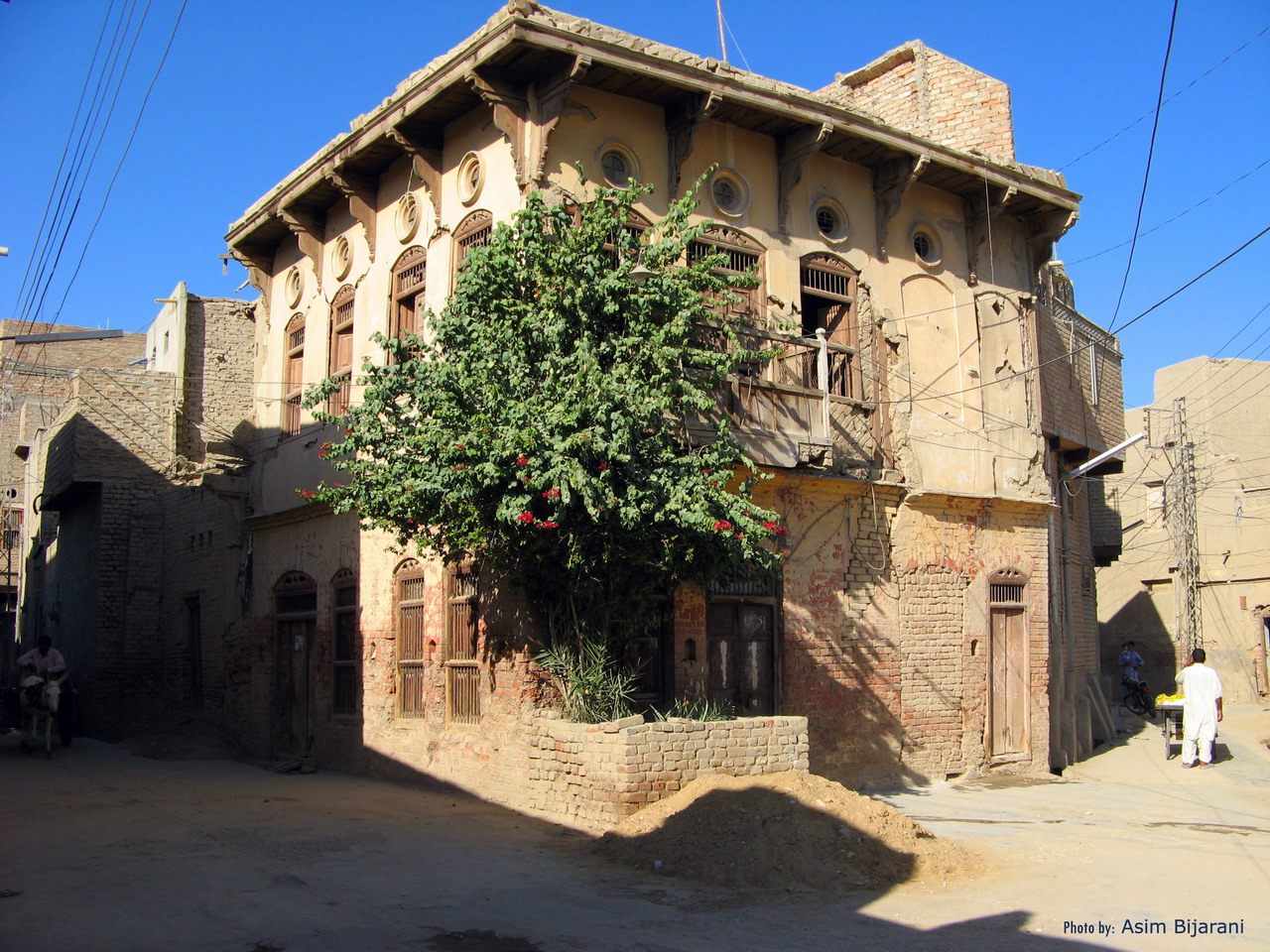
House in Shikarpur town, one of the cities where urban infrastructure was improved with financing from the Asian Development Bank

Sindh Cities Improvement Investment Program (since 2008). In December 2008 the ADB approved a $300 million loan for the Sindh Cities Improvement Investment Program, which aims at improving water supply, wastewater, and solid waste management infrastructure in more than 20 secondary cities in the Province of Sindh with more than six million inhabitants. The loan, in the form of a multitranche financing facility (MFF), will also support urban sector reforms - such as the establishment of local government-owned urban services corporations - and capacity development. The first tranche of $38 million (2009–2012) targets the northern Sindh cities of Sukkur, New Sukkur, Rohri, Khairpur, Shikarpur and Larkana.

Punjab Community Water Supply and Sanitation Sector Project (2003–2007). The ADB also financed the Punjab Community Water Supply and Sanitation Sector Project with US$50 million, which was active in rural areas in all districts of the Punjab province from 2003 until the end of 2007. As a result, about 2.5 million additional people in 778 villages were provided with water supply and sanitation facilities, according to the ADB "with full cost recovery". Community-based organizations maintain and operate the schemes and charge the users. Tehsil municipal administrations were strengthened and received training. In addition, communities received training in health and hygiene practices and the construction of latrines. The project also established a link between the beneficiary communities and micro finance institutions, which have disbursed about US$4 million to about 15,000 borrowers in 617 communities.

=== Japan ===
Abbottabad water supply (since 2010). In September 2010 JICA approved a 3.644 billion Yen grant to improve water supply in Abbottabad in the Pashtun area through the development of surface water supply for the city that so far depended only on groundwater. The project has no sanitation component. In 2008 and 2010 it had approved two grants in the amount of 5.19 billion Yen for water supply in Faisalabad in Punjab. Just as the project in Abbottabad, it aims at developing bulk water supply, in this case from a well field located near a Canal, the Jhang Branch Canal. A parallel project provides training and advice on institutional reforms. The project builds on a previous project to improve the water distribution network in the city.

Lahore Sanitation (since 2006). Since 2006 JICA has provided grants in the amount of 2.44 billion Yen to improve sanitation and drainage in Lahore under two projects.

Karachi (1994-?). In 1994 the Japanese Bank for International Cooperation (JBIC), one of the predecessor agencies of today's JICA, approved a 10.3 billion Yen loan for a Karachi Water Supply Improvement Project. JICA also supported a Master Plan for water Supply and sewerage in Karachi, completed as a final draft in 2008.

Islamabad and Rawalpindi Water Supply (1989–2000). In 1989 JBIC had approved two loans to support two Metropolitan Water Supply Projects to transfer bulk water from the Khanpur Dam and the Simly Dam for a total of 18.268 billion Yen. The Khanpur project, implemented between 1994 and 2000, aimed at increasing bulk water supply to Islamabad and Rawalpindi from the Khanpur Dam. An ex-post evaluation of the project in 2002 judged that "the effect of the project was not necessarily high". The amount of water supplied was only 41% of what had been planned, and there were "various problems with the executing agency (the Capital Development Authority) such as the scarcity of personnel, underdeveloped institutions, and the shortage of active efforts." A Japanese field survey in 2008 re-examined the situation and found that "no noticeable improvements have been made". The total amount spent was US$109 million (12,442 million Yen). Among other things, water purification facilities with a capacity of 281,000 m^{3} per day, water supply facilities and water storage facilities had been constructed.

=== United States ===
In January 2009 USAID signed a Memorandum of Understanding with the "Ministry of Special Initiatives" to support the Clean Drinking Water for All Programme (see above) with US$17.9 million, anticipating that over 31 million Pakistanis in 40 districts will benefit from it.

=== World Bank ===
Punjab Municipal Services Improvement Project (2006–2012). The World Bank contributed a loan of US$50 million to improve municipal services in Punjab. The project is implemented by the provincial government of Punjab, with about half the funds going to water supply and sanitation.

Punjab Cities Governance Improvement (2012 onwards). In 2012 the World Bank approved another US$150 million loan for cities in Punjab, again with a significant share devoted to water supply and sanitation.

Second Karachi Water Supply (1993–2001). Under the second Karachi Water Supply Project, the World Bank contributed with US$92 million to increase water supply coverage and sanitation in Karachi and to improve operation, management and financial viability of the Karachi Water and Sewerage Board (KWSB). The project started in 1993 and provided for the construction of a canal to bring water from the Indus River, pumping stations, water and wastewater treatment facilities. In low income areas, small bore sewers were to be built. The operational efficiency of KWSB was expected to improve through technical assistance by the World Bank and increased cost reduction measures, e.g. reduction of water losses.

Rural Water Supply & Sanitation Project (1991–2000). The World Bank contributed with US$137 million to the Rural Water Supply & Sanitation Project, which was active from 1991 to 2000 in the self-governing Pakistani state of Azad Jammu and Kashmir. The main objectives of the project were to improve rural productivity and health and reduce poverty and deprivation. The components of the project included the construction and rehabilitation of water supply and sanitation schemes, institutional strengthening and training, latrine construction materials accompanied by health education and promotion, water resources and sanitation studies and private sector support.

=== Non-governmental organizations ===
Foreign NGOs also provide support for the extension of drinking water supply and sanitation in Pakistan. For example, WaterAid from the UK has set up a rainwater collection project in the Thar Desert and influenced government in the city of Gujranwala in Punjab leading to the provision of clean water for 2,500 slum residents. It also helped to include hygiene education in schools.

== See also ==
- List of districts of Pakistan by access to safe drinking water
- Karachi Water and Sewerage Board
- Water resources management in Pakistan
- Dams, water locks and canals of Pakistan
