= Qazi Khuda Bakhsh =

First elected Muslim Mayor of Karachi, Pakistan

Kazi Khuda Bakhsh
- قاضي خدابخش

1st Elected Muslim Mayor of Karachi
- In office 3 May 1935 – 9 May 1936
- Preceded by: Teakum Dass Vadhumull
- Succeeded by: Ardeshir H. Mama

Deputy Mayor, Karachi Municipal Corporation
- In office 1934–1935

Public Prosecutor, Sindh
- In office 1943–1944

Personal details
- Born: 1 August 1894 Moro, Sindh, British India
- Died: 20 February 1944 (aged 49)
- Education: Sindh Madressatul Islam High School, Karachi; Aligarh Muslim College

Kazi Khuda Bakhsh Morai ([Sindhi: قاضي خدابخش مورائي], 1 August 1894 – 20 February 1944) was a Pakistani freedom fighter, journalist, social reformist and lawyer. He was an active member of the Khilafat movement and served as the first Muslim mayor of Karachi from 1935 to 1936. He also served as editor of the Sindhi language daily Al-Waheed.

== Early life and education ==
Qazi Khuda Bakhsh was born on 1 August 1894 in Moro, Naushehro Feroz District, Sindh, Bombay Presidency, British India (now Pakistan). He was first taught by his father Maulvi Qazi Nabi Bakhsh Morai, then at the local primary school in Moro. He passed the matriculation exam from Sindh Maderatul Islam High School (now University) in Karachi in 1914. He also studied for one year at D.J. Sindh College. He earned a Bachelor of Arts degree from Aligarh Muslim College in 1921, where he won two medals in debate competitions.

After the collapse of the Khilafat movement, he resumed his studies and earned a law degree from Meerut Law College in 1926.

== Political career ==
Bakhsh was elected vice president of Aligarh Student Union in 1919. He served as member of the working committee of All India Congress and as personal assistant to Maulana Muhammad Ali Johar. He addressed many gatherings of the Khilafat movement in various cities of British India while accompanying Johar. He also worked as secretary of the provincial Khilafat committee of Sindh and as the editor of Al-Waheed. Due to his active participation in the Khilafat movement he was jailed in Karachi and Pune in 1922. During his imprisonment, he studied tafseer of the Quran by Maulana Muhammad Akram Balai.

After graduating from Meerut Law College in 1926, he started his own law practice in Karachi. He was elected unopposed as deputy mayor of Karachi in 1934; the next year, on 3 May 1935, he became the first Muslim mayor of Karachi. One of his acts as mayor was to upgrade his alma mater, Sindh Madersatul Islam High School, to a university. He was mayor for just over a year, until 9 May 1936.

He was appointed public prosecutor of Sindh province in 1943 and remained in that post until his death.

== Death ==
Bakhsh died on 20 February 1944 at the age of 49. His final resting place is Mewa Shah Graveyard in Karachi.
