= Sohrab Katrak Parsi Colony =

Neighbourhood in Jamshed Town, Karachi, Sindh, Pakistan

Coordinates: 24°51′N 67°03′E

Sohrab Katrak Parsi Colony is one of the neighbourhoods of Jamshed Town in Karachi, Sindh, Pakistan.

== History ==
In 1920, the Zoroastrians (Parsis) of Karachi purchased 96,000 square yards of land to create a dedicated neighborhood, reflecting their social and cultural values. The neighborhood, named after Sir Kawasji Hormasji Katrak, was carefully planned with 58 plots, each around 1,000 square yards, wide roads, and a central area for community amenities such as a garden and a library.

Despite a decline in the Parsi population over time, the Banu Mandal community center and Bhedwar Library remain central to the colony, especially during religious festivities. These buildings continue to serve as hubs for the remaining Parsi residents.

After the independence of Pakistan in 1947, the demographic composition of the colony changed with the migration of Muslims to the country. Over the years, the majority of residents shifted to Muslim ethnic groups, including Muhajirs, Punjabis, Sindhis, Kashmiris, Seraikis, Pakhtuns, Balochis, and smaller communities of Memons, Bohras, Ismailis, and Christians.

The Parsi Colony is known for its well-planned infrastructure, including low boundary walls, manicured gardens, old trees, and community areas, reflecting the Parsis' vision of modern urban living with open spaces and community bonding. The neighborhood's distinct charm offers a different urban environment in Karachi, one where walking is unrestricted and the streets are more relaxed than in other parts of the city. Despite the demographic changes, the colony maintains its sense of community and thoughtful layout.

There are several ethnic groups including Muhajirs, Punjabis, Sindhis, Kashmiris, Seraikis, Pakhtuns, Balochis, Memons, Bohras Ismailis and Christians.
