= Murtaza Wahab =

Pakistani politician

Barrister Murtaza Wahab
- مرتضیٰ وہاب

Mayor of Karachi
- Incumbent
- Assumed office 19 June 2023
- Deputy: Salman Murad
- Preceded by: Waseem Akhtar
- In office 5 August 2021 – 8 December 2022

Member of the Senate of Pakistan
- In office August 2017 – 11 March 2018

Personal details
- Born: 25 December 1983 (age 42) Karachi, Sindh, Pakistan
- Party: PPP (2015-present)
- Relations: Fauzia Wahab (mother)

Barrister Murtaza Wahab Siddiqui is a Pakistani politician who is the current mayor of Karachi. He was a member of the Senate of Pakistan from August 2017 to March 2018.

== Early life and education ==
The son of the late senior PPP politician Fauzia Wahab (1956-2012), Murtaza has earned his Bachelors of Commerce degree from the University of Karachi before pursuing an LLB from the University of London and Bar at Law from Lincoln's Inn, after which he became an advocate of the Sindh High Court. He is from an Urdu-speaking Muhajir background. Murtaza was born on December 25, 1983

== Political career ==
On 30 April 2015, he was inducted into the provincial Sindh cabinet of Chief Minister Syed Murad Ali Shah and was appointed as adviser to the chief minister on law. On 21 May 2015, he was given the status of minister.

A petition was filed in the High Court of Sindh challenging the appointment of Wahab as adviser to the chief minister and the granting of minister's status to Wahab. The petitioner argued that Wahab became an advocate of the High Court of Sindh in June 2010, and therefore have experience of only six years. The petitioner also challenged the appointment of Wahab as chairman of the board of governors of law colleges in Karachi, saying that only provincial minister of Education or the vice-chancellor of the University of Karachi can be appointed for the post.

On 22 November 2016, The High Court of Sindh declared his appointment as advisor to the chief minister of Sindh as illegal. The court also nullified his chairmanship of the board of governors of law colleges in Karachi.

He was elected unopposed to the Senate of Pakistan as a candidate of Pakistan Peoples Party (PPP) on 15 August 2017. The seat had fallen vacant after the resignation of Saeed Ghani. His Senate membership was due to expire on 11 March 2018.

He ran for the seat in Sindh Provincial Assembly as a candidate of PPP from Constituency PS-111 (Karachi South-V) in the 2018 Pakistani general election but was unsuccessful. He received 8,502 votes and lost the seat to Imran Ismail.

On 19 August 2018, he was inducted into the provincial Sindh cabinet of Chief Minister Syed Murad Ali Shah. On 21 August, he was appointed as adviser to chief minister on law, and Anti-Corruption Establishment. On 5 September 2018, he was given the additional portfolio of information.

On 5 August 2021, he was appointed as Administrator of Karachi.

=== Mayor of Karachi Election 2023 ===
In the 2023 election, Murtaza Wahab and Hafiz Naeem Ur Rehman competed for the position of mayor in Karachi. Murtaza Wahab, the candidate from the Pakistan People's Party (PPP), emerged as the apparent winner with 173 votes, while Hafiz Naeem ur Rehman from Jamaat-e-Islami (JI) received 160 votes, according to unofficial results. After the unofficial mayoral results were announced, there were clashes between JI and PPP workers outside the Arts Council of Pakistan.
