= Abdul Shakoor Shad =

Pakistani politician

Member of the National Assembly of Pakistan
- In office 13 August 2018 – 29 July 2022
- President: Arif Alvi
- Prime Minister: Imran Khan
- Constituency: NA-246 (Karachi South-I)
- Majority: 10,405 (5.12%)

Personal details
- Born: Karachi, Sindh, Pakistan
- Other political affiliations: PTI (2018-2023)
- Education: University of Karachi

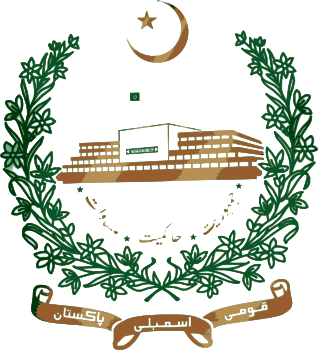
Emblem of the National Assembly of Pakistan

Abdul Shakoor Shad (عبد الشکور شاد) is a Pakistani politician who had been a member of the National Assembly of Pakistan from August 2018 until July 2022.

== Early life and education ==
He was born in Karachi.

He received a Master's degree in International Relations from the University of Karachi.

== Political career ==
He began his political career during Muhammad Zia-ul-Haq's martial law in 1977 while he was studying at the University of Karachi. His house was raided by the law enforcement agencies and his father was arrested after Shad held a rally in favor of Pakistan Peoples Party (PPP) leadership in October 1978. In an interview, Shad said that he began his political career with the PPP in 1977. In 1989, Benazir Bhutto appointed him an inspector in the Federal Investigation Agency where he worked until 2002.

In 1981, he was appointed as the general secretary of the Peoples Students Federation in the University of Karachi. The same year, he was given the additional charge as the general secretary of the PPP Karachi.

He ran for the seat of the National Assembly of Pakistan as an independent candidate in the 2008 Pakistani general election but was unsuccessful.

He joined Pakistan Tehreek-e-Insaf (PTI) in May 2018.

He was elected to the National Assembly as a candidate of PTI from Constituency NA-246 (Karachi South-I) in the 2018 Pakistani general election.

=== Resignation ===
On April 10, 2022, because of the regime change of Imran Khan's government, he resigned from the National Assembly on the orders of Imran Khan. The new government did not accept the resignations of many members for fear of deteriorating the number of members. However, accepting the resignations of eleven members on July 28, 2022, one of them was Abdul Shakoor Shad. Later, by-elections were held again on his seat, Imran Khan made a surprising move to stand on his own in all the by-seats.

== More Reading ==
- List of members of the 15th National Assembly of Pakistan
