= Shah Jahan Baloch =

Pakistani politician

Member of the National Assembly of Pakistan
- In office 1 June 2013 – 31 May 2018
- Constituency: NA-248 (Karachi-X)

Personal details
- Born: 3 June 1972 (age 53)
- Party: Pakistan Peoples Party

Shah Jahan Baloch (Urdu: شاہ جہاں بلوچ; born 3 June 1972) is a Pakistani politician who had been a member of the National Assembly of Pakistan from June 2013 to May 2018.

== Early life ==
He was born on 3 June 1972.

== Political career ==
He was elected to the National Assembly of Pakistan as a candidate of Pakistan Peoples Party (PPP) from Constituency NA-248 (Karachi-X) in the 2013 Pakistani general election. He received 84,530 votes and defeated Subhan Ali Sahil, a candidate of Pakistan Tehreek-e-Insaf (PTI).
