= Water resources management in Pakistan =

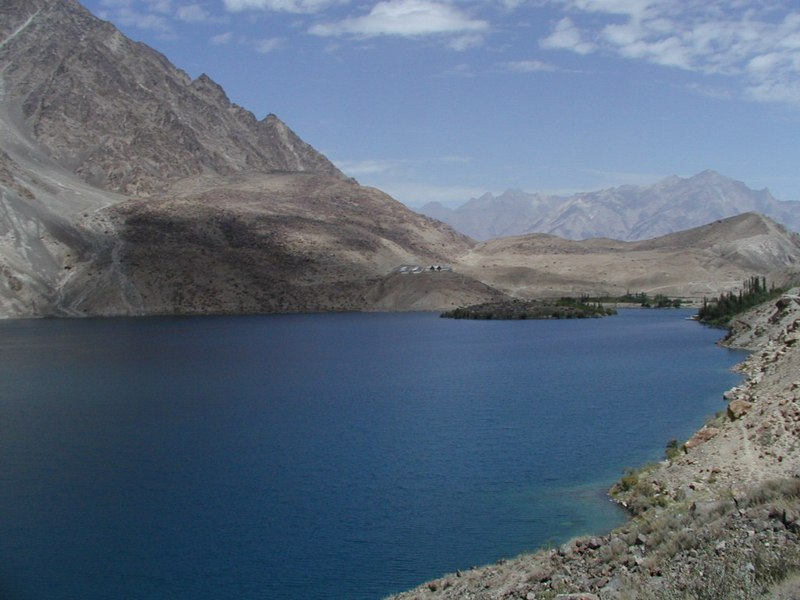
The Satpara Lake, a source of water supply for the town of Skardu.

According to the United Nations' "UN World Water Development Report", the total actual renewable water resources increased from 2,961 m³ per capita in 2000. A more recent study indicates an available supply of water of little more than 1,000 m³ per person, which puts Pakistan in the category of a high stress country. Using data from the Pakistani federal government's Planning and Development Division, the overall water availability has decreased from 1,299 m³ per capita in 1996-97 to 1,101 m³ per capita in 2004-05. In view of growing population, urbanization and increased industrialization, the situation is likely to get worse. Nevertheless, excessive mining of groundwater goes on. Despite a lowering water table, the annual growth rate of electric tubewells has been indicated to 6.7% and for diesel tubewells to about 7.4%. In addition, increasing pollution and saltwater intrusion threaten the country's water resources. About 36% of the groundwater is classified as highly saline.

In urban areas, most water is supplied from groundwater except for the cities of Karachi, and a part of Islamabad, where mainly surface water is used. In most rural areas, groundwater is used. In rural areas with saline groundwater, irrigation canals serve as the main source of domestic water.

== Water use ==
Pakistan is the fifteenth most water stressed country in the world.

Out of the 169,384 billion m³ of water which were withdrawn in 2000, 96% were used for agricultural purposes, leaving 2% for domestic and another 2% for industrial use. By far most water is used for irrigated agriculture, emphasizing the particular significance of agriculture in the country. The sector contributes about 25% of the Pakistan's GNP (2000-2001). The country still has the world's largest contiguous irrigation system. In 1999-2000, the total irrigated area in Pakistan was 181,000 km².

Water is also essential for power generation in Pakistan, since about 29% is generated through hydropower.

== See also ==
- Water supply and sanitation in Pakistan
