= Abdul Sattar Afghani =

Pakistani politician (1930–2006)

24th Mayor of Karachi
- In office 9 November 1979 – 12 February 1987
- Preceded by: Allah Bakhsh Gabol
- Succeeded by: Farooq Sattar

Member of the National Assembly of Pakistan from Sindh
- In office 2002–2006

Personal details
- Born: 6 July 1930 Karachi
- Died: 4 November 2006 (aged 76) Karachi
- Party: Jamaat-e-Islami Pakistan
- Children: 7 (4 sons and 3 daughters)
- Occupation: Politician

Abdul Sattar Afghani (Urdu: عبدالستار افغانی; 6 July 1930 – 4 November 2006) was a politician from Karachi, Pakistan. He was twice elected Mayor of Karachi and once an elected member of the National Assembly of Pakistan (MNA).

== Background ==
Afghani had Persian-speaking Tajik heritage; his ancestors migrated from Jalalabad, Afghanistan, and settled in Bombay and Karachi. Afghani's family were residents of Karachi's Lyari neighbourhood, living near the Pathan Mosque in Moosa Lane. His uncle wanted him to join the Indian National Congress youth wing, but Maulana Maudoodi convinced him to join Jamaat e Islami instead. His mother tongue was Persian, but he was also fluent in other local languages such as Sindhi, Balochi, Gujarati and Pashto. He was an alumnus of the University of Karachi.

== Political career ==
=== Mayor of Karachi ===
He was first elected mayor in 1979, serving until 1983. He was then reelected the same year and served until 1987. He was known for his outspokenness for the rights of the city. He was arrested and removed from his office when he was leading a procession of councilors from KMC Building to the Sindh Secretariat to protest against the provincial government's decision not to part with motor-vehicle tax and property tax in favour of KMC.

=== National Assembly ===
He was first elected as a member of Basic democracies system by Ayub Khan in 1960s, in 1970s he contested general elections against PPP's Abdul Sattar Gabol from Lyari but lost the election, in 1985 he contested on the same seat against PPP's Ghulam Mohammad Chishti but again lost the election. Afghani finally managed to win a seat in the National Assembly in 2002 from Karachi (NA 250, Karachi XII).

== Family ==
Afghani married at the age of 17 and had four sons and three daughters.

== Death ==
Afghani died in November 2006 at the Aga Khan University Hospital, Karachi. He was buried in the Mewa Shah Graveyard in Lyari.
