= Hormasji Vajifdar =

Indian cricketer

Personal information
- Full name: Hormasji Jehangirji Vajifdar
- Born: 2 December 1894; Bombay, India
- Died: 24 March 1961 (aged 66); Bombay, India
- Batting: Right-handed
- Bowling: Right-arm medium-fast
- Source: ESPNcricinfo, 27 February 2017

Hormasji Vajifdar (2 December 1894 – 24 March 1961) was an Indian cricketer who played first-class cricket from 1913 to 1937.

A right-handed middle-order batsman and right-arm medium-fast bowler, Vajifdar played in the final of the 1934–35 Ranji Trophy, the trophy's inaugural season, for Bombay, scoring 21 and 71 and taking 2 for 44 and 8 for 40 in Bombay's victory. In the final of the 1935–36 Ranji Trophy he captained Bombay to a second title.
