= Karachi Goan Association =

Social and sports club in Karachi, Pakistan

Karachi Goan Association is a social and sports club in Karachi, Sindh, Pakistan.

== Early history ==
In 1887 the foundation stone of the Goa-Portuguese Association building was laid, and in 1888 an imposing building was completed at a cost of Rs. 14,013. The building is a magnificent structure, and a popular Karachi landmark. The building has an extensive dance hall on the upper floor. There is a spacious stage for concerts, plays and operas. There are billiard and card rooms, table tennis rooms, a well furnished library, a well stocked bar and an outdoor tennis court.

The building was designed by Moses Somake, a Jewish architect of Iraqi origin.

In 1886 the Goa-Portuguese Association was established, with L.C. Gomes as the first President. Cincinnatus Fabian D'Abreo was instrumental in starting the Association.

In 1925 Augustus D’Cruz built the main pavilion of the Association's gymkhana on Mohammad Ali Jinnah Road. The gymkhana formally opened in 1926 on a plot of land measuring 28,000 square yards. It is used for all outdoor and indoor sporting activities. It has two tennis courts, an indoor badminton court and a field for cricket, hockey and soccer.

In 1933 the Marylebone Cricket Club team was feted by the Association during a visit to Karachi.

== Karachi Goan Association ==
In 1936 the name of the Goa-Portuguese Association was changed to the Karachi Goan Association (KGA) with C.M. Lobo as its first President.

Manuel Misquita, a former mayor of Karachi, twice served as President of the Karachi Goan Association, first from 1941 to 1942 and then again in 1954.

According to Roland deSouza, a member, in 1947 the population of Karachi was around 400,000 of which the Goan community numbered roughly 12,000 to 15,000, or three to four per cent.

According to a leading newspaper "the Goan community brought a unique touch of exuberance and vivacity to the Karachi of the 1960s".

In 1975 Luke Andrades introduced Grandmaster Ashraf Tai at the KGA Gymkhana and started Tai's Karate Center.

1986 was the year KGA celebrated 100 years. From 2003 to 2012 the president was Valentine Gonsalves.

In 2011 the Karachi Goan Association celebrated 125 years. A special brochure highlighting its history was printed on the occasion. Migration to Canada and Australia has shrunk the club's membership. In the 1940s the KGA had about 1,300 members, in 2012 there are only 483.

== Sports ==
Peter Paul Fernandes, an Olympian, played with the KGA hockey team. His playing position was forward.

Ian Fyfe, a leading wicket taker for the KGA cricket team, was among the top slow left arm spin bowlers of Karachi at that time. He was also a playing coach for the KGA cricket team.
