= Gabol =

Tribe in Pakistan

The Gabol (Urdu: گبول) is a Baloch tribe having a distinct identity through the centuries.

== Etymology ==
Edward Lipinski, an authority on Arameans, writes:

"There is no reason why 'Gambulu' (a powerful Aramean tribe at Iran-Iraq border), which shows either dissimilation bb>mb in 'Gabbol' or simply epenthetic(طُفیلی) 'm' appearing before 'b'."

Similarly, Dr. Mir Alam Khan Raqib states:

"The letter 'm' in word 'Gambol' seems redundant and hard. So, due to its hardness the letter 'm' obsoleted and the word transformed to Gabol, still a well-known Baloch tribe."

== Ancient Chaldo-Aramean tribes ==
The Bible first mentioned Gabol during 1600 BC, being a great-grandchild of Abraham by his third wife Keturah, daughter of Yaqtan the Canaanite. Madyan was a son of Abraham by Keturah mentioned in the Quran and other historical sources. Madyan had five sons, Ephah (عیفا), Epher (عفر), Hanoch (حنوک), Abida (عبیداع ), and Eldaah (الدّعا). Gabol was one of the four sons of Eldaah. He and his people migrated to Babylonia.

Assyrian sources call them a powerful Aramean tribe. "Aram" has been an alternative name for Syria (especially the region between the Euphrates and Balikh rivers). This region is also known as Aram-Naharaim. The Gabol tribe migrated from this part of Syria to southern Mesopotamia, and for this particular reason, Assyrians affirm them as Arameans (people from Aram Naharaim). The second largest migration of Arameans into Mesopotamia is entitled as Chaldeans. The autonomous state of Gaboli was one of the six states of Chaldea. It was the headquarters of the Gabol tribe residing near the border of Elam and the Persian Gulf. The fortified city Shapi'bal was the capital of Gaboli. The forefront troops of Mardukh-Baladan were composed of Gabols. They fought the Assyrians from 745 BC to 626 BC, leading to the formation of the Medean Empire along with other allies.

Sennacherib (703-681 BC) accounts the Gabol tribe as:

"Pastoral Nomad tribes who dwell on the bank of Tigris, the Garmu, the Ubulu, the Damunu, the Gabol, the Khindaru, the Ruh'ua, the Bugati or Bugutu who dwell on the bank of Karkh, the Hamaran, the Hagaran, the Nabatu, the Li,tau. Arameans who were not submissive, who take no heed of death. Chaldean, Aramean, Mannai (Medians) who had not been submissive to my yoke, I tore away from their lands."

Historians have described the Gabol tribe. Their observations are investigative while Western historians benefited from the archaeological excavation documents. Both groups agree that Gabol belongs to the Chaldo-Aramean association of Arab nomads. They are first mentioned in the twelfth century BC. The tablets of Assyrian archaeology describe their mettle and bravery. The ancient autonomous state of Gaboli and the Gabol region near Aleppo have been recorded by Qudama Bin Ja'far (قدامہ بن جعفر), Ibn E Rusta (ابنِ رُستہ), Soomer (سُومر), Yaqoubi (یعقوبی), Ibn E Haukal (ابن حوقل), Majeed Zada (مجید زادہ،), Ibn E Abdul Munim Hameri (ابن عبدالمنعم حمیری), Al Kindi (الکندی), Ibn E Wasil (ابنِ واصل), Muqaddasi (مقدسی), Al Balazri (البلازری) Gazi (غزی), Sadir (صادر), Yaqout (یاقوت) and others in their writings.

== Civil wars ==
During the Talpur rule in Sindh, the Gabol tribe was delegated to secure the coastal area of Karachi, recalled as the "War with Pirates". Corsairs used to loot ships near Karachi Port; once they invaded the port itself. Gabols are also mentioned in the 10th century A.D. in the outskirts of Karachi as fighting Arghun and Mongols. Nabi Bux Khan Baloch described the following wars and tribal disputes of the Gabol tribe in his books.

- Gandba Mandani attacks Burfats
- War between Jakhars & Gabols
- War between Kalmati Gabols & Kalhoras
- War between Kalmati Gabols & Jokhyas
- War between Gabols & Gadro
- First war between Gabols & Burfats at Kirthar Mountains
- First war between Kalmati Gabols & Jokhyas at Makli
- Second war between Kalmati Gabols & Jokhyas at Makli
- War at Qadman
- War at Gha'ghi
- Tribal dispute between Gabols & Burras
- War between Magsi & Rind clans
- Second war between Gabols & Burfats at Kirthar Mountains
- War between Gabols & Jokhyas with Bludgeon at Sukhan
- War between Gabols & Corsair (Pirates) at Karachi Port
- War with Jamoots
- War between Gabol & Mahar
- Tribal dispute between Gabol & Banglani
- Tribal dispute between Gabol & Bozdar Tribe
