= People's Football Stadium =

Football stadium in Karachi, Pakistan

- Interactive map of People's Football Stadium
- Location: Karachi, Sindh, Pakistan
- Coordinates: 24°51′31″N 66°59′18″E
- Owner: Karachi Metropolitan Corporation (formerly City District Government)
- Operator: Karachi Metropolitan Corporation
- Capacity: 40,000
- Surface: Grass

Construction
- Groundbreaking: 1988
- Opened: 9 December 1995
- Renovated: 2025; 1 year ago
- Cost: USD 30.7 Million

Tenant
- Pakistan national football team (2003–present)

The People's Football Stadium is a football stadium located in Lyari, a neighbourhood in Mauripur Road, Lyari, in Karachi, Sindh, Pakistan. The stadium can accommodate 25,000 spectators, and has an upgradable seating capacity of 40,000. Owned by the Karachi Metropolitan Corporation, the stadium serves as one of the home venues for the Pakistan national football team. Other major sports venues operated by the Karachi Metropolitan Corporation include the KMC Sports Complex in Kashmir Road, Women Sports Complex in Gulshan-e-Iqbal, Landhi Sports Complex in Landhi, KMC Football Stadium on Nishtar Road, and Badar-ul-Hasan Sports Complex in Nazimabad.

The stadium is part of the People's Sports Complex which also houses a boxing arena having capacity of 5,000 spectators, and a gymnasium sports complex where indoor sports like volleyball, badminton and basketball are played.

== History ==
The stadium was built in 1988, and opened on 9 December 1995 by the provincial government Pakistan Peoples Party and Prime Minister Benazir Bhutto. Covering an area of 40,000 square metres (10 acres), it was constructed on the site of Ganji Ground, an open football area containing four training pitches used by more than 20 local clubs. Construction of the complex removed these pitches, reportedly depriving the clubs of their former training grounds. The stadium had been built to promote sports and host international football matches, but within years of its completion, it was occupied by law-enforcement agencies such as the Pakistan Rangers for keeping an eye on the law and order situation in the area.

Apart from being one of the main venues of several national sports events such as the National Games of Pakistan, or football events such as the Pakistan Premier League, PFF League and the PFF National Challenge Cup, the stadium was aimed to became one of the home venues for international matches. On 6 September 2000, it hosted the 2000–01 Asian Cup Winners' Cup match between Khan Research Laboratories and Thai club BEC Tero Sasana. In March 2002, it hosted test matches between Pakistan and Ulsan Hyundai, and also hosted the 2002 AFC Youth Championship qualification group 5 matches. It hosted the 2006 FIFA World Cup qualification match against Kyrgyzstan on 29 November 2003. Two years later, the stadium hosted the 2005 SAARC Gold Cup. It also hosted all the matches in the inaugural Karachi Football League and Super Football League in 2007.

After years of inactivity due to the ban on Pakistan Football Federation by FIFA, and after 11 years since Pakistan ever held an international football event, the stadium was considered as one of the potential venues for the 2026 FIFA World Cup qualification on 17 October 2023, however it was ultimately deemed unfit by not meeting FIFA standards.

== Football tournaments ==
=== 2005 SAFF Gold Cup ===
The stadium was the venue for the 2005 SAFF Gold Cup.

Date	Team #1	Res.	Team #2	Round	Attendance
7 December 2005	Pakistan	1–0	Sri Lanka	Group stage	N/A
7 December 2005	Maldives	9–1	Afghanistan	Group stage	N/A
8 December 2005	Bangladesh	3–0	Bhutan	Group stage	N/A
8 December 2005	India	2–1	Nepal	Group stage	N/A
9 December 2005	Maldives	2–0	Sri Lanka	Group stage	N/A
9 December 2005	Pakistan	1–0	Afghanistan	Group stage	N/A
10 December 2005	Bangladesh	2–0	Nepal	Group stage	N/A
10 December 2005	India	3–0	Bhutan	Group stage	N/A
11 December 2005	Sri Lanka	1–2	Afghanistan	Group stage	N/A
11 December 2005	Pakistan	0–0	Maldives	Group stage	N/A
12 December 2005	Nepal	3–1	Bhutan	Group stage	N/A
12 December 2005	Bangladesh	1–1	India	Group stage	N/A
14 December 2005	Maldives	0–1	India	Semi-finals	N/A
14 December 2005	Bangladesh	1–0	Pakistan	Semi-finals	N/A
17 December 2005	India	2–0	Bangladesh	Final	N/A

== See also ==
- List of football stadiums in Pakistan
