= People's Sports Complex =

Multi-sport complex in Karachi, Pakistan

- Interactive map of People's Sports Complex
- Address: Mauripur Road
- Location: Lyari, Karachi, Sindh, Pakistan
- Coordinates: 24°51′31″N 66°59′18″E
- Owner: Karachi Metropolitan Corporation
- Operator: Karachi Metropolitan Corporation
- Acreage: 10 acres (4.0 ha)

Construction
- Groundbreaking: 1992–93
- Opened: 9 December 1995; 30 years ago
- Cost: Rs130 million

The People's Sports Complex is a sports complex on Mauripur Road in Lyari, Karachi, Pakistan. Operated by the Karachi Metropolitan Corporation, it comprises the People's Football Stadium, a multipurpose indoor gymnasium, the Ustad Abdullah Baloch boxing arena and associated boxing-training facilities. Other major sports venues operated by the Karachi Metropolitan Corporation include the KMC Sports Complex in Kashmir Road, Women Sports Complex in Gulshan-e-Iqbal, Landhi Sports Complex in Landhi, KMC Football Stadium on Nishtar Road, and Badar-ul-Hasan Sports Complex in Nazimabad.

The complex occupies 10 acres (4.0 ha) and was inaugurated by prime minister Benazir Bhutto on 9 December 1995.

== History ==
The complex was constructed on the site of Ganji Ground, an open football area containing four training pitches used by more than 20 local clubs. Construction of the complex removed these pitches, reportedly depriving the clubs of their former training grounds.

The foundation of the complex was laid during 1992–93. It was inaugurated on 9 December 1995 after being constructed for Rs130 million. It was commissioned by former prime minister and Pakistan Peoples Party member Benazir Bhutto.

=== Occupation and maintenance ===
The Rangers occupied much of the complex from around the time it opened amid security operations in Karachi. In 2005, KMC staff controlled only three of the 74 rooms constructed around the football stadium. The Rangers used People’s Stadium as an operational base, and as their regional headquarters, while still occasionally hosting sporting events.

Maintenance problems were reported repeatedly. Before the 2002 AFC Youth Championship qualification, the football pitch contained bare sandy areas and craters, while its electronic scoreboard had never operated because the former KMC had not completed payment to the supplier. In 2005, approximately 2,000 seats were reported damaged, the complex faced a daily water shortage, and officials sought advertising and event-hire income to fund maintenance. In 2018, Karachi mayor Wasim Akhtar included People's Sports Complex among four KMC complexes proposed for upgrading to international standards.

== Facilities ==
=== People's Football Stadium ===
The People's Football Stadium is the principal facility in the complex.

=== Indoor gymnasium ===
The multipurpose indoor gymnasium is designed to accommodate indoor sports. The complex has hosted international handball tournaments.

=== Boxing facilities ===
The boxing arena is known as the Ustad Abdullah Baloch Boxing Stadium or gymnasium. An adjacent training hall houses the Pak National Boxing Club and a fitness centre.

The facilities have continued to host boxing training and competition. British-Pakistani boxer Amir Khan visited the complex and trained with young Lyari boxers in August 2015. In 2022, the arena hosted the Mai Kolachi Cup men's and women's boxing championships.

== Major events ==
The complex's football stadium staged the 2002 AFC Youth Championship qualification group in April 2002 as the first international tournament held at the complex. It subsequently hosted the 2005 SAFF Gold Cup.

People's Stadium hosted the opening ceremony of the 30th National Games on 9 April 2007. The complex has also served as a regular domestic football venue.

During the Karachi Games in March 2023, the boxing competition was assigned to People's Sports Complex.

== See also ==
- People's Football Stadium
- KMC Sports Complex
- List of sports venues in Karachi
