= Government of Karachi =

Administrative body of Pakistani city

Municipal Government of Karachi شہری حکومتِ کراچی
- Local government
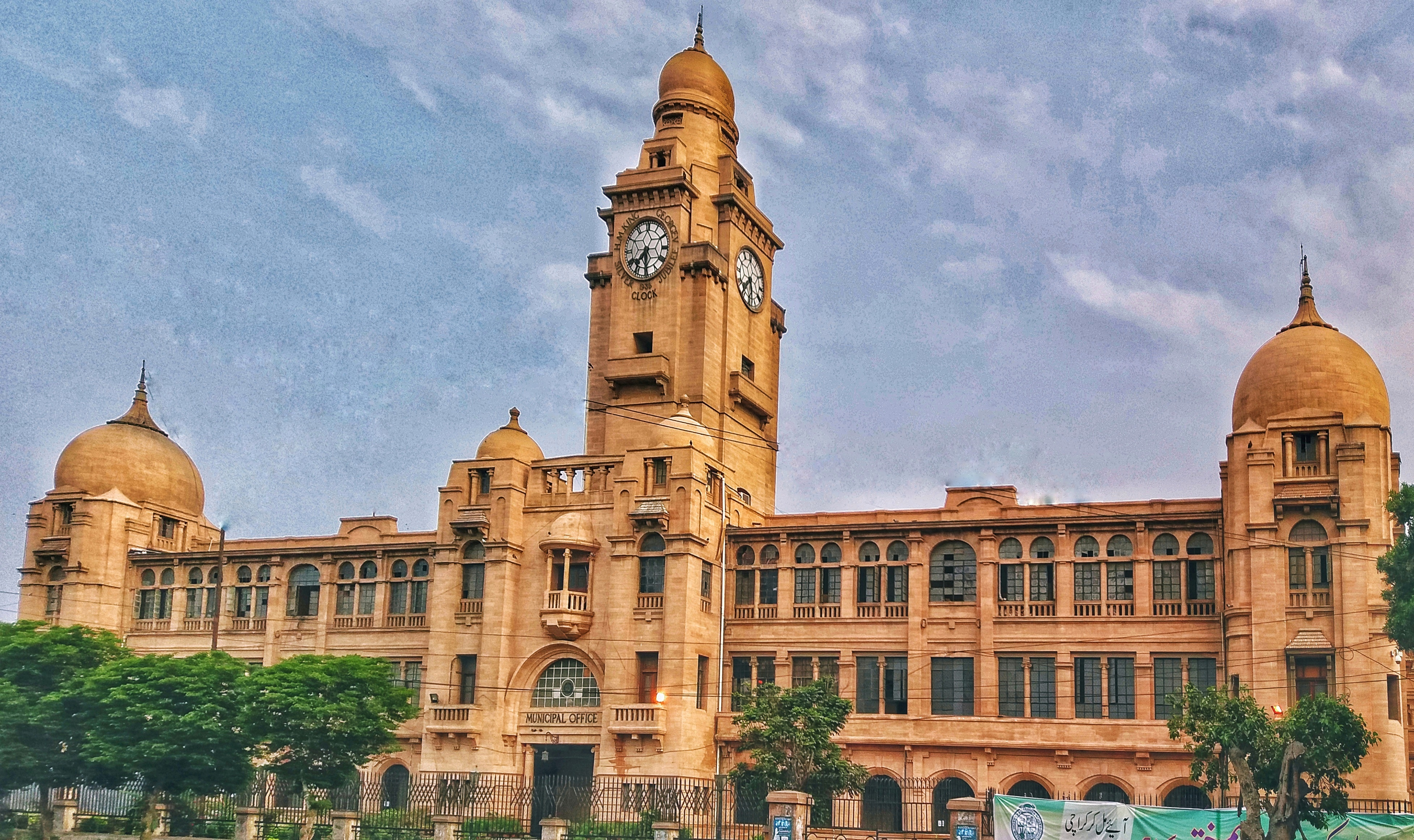
- Karachi Metropolitan Corporation Building
- Formation: 1933
- Current document: Sindh Local Government Act (SPLGA 2013)
- Territory: Karachi
- Country: Pakistan
- Website: www.kmc.gos.pk

Legislative branch
- Legislative council: City Council
- Meeting place: City Council Hall

Executive branch
- Mayor: Murtaza Wahab
- Deputy Mayor: Salman Murad
- Appointed by: City Council
- Headquarters: KMC Building, M. A. Jinnah Road, Saddar
- Main organ: Karachi Metropolitan Corporation

The Municipal Government of Karachi is the administrative body for the city of Karachi, Sindh, Pakistan. Presently the Municipal Local Government Karachi consists mainly of the Karachi Metropolitan Corporation, headed by the Mayor or Administrator.

== Municipal local government Karachi system history ==
=== Karachi City Municipal Act, Colonial LG system (1933) ===
The City of Karachi Municipal Act was promulgated in 1933. Initially the Municipal Corporation consisted of the Mayor, the Deputy Mayor and 57 Councillors. The system was handled by bureaucrats at all tiers of the government, there was no financial devolution. The institutions were never truly empowered, as the Deputy Commissioner; a district level agent of the non-representative central bureaucracy was the principal actor at the local level. The British rule introduced rural urban divide to the local level. The urban councils were created to cater municipal services while the rural councils were used to homogenize local elite.

=== Electoral College Ordinance (1958-1969) ===
This was promulgated by Ayub Khan and contained some authorities such as the LG system could levy some taxes, political parties were banned from participating in the LG elections but like the colonial system the bureaucrats still presided all tiers of the government above UC (Union counsel). Yahya Khan became the new president. Under Martial Law he issued the order No. 24 to terminate all local council's chairmen, vice chairmen and councilors with the appointment of government officials.

The system consisted of two bodies, Karachi municipal corporation and Divisional council and their functions were establishment of college, schools, parks, municipal gardens. Divisional council had a special committee which looked after planning and development of roads, educational institutions and residential societies.

This system upheld colonial urban-rural divide. The system had four tiers;

Tiers of Electoral College
Tier	Rural Areas	Urban Areas
Tier 1	Divisional Council	Divisional Council
Tier 2	District Council	District Council
Tier 3	Tehsil Council	Municipal Committee/Cantonement Board
Tier 4	Union Council	Town Committee/Union Committee

The Union council members were directly elected but subsequent tiers consisted of indirectly elected officials nominated by the government and pre appointed officials, hence the system was ruled by bureaucracy which could suspend resolutions, end the proceedings and overrule any action of the local bodies.

=== Sindh Local Government Act (1973) ===
In the Sindh Local government act 1973 (amended in 1976), the Karachi Metropolitan Corporation was established. In 1976, the Karachi Municipal Corporation was upgraded to the Karachi Metropolitan Corporation. The administrative area of Karachi was a second-level subdivision known as the Karachi Division, which was subdivided into five districts: Karachi Central, Karachi East, Karachi South, Karachi West, and Malir. No elections were held under this system. Although never implemented, the act abolished bureaucracy and provided representation of members through direct elections.

=== Sindh Local Government Ordinance 1979 ===
This act was passed by the military dictator General Zia ul Haq which resembled the Local government system of Ayub Khan. The Urban local governance consisted of Town Committees, Municipal Committees, Municipal Corporations and Metropolitan Corporations. In the Rural Areas the system provided a three tier system: Union Councils, Tehsil or Taluka Councils and District Councils. This system upheld urban-rural divide but provided Local councils considerable power to launch schemes, review and implement development programs, and perform functions of other government Departments. In 1992, the elected mayor system was abolished and the appointed Administrator System was implemented from 1992 to 2001.

According to the act, the Karachi Metropolitan Corporation had a mandate of overseeing medical facilities, fire fighting, town planning, municipal police, kutchi abadi, civil defence. Karachi water & Sewerage Board board, and Karachi Development Authority housing schemes.

The Karachi Metropolitan Corporation didn't get to acquire the power for property tax collection under the act despite several efforts by its mayors which accounted for 7.2% of its total revenues, the Sindh government was inefficient in collecting property tax and according to the world bank Staff Upraisal report of 1993, delegating it to Karachi Metropolitan Corporation could have raised its potential from Rs 200 million to Rs 2 billion.

==== SLGO 1987 amendment ====
in 1987 Sindh government made Zonal Municipal Committees and delegated most of the development powers of the Karachi Metropolitan Corporation to four DMCs East, west, Central and South respectively, similar to District Municipal corporations of 2016.

=== Sindh Local Government Ordinance (LGO of 2001) ===
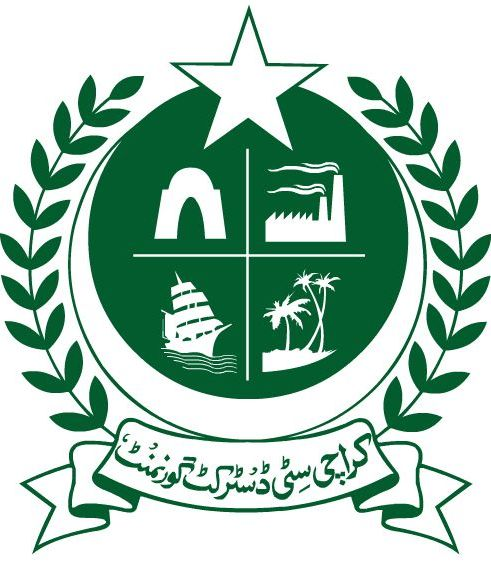
City District Government Karachi logo

In January 2000 In 2001, President of Pakistan enacted a new system of Local Governance in Pakistan in the form of the Local Government Ordinance (LGO of 2001) which allowed a stronger local government in Karachi. The mayor of Karachi was empowered to make decisions regarding city management. The Ordinance designed a new devolution of financial resources and responsibilities back to the City of Karachi. This plan abolished the earlier second-level division and merged the five districts of Karachi into a Karachi District. When the devolution plan was implemented in 2001, this district officially became a City District, with the City District Government of Karachi (CDGK) overseeing the administration of the area. In 2008, the new government abolished the Local Government Ordinance and the Government of Karachi on 14 February 2010.

Under the LGO of 2001, the Mayor of Karachi had control over city planning, the Karachi Water & Sewage Board (KW&SB), the Karachi Building Control Authority (KBCA), the Karachi Development Authority, the Karachi Revenue Department and the Karachi Land Registry. The funds for those organizations were also directly accessible to the mayor. The powers of the Mayor didn't include supervision over law Enforcement and the Mayor still had to get funding from the President of Pakistan. Since the Karachi Development Authority was directly placed under the supervision of Mayor of Karachi, the Mayor's office was situated at the Civic Center within Karachi

The City District of Karachi was divided into 18 Towns, each governed by elected municipal administrations responsible for infrastructure and spatial planning, development facilitation, and municipal services (water, sanitation, solid waste, repairing roads, parks, street lights, and traffic engineering). The towns were sub-divided into 178 localities governed by elected Union Councils (UC's), which were the core element of the local government system. Each UC was a body of thirteen directly elected members including a Nazim (mayor) and a Naib Nazim (deputy mayor). The UC Nazim headed the Union Administration and was responsible for working with the CDG to plan and execute municipal services, as well as for informing higher authorities about public concerns and complaints.

1. CDGK (Defunct, KMC & KDA) (30.9%)
2. Kirthar National Park (20.7%)
3. Government of Sindh (17.7%)
4. LDA (5.60%)
5. DHA (5.00%)
6. Private (3.90%)
7. MDA (3.90%)
8. KPT (2.80%)
9. Recent Allocations (Industrial, Education etc) (2.70%)
10. Cantonement Board (2.10%)
11. Cooperative Housing Societies (1.80%)
12. PQA (1.50%)
13. SITE (0.60%)
14. Government of Pakistan (0.50%)
15. Railways (0.40%)

The district bureaucracy was made accountable to the elected representatives which gave strength to the local government system and boosted the development process. The rural urban divide was abolished in this act. This system also established Provincial Finance commission and provided funding to the local government, major portion of these funds were used to pay staff salaries, the Mayor had power to device budget of the districts but had no power on the allocation of PFC awards.

The Mayor of Karachi despite being granted much more powers than previous terms was responsible for only 31% of the total land area of Karachi.

=== Sindh People's Local Government Ordinance (SPLGO 2012) ===
The Sindh People's Local Government Ordinance (SPLGO 2012), passed by Sindh Assembly, proposed the creation of five districts with the City of Karachi: Karachi, Hyderabad, Sukkur, Larkana, and Mirpurkhas. The Ordinance was promising and empowered to the Mayor and Deputy Mayor, but it was discarded by the Assembly on 21 February 2013.

=== Sindh Local Government Act (SPLGA 2013) ===
After a gap of six years, the Government of Karachi was finally restored by the Supreme Court of Pakistan when the Court in 2014 ordered that provinces conduct new local government elections, which were held on 5 December 2015 resulting with a new Karachi Government being formed on 30 August 2016. The current Karachi Local Government System follows the Sindh Local Government Act of 2013 (SLGA 2013). The office of the mayor is located in the Karachi Metropolitan Corporation Building.

The Karachi Local Government system consists of the Karachi Metropolitan Corporation which is subdivided into of 6 District Municipal Corporations each headed by a chairman and deputy chairman. The districts of the Karachi Local Government are, as of Sindh Local Government Act of 2013 are District Central, District West, District East, District South, District Malir and District Korangi. The Sindh Local Government Act also proposed the formation of a 7th district called the 'District Council' which comprises the rural areas within Karachi that didn't come under the purview of the Karachi Metropolitan Corporation. Each district is further divided into Union Committees which are headed by a chairman and vice-chairman. Each Union Committee is further subdivided into four Wards. Citizens directly elect their Union Committee Board and their 4 ward members. Some seats in the Union Committees are reserved for women, non-Muslim minorities, and young citizens. All the members of the Union Committee directly elected a chairman and vice-chairman.

The Chairmen of all the Union Committees form the City Council (and oversee the Karachi Metropolitan Corporation) and elect the mayor and deputy mayor, while the vice-chairmen of all the Union Committee elect the chairman and vice-chairman of the District Municipal Corporation and works in District Municipal Corporation office.

The Mayor now has to ask the Sindh Government for the funds, and has to form a joint account with the Commissioner of Karachi, whose approval is required for any funds to be used. Following the colonial system of rural and urban divide, the SPLGA 2013 divided rural areas into District counsels which were kept independent from the metropolitan corporation. The SPLGA 2013 resembles the SLGO 1979 which brought back the urban rural division.

== Budget ==
The Karachi Metropolitan Corporation and Karachi budget are formulated by its mayors and administrators .

Fiscal Year	Amount (Rs. Billion)	Amount ($. Million)	Mayor	Administrator	Notes
1970-71	0.1008		-		
1971-72	0.103		-		
1972-73	0.113		-		
1973-74	0.162		-		
1974-75	0.191		-		
1975-76	0.243		-		
1976-77	0.253		-		
1977-78	0.324		-		
1978-79	0.388		-		
1979-80	0.459		Abdul Sattar Afghani		
1980-81	0.549		sic		
1981-82	0.628		sic		
1982-83	0.891		sic		
1983-84	0.940	70	sic	-	
1984-85	1.127	83.4	sic	-	
1985-86			sic		
1986-87			sic		
1987-88			sic		
1988-89	1.936	105	Farooq Sattar		revenues grew at an average rate of 11 per year from 1988 to 1992, well below the nominal growth of Karachi (ADB study).
1989-90	2.482	118	sic		revenues grew at an average rate of 11 per year from 1988 to 1992, well below the nominal growth of Karachi (ADB study).
1990-91			sic		revenues grew at an average rate of 11 per year from 1988 to 1992, well below the nominal growth of Karachi (ADB study).
1991-92	2.841	115	sic		revenues grew at an average rate of 11 per year from 1988 to 1992, well below the nominal growth of Karachi (ADB study).
1994-95	4.5	151	-	Faheem Zaman Khan	
2000-01	5.7	102	-	Faheem Zaman Khan	
2001-02	20.5	320	Naimatullah Khan	-	
2002-03	27.7	470	sic	-	
2003-04	32.6	560	sic	-	
2004-05	43.8	740	sic	-	
2006-07	44.2	730	Mustafa Kamal	-	
2007-08	45.695	750	sic	-	
2008-09	37.1	460	sic	-	
2009-10	52.36	610	sic	-	
2010-11	53.9	630	-	Fazl-ur-Rehman	
2011-12	44.5	510	-	M. Hussain Sayed	
2012-13	31.6	330	-	sic	
2013-14	35.5	330	-	Hashim Raza Zaidi	
2014-15	33.1	320	-	Rauf Akhter	
2015-16	33.8	320	-	Roshan Ali Sheikh	
2016-17	26.7	250	-	Laiq Ahmed	
2017-18	27.1	251	Waseem Akhter	-	
2018-19	27.1	220	sic	-	
2019-20	26.4	170	sic	-	
2020-21	24.8	150	sic	-	

== See also ==
- Mayor of Karachi
- Commissioner Karachi
- Administrator Karachi
- City District Government Karachi
