= Karachi Development Authority =

- اداره ترقیاتی کراچی
- Abbreviation: KDA
- Predecessor: Karachi Improvement Trust
- Established: 1957
- Type: Governmental organisation
- Purpose: Urban planning
- Headquarters: Gulshan-e-Iqbal, Karachi
- Location: Karachi, Pakistan
- Region served: Karachi
- Parent organization: Government of Sindh
- Website: www.kda.gos.pk

Karachi Development Authority (اداره ترقیاتی کراچی) was established as the city-planning authority of Karachi in 1957, and replaced the earlier Karachi Improvement Trust (KIT). KDA, along with the Lyari Development Authority and Malir Development Authority, is responsible for the development of undeveloped lands around Karachi. KDA came under the control of Karachi's local government and mayor in 2001, but was later placed under direct control of the Government of Sindh in 2011. City-planning in Karachi, therefore, is devised at the provincial rather than local level.

== History ==
A municipal commission was established in 1852 to provide city-planning services in Karachi's residential zones - cantonment areas came under control of military administration rather can civic administration. In 1934, the city of Karachi Municipal Act was passed, which lead to the formation of the Karachi Municipal Corporation (KMC) that was responsible for development and maintenance of the city. After independence in 1947, KMC was superseded by the Karachi Improvement Trust (KIT), which was created to help manage the city after the influx of hundreds of thousands of refugees from India. KIT developed the first master plan for the city after independence, in conjunction with the Swedish firm Merz Randal Vetten (MRV).

The Karachi Development Authority (KDA) was established by the order No V of 1957 signed by President of Pakistan General Muhammad Ayub Khan for development and expansion of Karachi. The Karachi Municipal Corporation, on the hand, was tasked with maintenance of the already-developed parts of the city. KDA was given a large portion of land, and was directly responsible for its development. KDA, however, did not have control over federally-administered areas, such as cantonments or railway land.

The Karachi Development Authority was successor of Karachi Improvement Trust and launched its first scheme at the junction of National Stadium & Karsaz, known as Dhoraji Colony KDA Scheme 1-A. After improvement & development of its Scheme 1-A, KDA launched a "town expansion scheme" for Korangi Township, followed by Malir Town, Drigh Township, Malir Extension Township, Drigh Township, North Karachi Township, Old Nazimabad, North Nazimabad, Orangi Township, Baldia Township, Lyari Town, Hawksbay, Shah Latif, Mehran Town, Halkani Town, Landhi Industrial Area, Landhi Residential Scheme, Metroville-I to III, Gulzar-e-Hijri, Gulshan-e-Iqbal, Gulistan-e-Jauhar, Taiser Town, Korangi Industrial Area, and SITE Metroville. KDA also undertook civil engineering improvement schemes, such as Karachi Greater water channel scheme, Malir River Flood Protection Bund, among other. KDA is also responsible for approving master plans for private housing societies within the territorial limit of Karachi City.

In 1993 and 1994, the Lyari Development Authority (LDA) and Malir Development Authority (MDA) were established.

In 2001 under the rule of General Pervez Musharraf, the KDA, LDA, MDA, and KMC were devolved to Karachi's local administration under the control of Mayor Syed Mustafa Kamal as part of the now-defunct City District Government Karachi. Kamal earned international accolade for his improvements to the city, and in 2010 won the World Mayor Prize for his achievements.

Control of the KDA was removed from Karachi's local government in 2011, and was handed back to the provincial administration. The KMC was revived to deal with maintenance of the city, but the board only controls about 33% of Karachi's urbanized area - with the remainder under the control of the federal or provincial government. The LDA and MDA were also revived by the Pakistan Peoples Party government, in order to patronize their electoral constituencies and voting banks.

== Departments ==
Engineering Department
Estate & Enforcement Department
Finance and Account Department
Information Technology Department
Karachi Mass Transit Cell
Land Management
Law Department
Lines Area Redevelopment Project Department
Medical Department
Parks and Recreation Department
Planning and Urban Design Department
Pre-Stressed Pipe Factory Department
Public Housing Scheme Department
Public Relation, Department
Purchase Department
Recoveries Department
Secretariat Department
Security Department
Traffic Engineering Department

== KDA Schemes ==
- KDA Scheme No.1 Dilkusha
- KDA Scheme No.2 Taimuria
- KDA Scheme No.3 & 4 Muzaffarabad
- KDA Scheme No.5 Kehkashan
- KDA Scheme No.7 Stadium Road
- KDA Scheme No.16 Mansura
- KDA Scheme No.24 Gulshan e Iqbal
- KDA Scheme No.25 Shah Latif Town
- KDA Scheme No.33 Gulzar e Hijri
- KDA Scheme No.36 Gulistan e Johar
- KDA Scheme No.41 Surjani Town
- KDA Scheme No.45 Gulshan e Maymar

== See also ==
- Karachi Metropolitan Corporation
- Karachi Conservancy Board
- Karachi Municipal Commission
- Karachi Municipal Committee
- City District Government of Karachi
- Government of Karachi
- Mayor of Karachi
- Commissioner Karachi
- Administrator of Karachi
- Malir Development Authority
- Lyari Development Authority
