= Administrator of Karachi =

Position in the Government of Sindh

- منتظم کراچی
- Incumbent; Vacant since 5 January 2023
- Karachi Metropolitan Corporation
- Seat: KMC Building
- Appointer: Government of Sindh
- Website: Karachi Metropolitan Corporation

The Administrator Karachi is an Officer in the Pakistan Administrative Services, usually of the elite rank of BS-20 (Grade 20).

== Incumbent ==
Dr. Saif-ur-Rehman, an officer of PAS (BS-20), was appointed as Karachi Administrator on 8 December 2022.

== Administrator of Karachi ==
This position handles the administration of the government in and around Karachi, in the province of Sindh. The position of Administrator and Commissioner in the Karachi Division is considered to be one of the most senior positions in the Government of Sindh.

== List of Administrators of Karachi ==
List of Administrator Karachi
No	Name of Administrator Karachi	Starting term	Ending term	Notes
1	Iftikhar Ali Shallwani	7 September 2020	5 December 2020	
2	Laeeq Ahmed	5 December 2020	5 August 2021	
3	Murtaza Wahab	5 August 2021	8 December 2022	PPPP
4	Dr. Saifur Rehman	8 December 2022	5 January 2023	PAS (BS-20)

== List of Commissioner Karachi ==
In September 2020, the Commissioner of Karachi was Mr. Iftikhar Ali Shallwani, an Officer of the Pakistan Administrative Service with the elite rank of BS-21 / Grade 21.

As of December 2020, the Commissioner of Karachi is Mr. Navid Ahmed Shaikh, holding the same elite rank.

== See also ==
- Karachi Development Authority
- Malir Development Authority
- Lyari Development Authority
- Karachi Metropolitan Corporation
- Commissioners of Sind in British India
- Commissioner Karachi
- Governor of Sindh
- Mayor of Karachi
