= KMC Sports Complex =

Sport complex in Karachi, Pakistan

- Interactive map of KMC Sports Complex
- Former names: City Sports Complex; CDGK Sports Complex
- Address: Kashmir Road
- Location: Karachi, Sindh, Pakistan
- Owner: Karachi Metropolitan Corporation
- Operator: Karachi Metropolitan Corporation
- Acreage: 4.9 to 5.3 hectares

Construction
- Built: 1974
- Opened: 1974

The KMC Sports Complex, also known as the Kashmir Road Sports Complex, is a multi-sport complex on Kashmir Road in Karachi, Sindh, Pakistan. Owned and operated by the Karachi Metropolitan Corporation, the complex was constructed in 1974 and covers approximately 4.9 to 5.3 hectares (12 to 13 acres). Other major sports venues operated by the Karachi Metropolitan Corporation include the Women Sports Complex in Gulshan-e-Iqbal, Landhi Sports Complex in Landhi, KMC Football Stadium on Nishtar Road, People's Sports Complex in Lyari and Badar-ul-Hasan Sports Complex in Nazimabad.

The complex contains facilities for swimming, football, futsal, badminton, tennis, squash, basketball, volleyball, table tennis and other sports. It was redeveloped during the 2010s and early 2020s, including construction or renovation of a football ground, futsal and badminton courts, a pavilion and swimming facilities.

== Name ==
The venue has been known by several names reflecting changes in Karachi's municipal administration. It was originally called KMC Sports Complex, named after the Karachi Municipal Corporation. During the period of the City District Government Karachi, the complex was renamed as City Sports Complex and CDGK Sports Complex. After the renaming to Karachi Metropolitan Corporation, it was again renamed as KMC Sports Complex. It is also called Kashmir Road Sports Complex, distinguishing it from other KMC-operated facilities in Karachi.

== History ==
The complex was constructed on Kashmir Road in 1974 as a public sports facility. A large portion of the premises was later occupied by the Pakistan Rangers until 2000. During this period and afterward, areas of the site were converted into commercial marriage lawns. By 2006, at least twelve lawns were operating on land associated with the complex, while several sporting facilities had deteriorated through lack of funding and maintenance.

In 2018, Karachi mayor Wasim Akhtar said marriage lawns and offices at the Kashmir Road complex had been removed in compliance with a Supreme Court order concerning encroachments on parks and playgrounds.

=== Redevelopment ===
A development programme begun in 2013 proposed a bowling alley, new squash courts, futsal and badminton facilities, a volleyball court, three cricket practice pitches, a football ground and a pavilion for more than 2,000 spectators. A proposed synthetic athletics track was dropped because of insufficient funding. The programme experienced repeated delays following the death of a contractor, KMC's financial difficulties and the COVID-19 pandemic.

The reconstructed football ground was inaugurated in June 2022 after having been closed for approximately a decade. Futsal and badminton courts were inaugurated in October 2022, when the municipal administration also reported that repairs had been made to the swimming pool's diving board.

In preparation for the 2025 National Games, the swimming pool underwent a further Rs150 million reconstruction. The new pool was inaugurated on 1 December 2025.

== Facilities ==
Facilities at the complex include:

- Football ground and adjoining pavilion
- Futsal courts
- Badminton courts
- Swimming pool and diving facilities
- Tennis courts
- Squash courts
- Basketball court
- Volleyball court
- Cricket practice pitches
- Facilities for table tennis and snooker
- Jogging and skating tracks

== Events and public use ==
The complex has hosted municipal sports programmes, coaching camps and provincial and national competitions. Its tennis courts staged Sindh Tennis Association and national-ranking tournaments in 2010. KMC has also used the complex for summer coaching programmes in swimming, skating, futsal, gymnastics and taekwondo.

The complex was selected as the proposed administrative secretariat for the 2025 National Games. During the Games, held in Karachi in December 2025, its football ground staged softball and its rebuilt swimming pool hosted the swimming programme.

== See also ==
- List of sports venues in Karachi
- Sport in Pakistan
