= Malir Development Authority =

- Malir Development Authority
- Website: https://mda.gos.pk/

Malir Development Authority (اداره ترقیاتی ملیر) was established to oversee the development of Malir in Karachi, Sindh, Pakistan. It was merged with the City District Government Karachi in 2001 but were reinstated after its dissolution.

== See also ==
- Malir Town
- Taiser Town
- Karachi Improvement Trust
- Karachi Metropolitan Corporation
- Karachi Municipal Commission
- Karachi Municipal Committee
- Karachi Municipal Corporation
- City District Government of Karachi
- Karachi Development Authority
- Lyari Development Authority
