= KMC Football Stadium =

Football stadium in Karachi, Pakistan

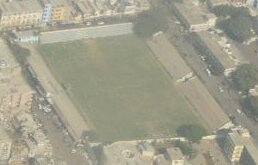
- An upper view of KMC Football Ground
- Interactive map of KMC Football Stadium
- Location: Saddar Town, Karachi, Pakistan
- Coordinates: 24°51′3″N 66°59′29″E
- Owner: Karachi Metropolitan Corporation
- Capacity: 15,000
- Surface: Grass

Construction
- Opened: 1956

Tenant
- Karachi Metropolitan Corporation FC (1956–2004)

The KMC Football Stadium is an association football stadium in Karachi, Pakistan, with a capacity of around 15,000. The stadium is owned by the Karachi Metropolitan Corporation. The stadium is distinct from and one of several major sports venues operated by the Karachi Metropolitan Corporation, alongside the KMC Sports Complex on Kashmir Road, Women Sports Complex in Gulshan-e-Iqbal, Landhi Sports Complex in Landhi, People's Sports Complex in Lyari and Badar-ul-Hasan Sports Complex in Nazimabad.

The stadium's name has changed in step with Karachi's civic administration. It was originally named after the Karachi Municipal Corporation, became the Karachi Metropolitan Corporation Stadium in 1976, was known as the CDGK Stadium during the City District Government Karachi era (2001–2010), and reverted to KMC Football Stadium after the KMC was restored in 2011.

It is one of the oldest stadiums in the country, and has hosted several international matches for the Pakistan national team.

== History ==
=== Early years ===
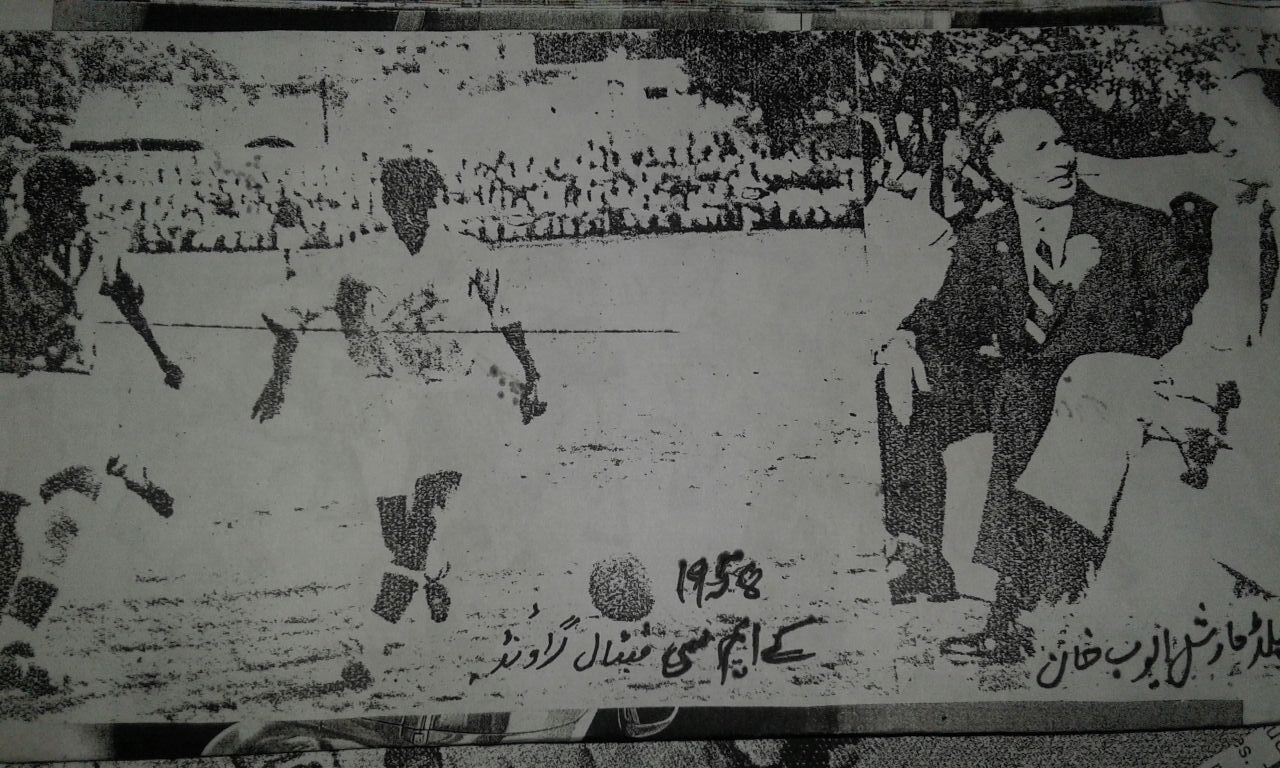
President of Pakistan Ayub Khan (far right) witnessing a football game at the KMC Stadium in 1958.

The stadium was built before the partition of India, as a piece of barren land surrounded by a 12 ft wall. In 1956, in a match featuring Keamari Union against Baloch Eleven, the pavilion collapsed with close to 100 people getting injured.

The then commissioner of Karachi, Ghulam Ahmed Madni, visited the ground after the tragedy, being instructed by the president of Pakistan Ayub Khan, to start the renovation work in 1962. The stadium also had their own club called KMC FC, which was formed in the same decade in which the venue was established.

=== 1968–2000 ===
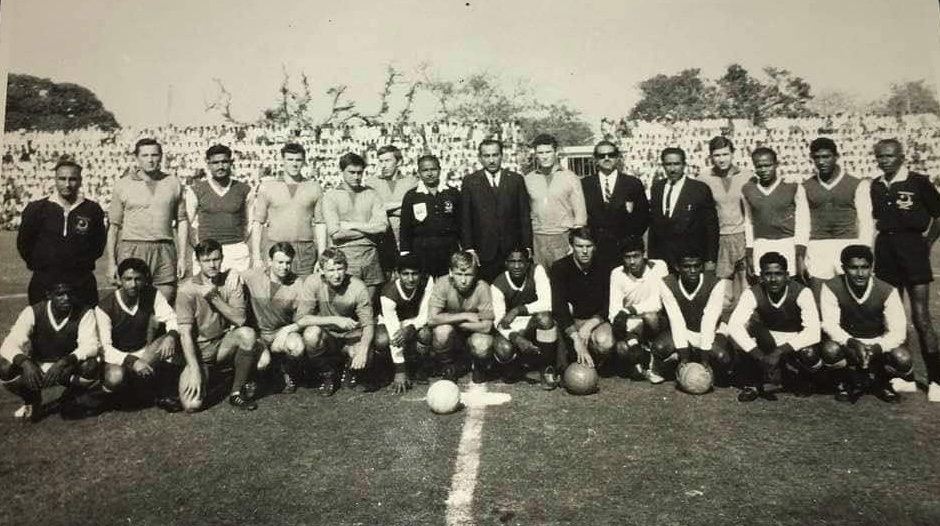
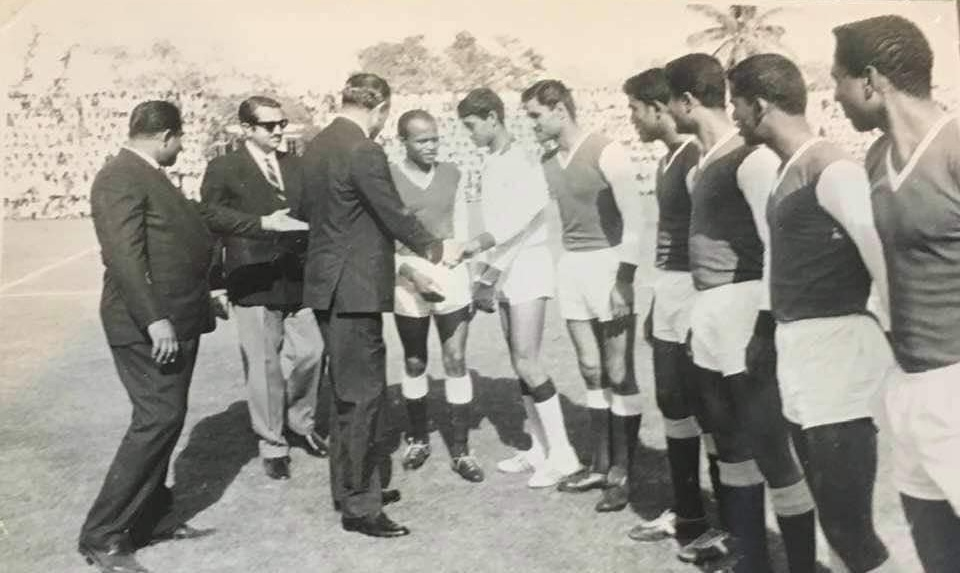
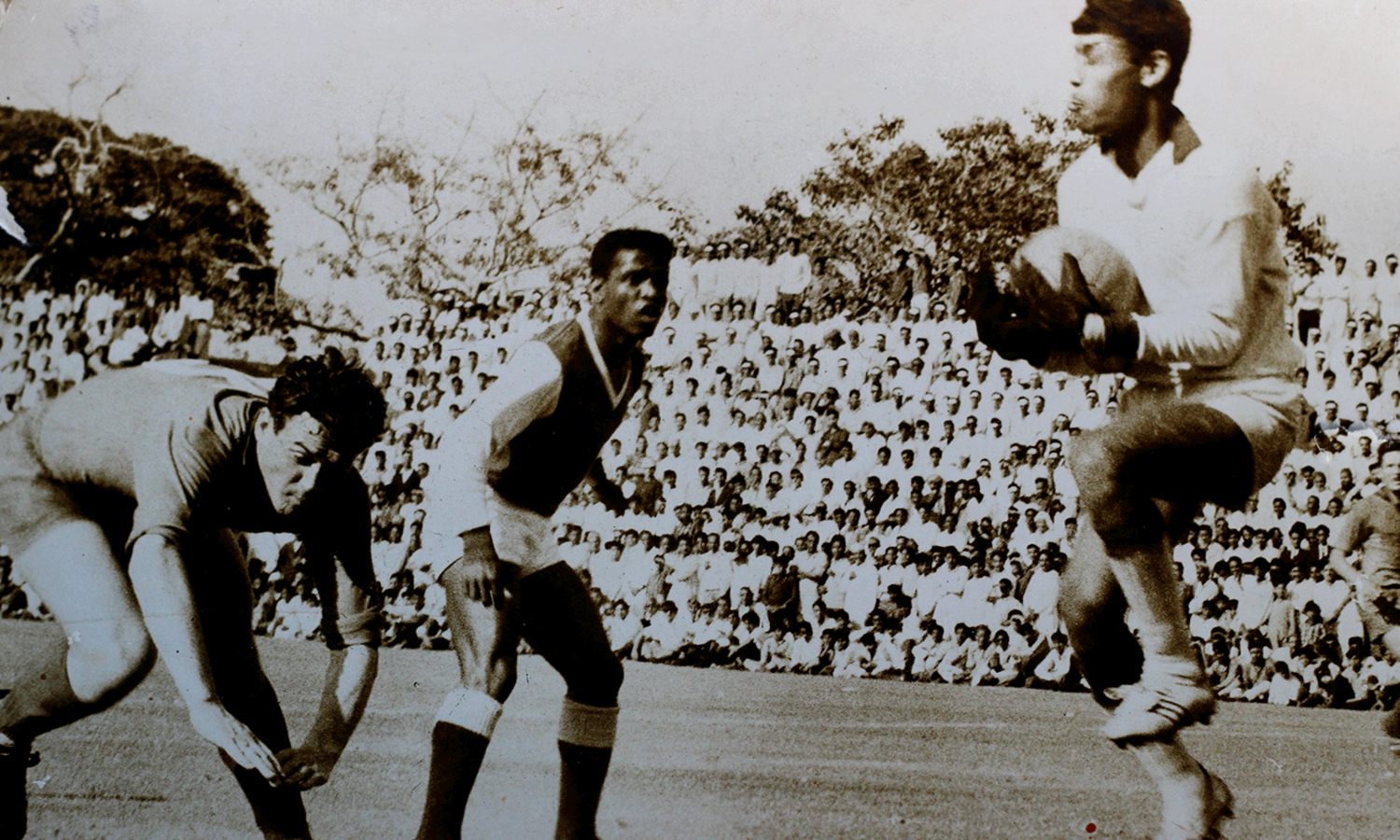
Pakistan national football team in a friendly against CSKA Moscow from the Soviet Union at the KMC Stadium on 28 February 1969

During the 1960s, the stadium hosted several friendly matches for the Pakistan national football team against touring sides such as Saudi Arabia in 1967, FC Kairat in 1968, and CSKA Moscow in 1969. In 1968, the stadium hosted its first tournament, which featured teams from former East Pakistan. The stadium, originally named after the Karachi Municipal Corporation, was renamed the Karachi Metropolitan Corporation Football Stadium following administrative restructuring in 1976. On 8 January 1983, the stadium hosted a match between Pakistan and the German South-West Region team. In 1989, former KMC football team player Ahmed Jan was appointed caretaker of the stadium, and continued in that role even after his official retirement from the KMC department in 2011. On 26 August 1999, Jan survived an assassination attempt when two gunmen, in an attempt to take control of the KMC ground, fired several shots at him.

=== CDGK era (2001–2010) ===
From 2001 to 2011, during the City District Government Karachi period, it was known as the CDGK Stadium. The venue hosted the 2009 Karachi Football League final between Shahzad Mohammadan and Nazimabad FC, with 15,000 people in attendance.

=== 2011–present ===
After the restoration of the Karachi Metropolitan Corporation in 2011, the stadium once again came under KMC's management, and reverted its name to KMC Stadium. KMC Stadium was one of the two venues for the 2021 National Women Football Championship.

== See also ==
- List of football stadiums in Pakistan
