= Women Sports Complex =

Complex in Gulshan-e-Iqbal, Karachi

The KMC Women Sports Complex, is located in Block-3, Gulshan-e-Iqbal, Karachi, Sindh, Pakistan. Other major sports venues operated by the Karachi Metropolitan Corporation include the KMC Sports Complex in Kashmir Road, Landhi Sports Complex in Landhi, KMC Football Stadium on Nishtar Road, People's Sports Complex in Lyari and Badar-ul-Hasan Sports Complex in Nazimabad.

== History ==
The complex was established on August 12, 2005.

== See also ==
- List of sports venues in Karachi
