= Lyari Development Authority =

Development authority in Karachi, Pakistan

- Lyari Development Authority
- Website: http://ldakarachi.com.pk/

Lyari Development Authority (اداره ترقیاتی لیاری) (LDA) was established in 1993 by the Government of Sindh to oversee the development of Lyari, Karachi, Sindh, Pakistan. It was merged with the City District Government Karachi in 2001 but were reinstated after its dissolution.

== See also ==
- Hawksbay Scheme-42
- Lyari Town
- Karachi Improvement Trust
- Karachi Metropolitan Corporation
- Karachi Municipal Commission
- Karachi Municipal Committee
- Karachi Municipal Corporation
- City District Government of Karachi
- Karachi Development Authority
- Malir Development Authority
