= Civic Center, Karachi =

- Karachi Civic Center
- Location within Sindh
- Location: Hasan Square Main University Road, Gulshan-e-Iqbal, Karachi, Sindh, Pakistan
- Coordinates: 24°53′56.7″N 67°4′22.8″E
- Type: Civic Center

Construction
- Built: 1979

Website
- Karachi Civic Center

Civic Center, Karachi is the civic center which is the headquarters for the Government of Karachi, Pakistan, and the office for the Mayor of Karachi is located here. Karachi Development Authority, Sindh Building Control Authority offices are also headquartered here. It is situated near Hasan Square, Gulshan-e-Iqbal on the main University Road.

Civic Center also houses Command and Control center for the Karachi police

== History ==
Civic Center, Karachi building was founded on 15 November 1979.

== See also ==
- Mayor of Karachi
- Government of Karachi
- Karachi Development Authority
- Karachi Expo Center
