= City District Government Karachi =

CDGK
- City District Government Karachi
- ولسوالی شهر حکومت کراچی
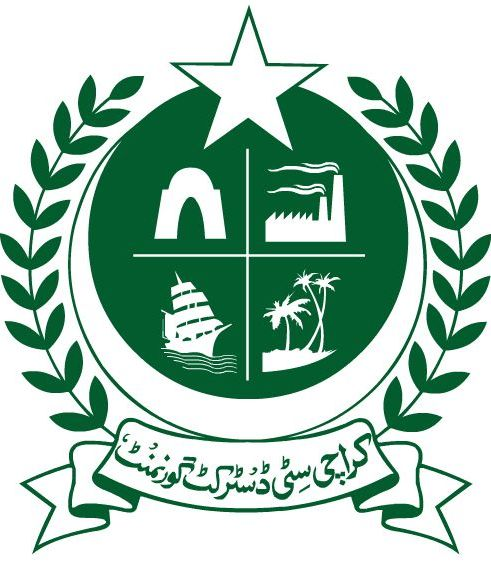
- Successor: SPLGO 2013
- Formation: 2001
- Founder: Pervez Musharraf
- Dissolved: 2010
- Legal status: Defunct
- Headquarters: Civic Center, Karachi
- Budget: Rs. 51 Billion (2009-10)
- Website: Cdgk.gov.pk (deactivated)

The City District Government Karachi (CDGK) was a local government of Karachi, Pakistan. It was established through a local government ordinance (LGO) in 2000 to empower the local government by decentralizing district government. Karachi became a federation of eighteen autonomous boroughs, called "Towns," that made up the City District Government Karachi from 2001 until 2011. Under this now-defunct system, Karachi had a local government system, with a mayor empowered to make decisions in regards to city-planning and administration of local services. It was headed by the mayor and was formed under the presidential rule of Pervez Musharraf in 2001. CDGK existed until 2010.

CDGK became a major authority in the city and was granted unprecedented power. Urban authority was emphasized and rural authority was disbanded. The CDGK was a three-tier system, with each tier having its respective nazims and naib nazims (mayors and deputy mayors), and it oversaw a major increase in development.

In 2012, the Sindh government decided that the development projects first undertaken by the CDGK would be carried out by the Karachi Metropolitan Corporation (KMC).

== Background ==
On October 12, 1999, Pervez Musharraf imposed martial law and set up the National Reconstruction Bureau (NRB) which was tasked with designing a new local government system in Pakistan. The LGO was enacted in 2000, and in 2001, Karachi Metropolitan Corporation (KMC) was accorded the status of City District Government Karachi. According to SLGO in 2001:

It is expedient to devolve political power and decentralize administrative and financial authority to accountable local governments for good governance, effective delivery of services, and transparent decision-making through institutionalized participation of the people at the grassroots level.

— Sindh Local Government Ordinance 2001 (SLGO)

For the first time in the history of Pakistan, a district government decentralized authority to the local level.

== Administration ==
City District Government Karachi (CDGK) consisted of a three-tiered setup. Tier 1 was the City council of KMC; Tier 2 was the 18 Tehsil Municipal Administrations (TMA); and Tier 3 was the 178 union councils (UCs). The previous five-district setups were merged into the single district of Karachi. The KMC under CDGK had 255 members elected through popular elections of the UCs. The heads of these UCs then elected their mayor and deputy mayor.

former 18 Towns of CDGK in 2001

- Baldia Town (West)
- Bin Qasim Town (Malir)
- Gadap Town (Malir)
- Gulberg Town (Central)
- Gulshan Town (East)
- Jamshed Town (South)
- Keamari Town (West)
- Korangi Town (East)
- Landhi Town (East)
- Liaquatabad Town (Central)
- Lyari Town (West)
- Malir Town (Malir)
- New Karachi Town (Central)
- North Nazimabad Town (Central)
- Orangi Town (West)
- Saddar Town (South)
- Shah Faisal Town (East)
- SITE Town (West)

Each Town's Union Council was the primary governmental institution in Pakistan. Headed by a Union Nazim, each union council had 13 elected members or councilors. In addition to four male and two female members elected directly, there were two male and two female representatives of the labor, a minority member, a Union Nazim and his deputy known as Union Naib Nazim. Beside elected members, there were several government employees and functionaries in every union council, who report to the Secretary of the Union Council. The latter was a civil servant appointed by the state. The territory of a Union Council or Village Council was usually part of a Tehsil (county). Less commonly, a Union Council may be part of a City District.

Union Councils of Karachi

The following is the list of union councils of Karachi. Karachi had a total of 18 Towns, and 178 Union councils.

Baldia Town

U.C. # 1 Gulshan-e-Ghazi U.C. # 2 Ittehad Town U.C. # 3 Islam Nagar U.C. # 4 Nai Abadi U.C. # 5 Saeedabad U.C. # 6 Muslim Mujahid Colony U.C. # 7 Muhajir Camp U.C. # 8 Rasheedabad

Bin Qasim Town

U.C. # 1 Ibrahim Hyderi U.C. # 2 Rehri U.C. # 3 Cattle Colony U.C. # 4 Qaidabad U.C. # 5 Landhi Colony U.C. # 6 Gulshan-e-Hadeed U.C. # 7 Gaghar

Gadap Town

U.C. # 1 Murad Memon Goth U.C. # 2 Darsano Chana U.C. # 3 Gadap U.C. # 4 Gujro U.C. # 5 Songal U.C. # 6 Maymarabad U.C. # 7 Yousuf Goth U.C. # 8 Manghopir

Gulberg Town

U.C. # 1 Azizabad U.C. # 2 Karimabad U.C. # 3 Aisha Manzil U.C. # 4 Ancholi U.C. # 5 Naseerabad U.C. # 6 Yaseenabad U.C. # 7 Water Pump U.C. # 8 Shafiq Mill Colony

Gulshan Town

U.C. # 1 Delhi Mercantile Society U.C. # 2 Civic Centre U.C. # 3 Pir Ilahi Buksh Colony U.C. # 4 Essa Nagri U.C. # 5 Gulshan-e-Iqbal U.C. # 6 Gillani Railway Station U.C. # 7 Shanti Nagar U.C. # 8 Jamali Colony U.C. # 9 Gulshan-e-Iqbal II U.C. # 10 Pehlwan Goth U.C. # 11 Matrovil Colony U.C. # 12 Gulzar-e-Hijri U.C. # 13 Safooran Goth

Jamshed Town

U.C. # 1 Akhtar Colony U.C. # 2 Manzoor Colony U.C. # 3 Azam Basti U.C. # 4 Chanesar Goth U.C. # 5 Mahmudabad U.C. # 6 P.E.C.H.S. (Pakistan Employees Co-operative Housing Society) U.C. # 7 P.E.C.H.S. II U.C. # 8 Jut Line U.C. # 9 Central Jacob Lines U.C. # 10 Jamshed Quarters U.C. # 11 Garden East U.C. # 12 Soldier Bazar U.C. # 13 Pakistan Quarters

Keamari Town

U.C. # 1 Bhutta Village U.C. # 2 Sultanabad U.C. # 3 Kiamari U.C. # 4 Baba Bhit U.C. # 5 Machar Colony U.C. # 6 Maripur U.C. # 7 SherShah U.C. # 8 Gabo Pat

Korangi Town

U.C. # 1 Bilal Colony U.C. # 2 Nasir Colony U.C. # 3 Chakra Goth U.C. # 4 Mustafa Taj Colony U.C. # 5 Hundred Quarters U.C. # 6 Gulzar Colony U.C. # 7 Korangi Sector 33 U.C. # 8 Zaman Town U.C. # 9 Hasrat Mohani Colony

Landhi Town

U.C. # 1 Muzafarabad U.C. # 2 Muslimabad U.C. # 3 Dawood Chowrangi U.C. # 4 Moinabad U.C. # 5 Sharafi Goth U.C. # 6 Bhutto Nagar U.C. # 7 Khawaja Ajmeer Colony U.C. # 8 Landhi U.C. # 9 Awami Colony U.C. # 10 Burmee Colony U.C. # 11 Korangi U.C. # 12 Sherabad

Liaquatabad Town

U.C. # 1 Rizvia Society (R.C.H.S.) (Rizvia Co-operative Housing Society) U.C. # 2 Firdous Colony U.C. # 3 Super Market U.C. # 4 Dak Khana U.C. # 5 Qasimabad U.C. # 6 Bandhani Colony U.C. # 7 Sharifabad U.C. # 8 Commercial Area U.C. # 9 Mujahid Colony U.C. # 10 Nazimabad U.C. # 11 Abbasi Shaheed

Lyari Town

U.C. # 1 Agra Taj Colony U.C. # 2 Daryaabad U.C. # 3 Nawabad U.C. # 4 Khada Memon Society U.C. # 5 Baghdadi U.C. # 6 Shah Baig Line U.C. # 7 Bihar Colony U.C. # 8 Ragiwara U.C. # 9 Singo Line U.C. # 10 Chakiwara U.C. # 11 Allama Iqbal Colony

Malir Town

U.C. # 1 Model Colony U.C. # 2 Kala Board U.C. # 3 Saudabad U.C. # 4 Khokhra Par U.C. # 5 Jafar-e-Tayyar U.C. # 6 Gharibabad U.C. # 7 Ghazi Brohi Goth

New Karachi Town

U.C. # 1 Kalyana U.C. # 2 Sir Syed Colony U.C. # 3 Fatima Jinnah Colony U.C. # 4 Godhra U.C. # 5 Abu Zar Ghaffari U.C. # 6 Hakim Ahsan U.C. # 7 Madina Colony U.C. # 8 Faisal Colony U.C. # 9 Khamiso Goth U.C. # 10 Mustufa Colony U.C. # 11 Khawaja Ajmeer Nagri U.C. # 12 Gulshan-e-Saeed U.C. # 13 Shah Nawaz Bhutto Colony

North Nazimabad Town

U.C. # 1 Paposh Nagar U.C. # 2 Pahar Ganj U.C. # 3 Khandu Goth U.C. # 4 Hyderi U.C. # 5 Sakhi Hassan U.C. # 6 Farooq-e-Azam U.C. # 7 Nusrat Bhutto Colony U.C. # 8 Shadman Town U.C. # 9 Buffer Zone U.C. # 10 Buffer Zone II

Orangi Town

U.C. # 1 Mominabad U.C. # 2 Haryana Colony U.C. # 3 Hanifabad U.C. # 4 Mohammad Nagar U.C. # 5 Madina Colony U.C. # 6 Ghaziabad U.C. # 7 Chisti Nagar U.C. # 8 Bilal Colony U.C. # 9 Iqbal Baloch Colony U.C. # 10 Ghabool Town U.C. # 11 Data Nagar U.C. # 12 Mujahidabad U.C. # 13 Baloch Goth

Saddar Town

U.C. # 1 Old Haji Camp U.C. # 2 Garden U.C. # 3 Kharadar U.C. # 4 City Railway Colony U.C. # 5 Nanak Wara U.C. # 6 Gazdarabad U.C. # 7 Millat Nagar/Islam Pura U.C. # 8 Saddar U.C. # 9 Civil Line U.C. # 10 Clifton U.C. # 11 Kehkashan

Shah Faisal Town

U.C. # 1 Natha Khan Goth U.C. # 2 Pak Sadat Colony U.C. # 3 Drigh Colony U.C. # 4 Raita Plot U.C. # 5 Moria Khan Goth U.C. # 6 Rafa-e-Aam Society U.C. # 7 Al-Falah Society

SITE Town (Sindh Industrial & Trading Estate) U.C. # 1 Pak Colony U.C. # 2 Old Golimar U.C. # 3 Jahanabad U.C. # 4 Metrovil U.C. # 5 Bhawani Chali U.C. # 6 Frontier Colony U.C. # 7 Banaras Colony U.C. # 8 Qasba Colony U.C. # 9 Islamia Colony

== Authority ==
The mayor controlled a large number of municipal powers and portfolios and his responsibilities included, but were not limited to:

...intra-city or intra-town or Taluka network of water supply, sanitation, conservancy, removal and disposal of sullage, refuse, garbage, sewer or stormwater, solid or liquid waste, drainage, public toilets, expressways bridges, flyovers, public roads, streets, footpaths, traffic signals, pavements and lighting thereof, public parks, gardens, arboriculture, landscaping, billboards, hoardings, firefighting, land use control, zoning, master planning, classification, declassification or reclassification of commercial or residential areas, markets, housing, urban or rural infrastructure, environment and construction, maintenance or development thereof and enforcement of any law or rule relating thereto

— Sindh Local Government Ordinance, 2001

The Mayor held one-third of the land control of Karachi. The rest was under the control of other bodies including the Government of Sindh—the federal government that had strong institutional presence independent of the district government—the CAA, railways, Cantonments), steel mills and the Karachi port trust, which each had their own regulations despite being required to coordinate with CDGK.

== Initiatives ==
=== Traffic Wardens ===
Due to a lack of traffic police and the need to manage the traffic of the city, the mayors introduced 1,575 traffic wardens. The system was dissolved when the 2001 LGO was scrapped by Sindh government.

=== Urban Transport System (UTS) / CNG Green Bus ===
The first city government under Naimatullah Khan allowed the private sector to purchase imported, wide-bodied Compressed natural gas (CNG) buses. The purchase was given a subsidy of 6%, a federal government waiver on import duty and sales tax, and a 70% loan markup financed by the banks.

According to the plan, the city needed 8,000 buses to replace aging, pollutant vehicles and improve Karachi's public transport infrastructure. Initially, 300-350 buses were purchased, but 40% of the vehicles ended up in other locations.

A pilot project was initiated during the tenure of Mustafa Kamal. High operating costs (caused by the high diesel price and unavailability of compressed natural gas), insufficient revenue, lack of funding by the city government after two years, failure to maintain the buses, and inability to secure a loan contributed to the failure of the project. Only 12 buses from this project remain operable, mainly on Shahrah-e-Faisal.

There have been calls for the revival of CDGK.

== Departments ==
Various departments were transferred to the KMC to streamline the local body system.:

- Karachi Water and Sewerage Board (KW&SB)
- Karachi Development Authority (KDA)
- Malir Development Authority (MDA)
- Lyari Development Authority (LDA)
- Master Plan
- Karachi Mass transit Cell (KMTC)
- Karachi Solid Waste Management (KSWM)
- Traffic Engineering Bureau (part of KDA)
- Karachi Urban Transport Corporation (KUTC) (A federal body with CDGK's 15% stake)
- Karachi Building Control Authority (KBCA)
- Land Registry Department
- Land Revenue Department

== See also ==
- Mayor of Karachi
