= Mehran Town =

Neighbourhood in Karachi

Coordinates: 31°41′N 74°17′E

Mehran Town (Urdu: مہران ٹاؤن) is located in Korangi Industrial Area in Karachi, Sindh, Pakistan. Mehran Town is spread over an area of around 1,150 acres and consists of 9 sectors 6-A to 6-I and has a population of around 0.2 million.

The locality has a mixed ethnic culture, where communities speaking Urdu, Sindhi, Pushto, Saraiki and Hindko co-exist. Mehran Town (sharif abad which has illegally captured and formed on mehran town sector 6-D by local political influences as the mehran town Sector 6-C, is a part of Union Council (UC) 37, Korangi Town and is situated near Bilal Colony (UC) 32 And Korangi Industrial area sector 7-A ( pakistan's Largest leather raw material and finished goods hub) . It has Malir River in its North-West and National Refinery (pakistan's largest oil refining complex) on its East.

== Controversy ==
Merhran Town was announced in 1973 by Karachi Development Authority (KDA). Payments were made in advance but basic utilities including water, electricity and gas were not provided in the housing project by KDA. Eventually, large areas of Mehran Town were encroached on and illegally possessed by land grabbers with the support from local politicians. Most of the construction in this part of the city is single-storied and cemented tiles have been used for the construction of roofs.

Sector 6-C was initially planned for establishing industries in the area, however, nearly 200 residential units have also been illegally constructed there. Cottage industries have also been established on a few vacant plots. Sector 6-D is supposed to have 378 units but, in actuality, thousands of housing units exist here.

=== Lack of Basic Amenities ===
The haphazard construction has naturally led to a number of problems. Majority of the residents are living without any basic civic facilities. The sewerage system in some areas is on the verge of collapse, and in other areas, almost non-existent. Land mafia has dug up earth from empty plots, leaving behind huge pits which now turns into a massive pools of wastewater during rainy season. Only a few houses have a proper electric setup and the majority of the inhabitants have taken connections of electricity through illegal cables (Kunda system). A great number of consumers have to rely on bamboo poles to bring power lines to their homes since electricity poles have not been installed.

A majority of inhabitants don’t have access to legal water supply lines and get water either through water tankers or illegal supply lines. Moreover, only 50 per cent of the population has access to gas supply. The remaining population depends on gas cylinders for cooking and other purposes.

The locality also lacks a garbage lifting system as garbage can be observed scattered around in the area. There is no school or dispensary in the area. The children of the town go to Bilal Colony and other areas for getting education. Likewise, the patients are also taken to Bilal Colony for treatment. The locality does have some markets where grocery and other items of daily items are available.

=== Political Influence ===
The residents of the area have, reportedly, complained of red-tape. Whenever they approach a civic authority for a resolution to their problems, they are referred to a different authority. Local politicians have also been accused of collusion where in sector 6-C a majority of the plots are said to have been encroached by land grabbers supported by the former government of Pakistan People Party. Police staff and officials from the local Sharifabad Police Station has also been accused of willful negligence and corruption where they, reportedly, back encroachers and do not take any action on the matter.

== See also ==
- Korangi
- Korangi Town
- Korangi Creek Cantonment
- Korangi Creek Industrial Park
