= Karachi Municipal Commission =

Government office in Pakistan

Karachi Municipal Commission (KMC) was a public corporation established in 1852 in Karachi, Sindh. Pakistan.

== History ==
Karachi Conservancy Board was established to control Cholera epidemic in Karachi during British rule in 1846. The board was upgraded into Municipal Commission in 1852. In 1853 Municipal Commission was turned into Karachi Municipal Committee. The foundation stone of KMC building was laid on Bundar Road in 1927.

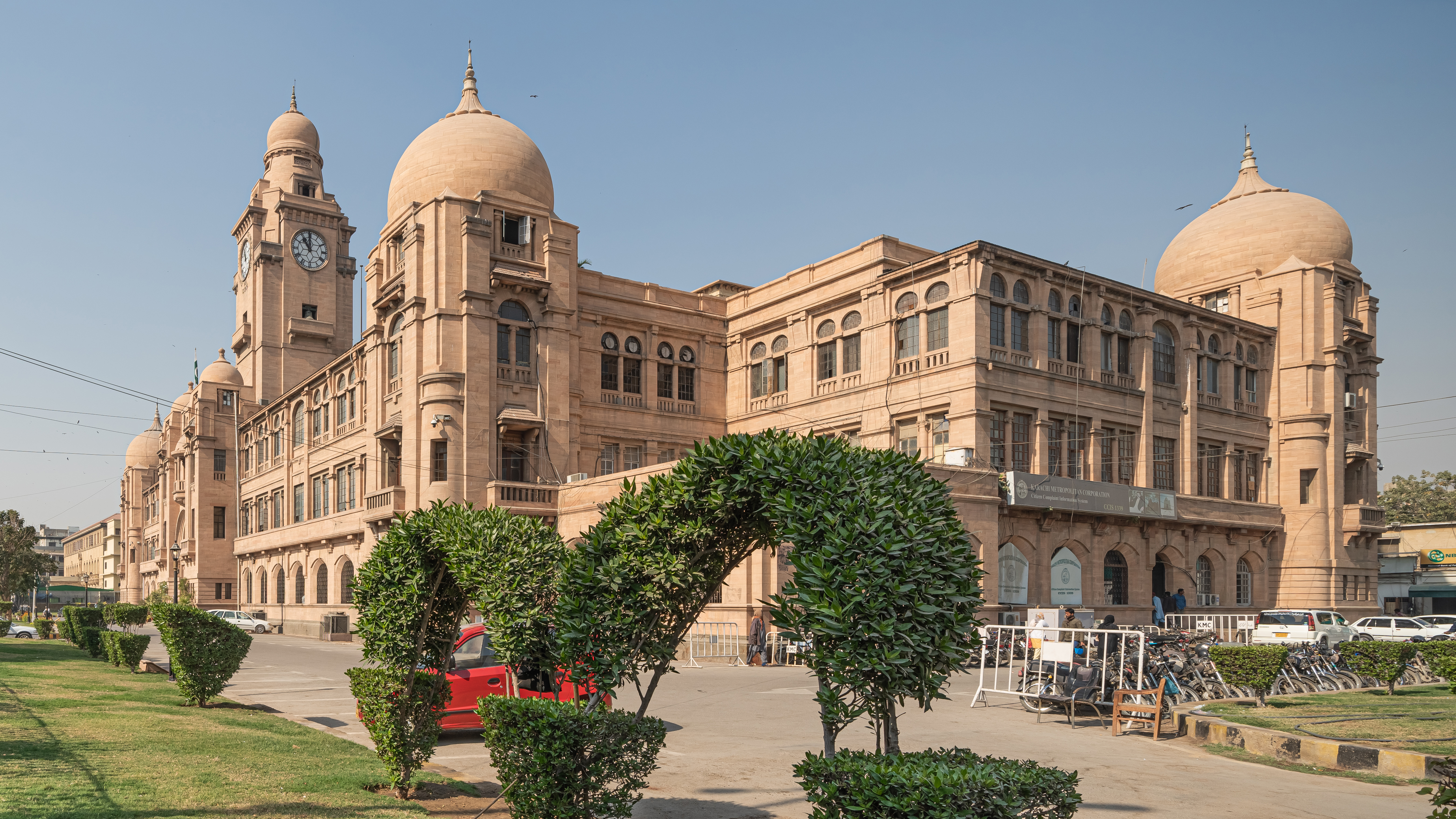
KMC Building has evolved an iconic status as one of the landmark structures of Karachi

In 1933 Karachi Municipal Committee was upgraded to Karachi Municipal Corporation by Karachi Municipal Act. Karachi Municipal Corporation was turned in Karachi Metropolitan Corporation in 1976.

Zonal Municipal Committees were established in 1987. The zonal committees were merged again in KMC. Five District Municipal Corporations (DMC) were established in 1987. The KMC was abolished in 2000 and 5 DMC's were merged in City District Karachi. The City District Karachi was divided in 18 Towns and 178 union councils. In 2011 Sindh Government restored again Karachi Metropolitan Corporation (KMC) and 5 District Municipal Corporations (DMC).

== See also ==
- Karachi Metropolitan Corporation
- Karachi Development Authority
