= Sobhraj Maternity Hospital =

Hospital in Karachi, Pakistan

Geography
- Location: Karachi, Sindh, Pakistan, Pakistan
- Coordinates: 24°51′28″N 67°00′58″E

Organisation
- Care system: Public
- Patron: Karachi Metropolitan Corporation

History
- Opened: 1928

Links
- Lists: Hospitals in Pakistan

Sobhraj Maternity Hospital (SMH) is a hospital in Karachi, Pakistan. It is the second oldest hospital in Karachi and the city's oldest maternity hospital.

It is under the administration of the Karachi Metropolitan Corporation.

== History ==
It was established in 1928 by Chetumal Sobhraj in honor of his wife, Kishen Devi Sobhraj, and initially served as a women's welfare health unit.

In 1975, the hospital expanded with the addition of a three-story block in its private wing, and in 1979, the mother and child center was upgraded to a maternity home. That same year, the Royal College of Obstetricians and Gynaecologists recognized SMH for postgraduate teaching. The College of Physicians and Surgeons accredited the hospital in 1987.

In 1991, SMH established a nursing school for midwife education and training, and the institution was further elevated to maternity hospital status in 2001.
