= Planning & Development Department (Sindh) =

Sindh government department

The Planning and Development Department is a department of the Government of Sindh.

The Planning and Development Department has various wings, including the Monitoring and Evaluation Cell, the Bureau of Statistics, and the Research and Training Wing. The department also manages over 100 specialized projects across Sindh.

== Sections of the Planning & Development Department ==
Sections of P&D Department
Administrative Sections	Technical Sections	Economic Sections
General	Transport & Communication	Economic
Admin-I	Water & Drainage	Foreign Aid
Admin-II	Physical Planning & Housing	Coordination
Coordination	Health	Development
Legal	Education	Social Sector
Foreign Tratining	Livestock & Fishiries	CPEC Unit
	Agriculture	
	Science & Technology	
	Environment & Climate Change	
	Industries & Energy	
	Sports, Culture & Tourism	

== List of Additional Chief Secretaries ==
List of all individuals who served as the Additional Chief Secretaries (now abolished) of the P&D Department:

Name of Additional Chief Secretary	Entered Office	Left Office
Mr. Nusrat Hassan	01-07-1970	01-01-1971
Mr. Aftab Ahmed Khan	02-01-1971	01-03-1972
Mr. Badruddin Zahidi	01-03-1972	09-04-1975
Mr. R.A. Akhund	10-04-1975	22-10-1983
Mr. S.G. Murtaza Shah	03-11-1983	02-01-1985
Mr. A.B. Soomro	02-01-1985	27-11-1989
Mr. Salahuddin	10-12-1989	28-12-1989
Mr. Fazlullah Qureshi	28-12-1989	01-03-1994
Mr. Mirza Qamar Baig	02-03-1994	13-01-1996
Mr. Jiwan Khan	14-01-1996	07-11-1996
Mr. Salik Nazir Ahmed	16-11-1996	02-12-1998
Mr. Muhammad Javed Ashraf Hussain	03-12-1998	09-10-1999
Dr. Mutawakkil Kazi	19-11-1999	20-12-2000
Mr. Shahzado Shaikh	12-01-2001	10-01-2003
Mr. Ghulam Sarwar Khero	13-01-2003	21-02-2008
Mr. Nazar Hussain Mahar	21-02-2008	26-09-2009
Mr. Munawar Opel	28-09-2009	10-02-2010
Mr. Muhammad Siddique Memon	20-07-2010	22-09-2010
Mr. Muhammad Ishaque Lashari	22-09-2010	25-08-2011
Mr. Malik Asrar Hussain	25-08-2011	07-02-2013
Mr. Arif Ahmed Khan	07-02-2013	31-01-2014
Mr. Muhammad Waseem	02-02-2014	21-08-2015
Mr. Aijaz Ali Khan	24-08-2015	22-02-2016
Mr. Muhammad Waseem	23-02-2016	12-01-2017

== List of Chairpersons ==
List of all individuals who served as Chairperson of the P&D Board:

NAME	Entered office	Left office
Mr. Muhammad Waseem (Grade-22)	January 13, 2017	April 26, 2019
Ms. Naheed Shah Durrani (Grade-22)	April 29, 2019	January 2, 2020
Mr. Muhammad Waseem (Grade-22)	January 3, 2020	till date -

== History ==
Previously, the post of Chairman of the Planning and Development Board was referred to as Additional Chief Secretary for Planning and Development. However, as the department and its board expanded, the post was abolished and replaced with the position of Chairman P&D.

== See also ==
- Government of Sindh
- Chief Secretary of Sindh
- Grade-22
