= Karachi Conservancy Board =

The Karachi Conservancy Board was established in 1846 to control cholera epidemics in Karachi during British rule.

The board was upgraded into a Municipal Commission in 1852. In 1853 the Municipal Commission was turned into the Karachi Municipal Committee. The foundation stone of the KMC building was laid on Bundar road in 1927.

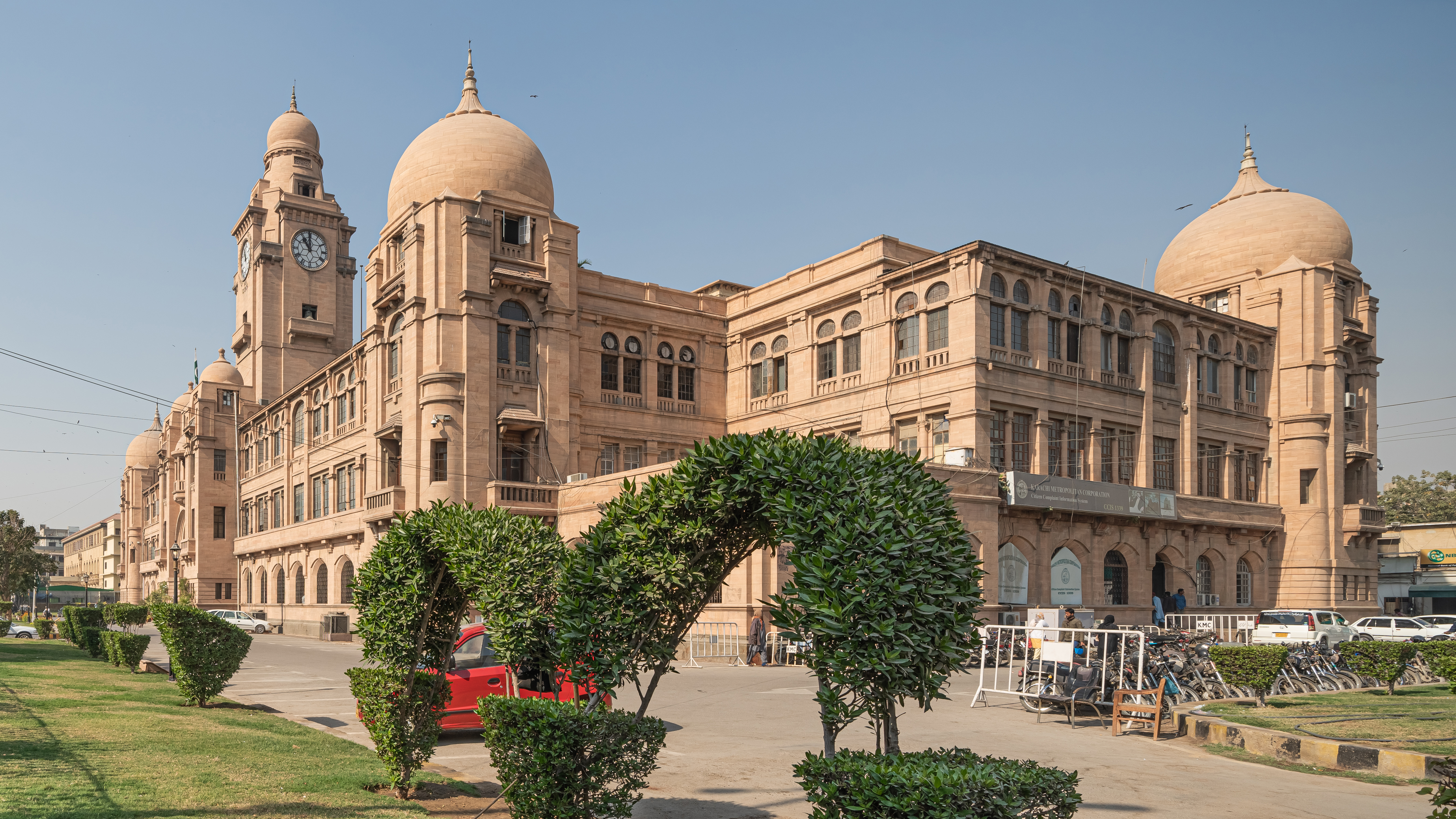
The KMC building is one of the landmark structures of Karachi

In 1933 the Karachi Municipal Committee was upgraded to the Karachi Municipal Corporation by the Karachi Municipal Act. The Karachi Municipal Corporation became the Karachi Metropolitan Corporation in 1976.

Zonal Municipal Committees were established in 1987. The zonal committees were merged again in KMC. Five District Municipal Corporations were established in 1987. The KMC was abolished in 2000 and five DMCs were merged in the City District of Karachi. The City District of Karachi was divided into 18 towns and 178 union councils. In 2011 the Sindh Government restored the Karachi Metropolitan Corporation and five District Municipal Corporations.
