= Karachi Municipal Committee =

Karachi Municipal Committee (هيئت شہرداری کراچی) was a public corporation established in 1853 in Karachi, Bombay Presidency (now Sindh, Pakistan).

== History ==
The Karachi Conservancy Board was established to control cholera epidemics in Karachi during British rule in 1846. The board was upgraded to the Municipal Commission in 1852. In 1853 the Municipal Commission was turned into the Karachi Municipal Committee. The foundation stone of the Karachi Municipal Corporation Building was laid on Bundar Road in 1927.

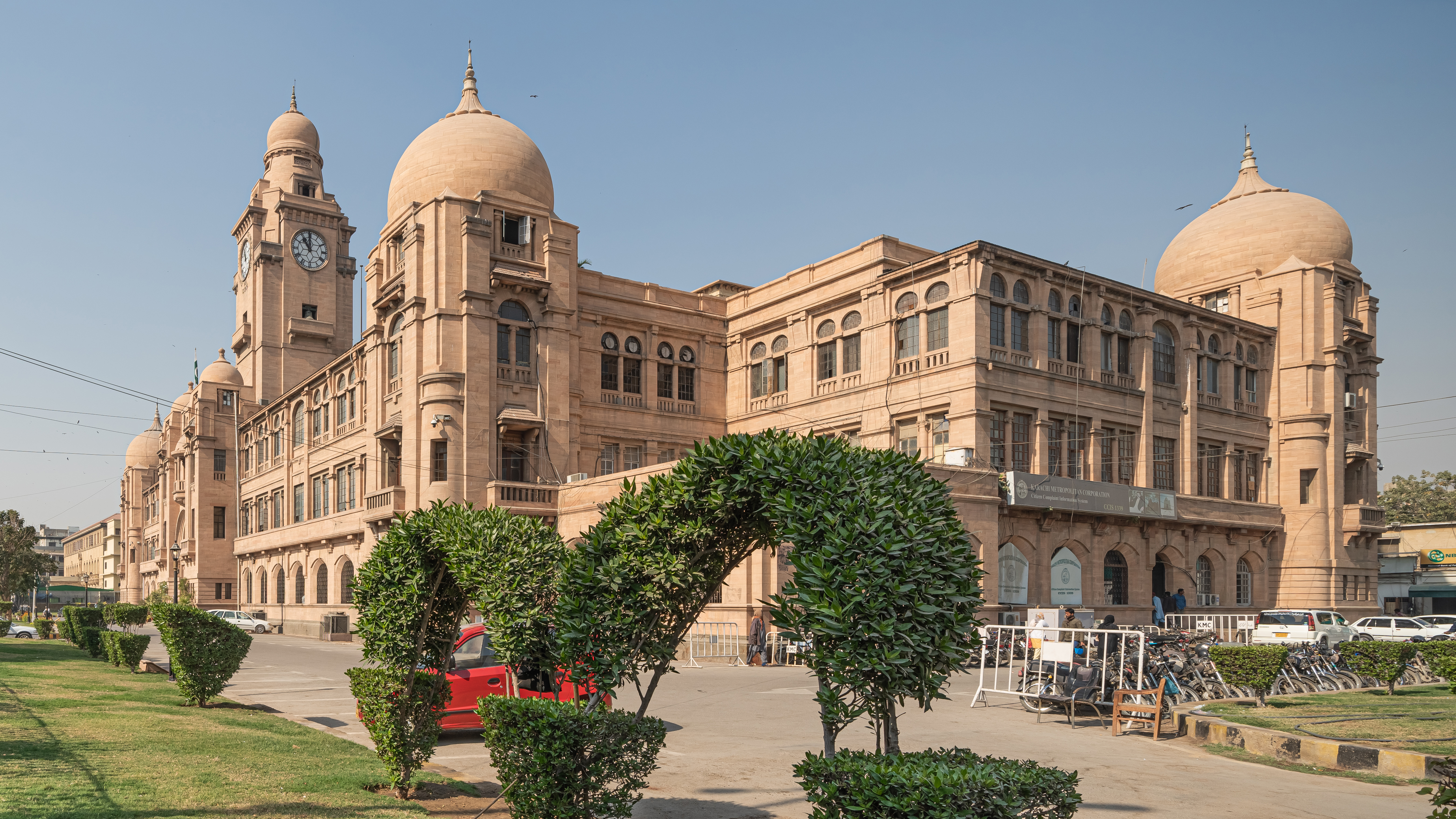
KMC Building has gained an iconic status as one of the landmark structures of Karachi

In 1933 the Karachi Municipal Committee was upgraded to the Karachi Municipal Corporation by the Karachi Municipal Act. The Karachi Municipal Corporation was turned into the Karachi Metropolitan Corporation in 1976.

Zonal municipal committees were established in 1987. The zonal committees were merged again into the Karachi Metropolitan Corporation. Five district municipal corporations were established in 1987. The Karachi Metropolitan Corporation was abolished in 2000 and five district municipal corporations were merged into City District Karachi. The City District Karachi was divided into 18 town and 178 union councils. In 2011 the Sindh Government restored the Karachi Metropolitan Corporation and five district municipal corporations.

== See also ==
- Karachi Metropolitan Corporation
- Karachi Development Authority
