= Nishtar Road =

Major road of Karachi, Pakistan

Nishtar Road or Nishter Road is one of the major roads in Karachi, Pakistan. It runs from Jehangir Road to Chakiwara Road. Encyclopedia Britannica describes it as one of four the west-to-east arterial roads of the city.

During the colonial era the road was named Lawrence Road, possibly for Sir John Lawrence, Viceroy and Governor-General of India.

The subsequent independence movement of what is now modern day Pakistan led to the road being named after Abdur Rab Nishtar.

In the early 19th century, Karachi's small Jewish community settled along Lawrence Road.

In 2015 the Karachi Metropolitan Corporation anti-encroachment department removed all pushcarts, roadside cabins, shops, counters and other encroachments from Nishtar Road because they were restricting the flow of traffic.
