= Karachi Metropolitan Corporation Building =

Coordinates: 24°51′19.4″N 67°00′27.8″E

KMC Building
- عمارت عظمیٰ کلان‌شہر کراچی
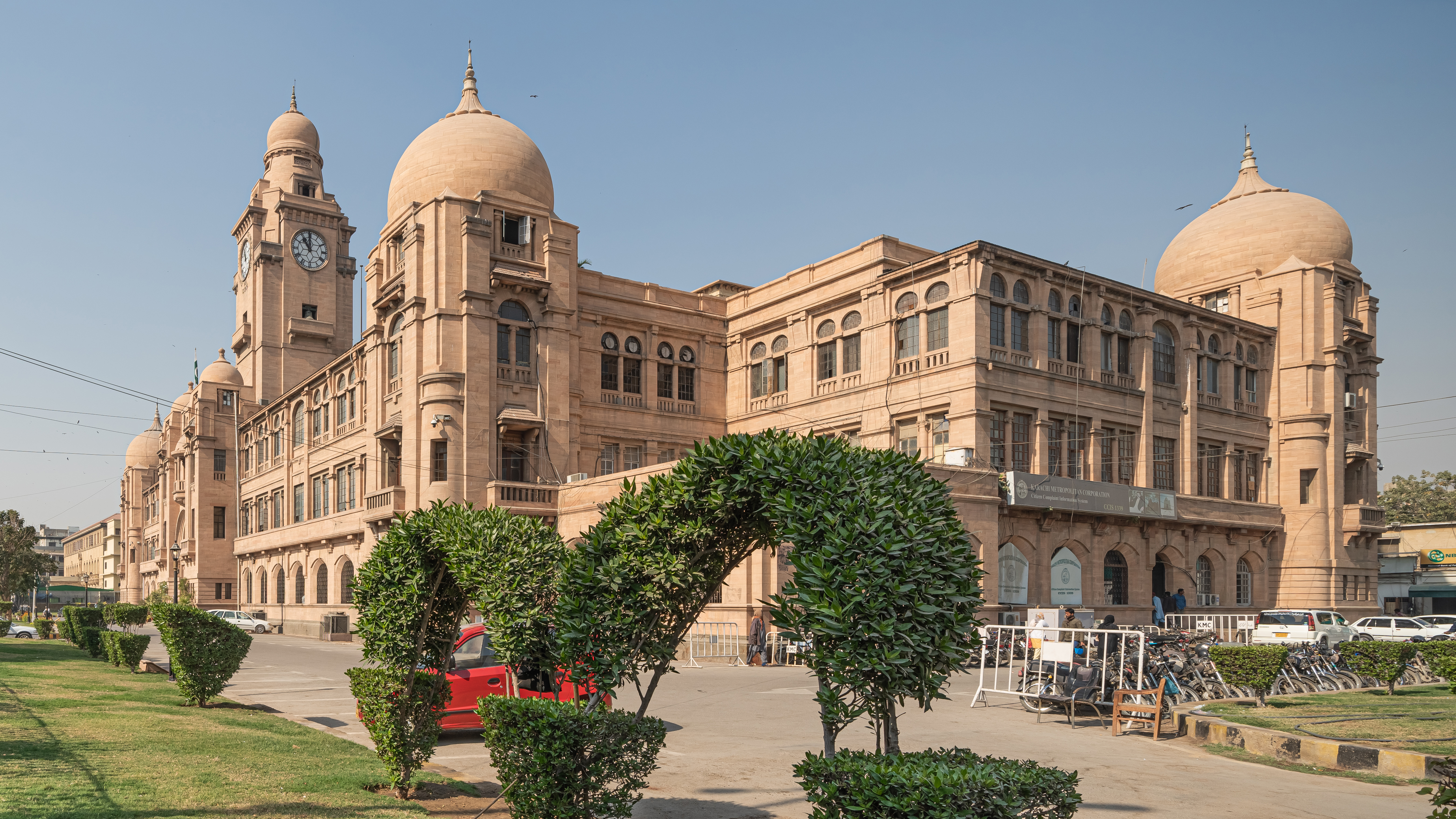

General information
- Type: Municipal building
- Architectural style: Art Deco, Anglo-Mughal
- Location: Karachi, Pakistan, Pakistan
- Current tenants: Karachi Metropolitan Corporation
- Construction started: 5 November 1927
- Completed: 31 December 1930
- Inaugurated: 1932
- Owner: Karachi Metropolitan Corporation, Government of Sindh

Technical details
- Material: Gizri sandstone

Design and construction
- Architect: James S.C. Wynnes
- Engineer: Measham Lea
- Civil engineer: Jehangir N. Setna

The Karachi Metropolitan Corporation (KMC) Building is a colonial-era building located on M. A. Jinnah Road, in central Karachi. Construction began in 1927, completed in 1930, and the building was then inaugurated in 1932. It is considered to be one of the most architecturally significant buildings in Karachi.

== History ==
A foundation stone for a new municipal office was first laid at the site in 1895. Groundwork for was completed in 1915, but the remainder of construction did not begin until 1927. Construction was completed in 1930, and the building was inaugurated in 1932, as the Karachi Municipal Building. The total cost of the building was Rs.1,775,000.

The building's Silver Jubilee Clock, a clock tower with a Moorish-style dome, was added in 1935 to commemorate King George V's visit to the region.

In January 2007, Karachi celebrated the 75th anniversary of the building. The building went through a major renovation project which included repairing of the clock tower.

On 31 August 2021, Karachi Administrator issued orders to fix the colonial British-era Silver Jubilee Clock.

== Architecture ==
=== Building ===
The building was designed by James S.C. Wynnes, a Scottish architect from Edinburgh. The building is mostly of an Anglo-Mughal style that blends native and colonial styles, and also contains Egyptian and Spanish motifs. Construction used Jodhpur sandstone for the facade, while local yellow Gizri sandstone was used to wrap the rest of the building.

=== Clock tower ===
The building's Silver Jubilee Clock and clock tower were added in 1935, and built with neo-Moorish and colonial motifs. The clock has the words 'H M King George V, Silver Jubilee Clock 1935' along its outer perimeter.

== Municipal functions ==
The historic and iconic Karachi Metropolitan Corporation Building houses the mayor's and deputy mayor's office, as well as the City Council (which has 304 members, all of whom are union committee chairmen). Due to an increased number of members of Karachi's municipal government, and a shortage of space, the City Council passed a resolution for new City Council Building to be built in order to accommodate the required members on 3 October 2016.

== Gallery ==
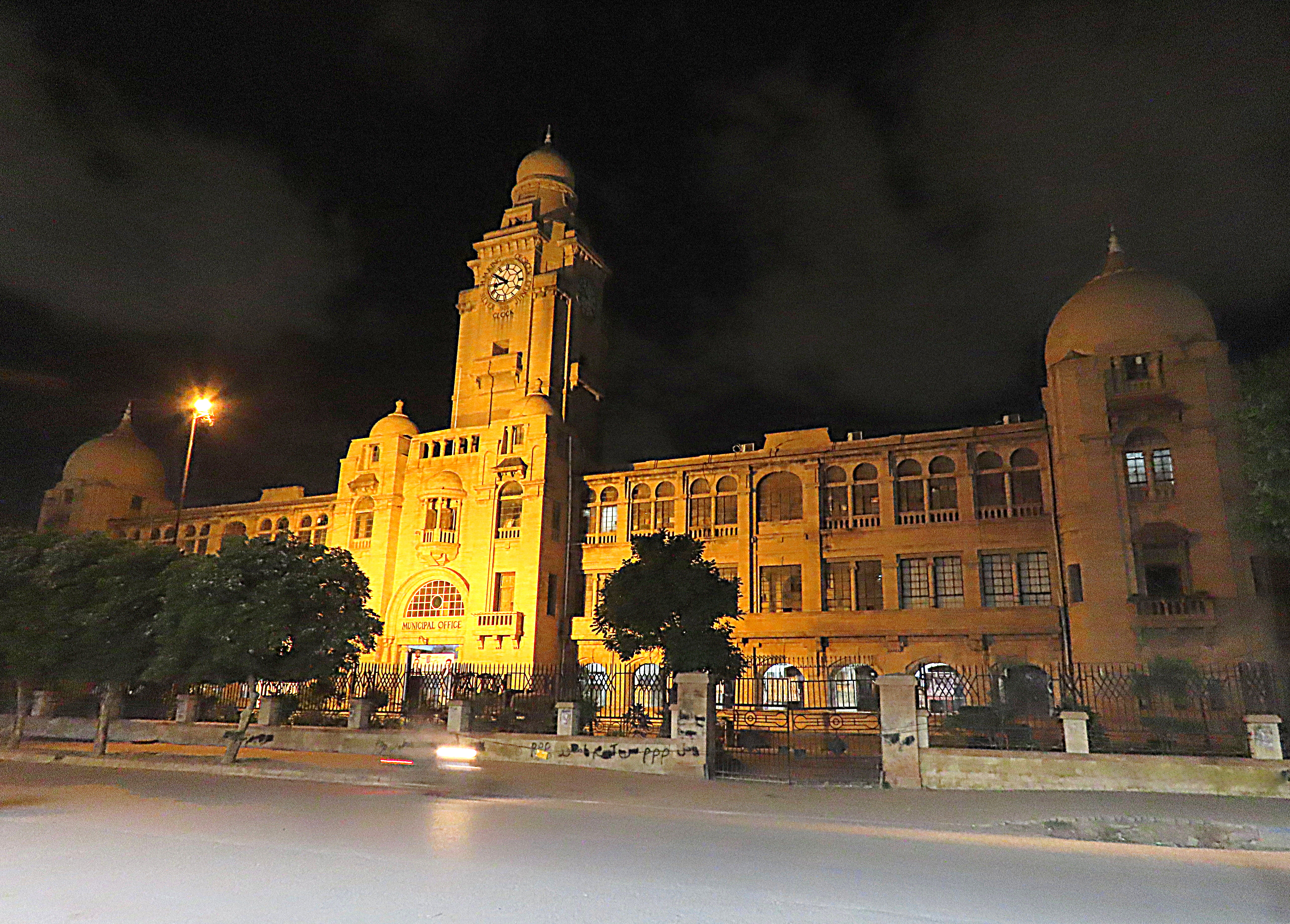
KMC Building at night

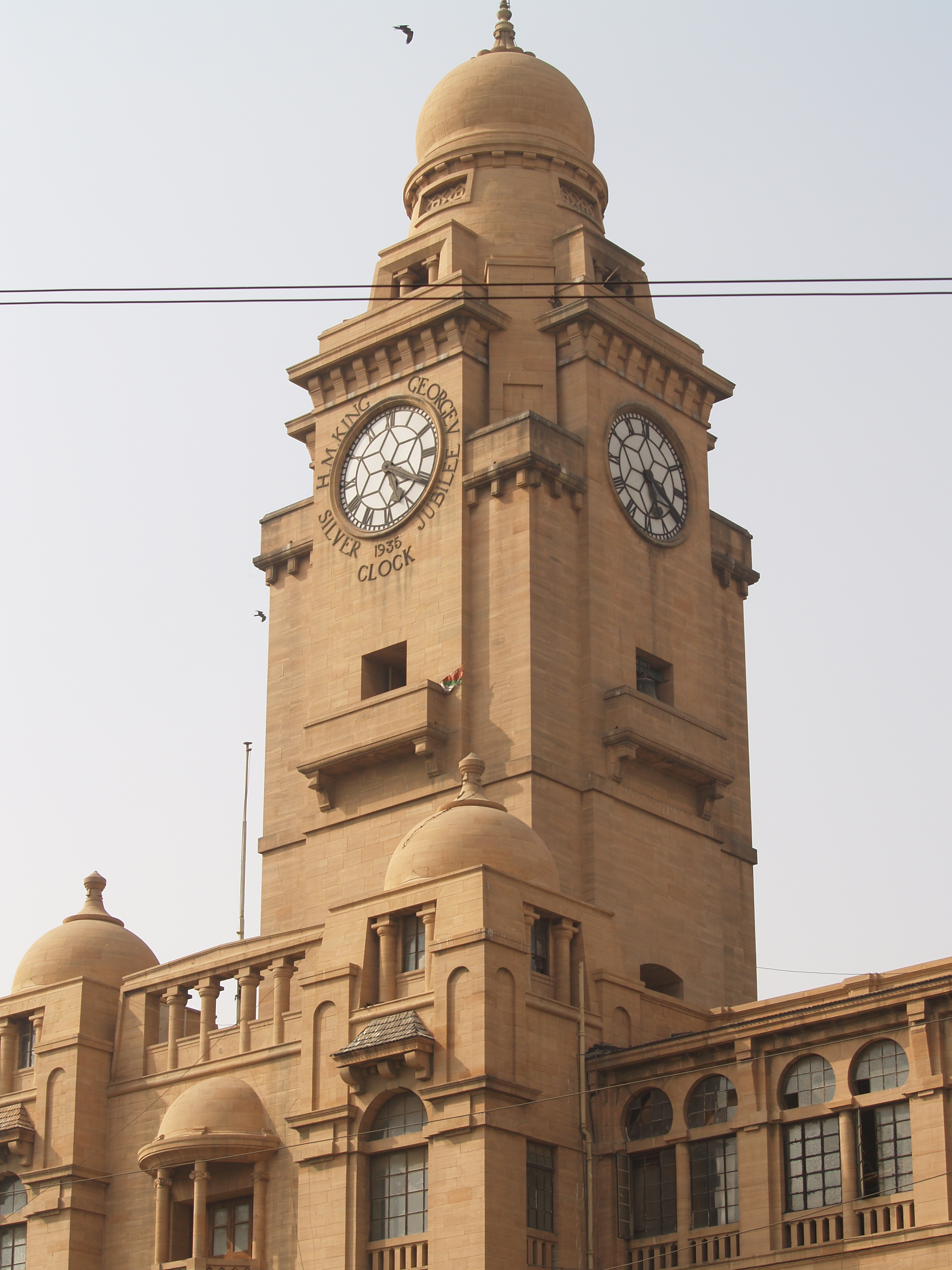
The Silver Jubilee Clock was added in 1935 to commemorate the visit of King George V to British India.

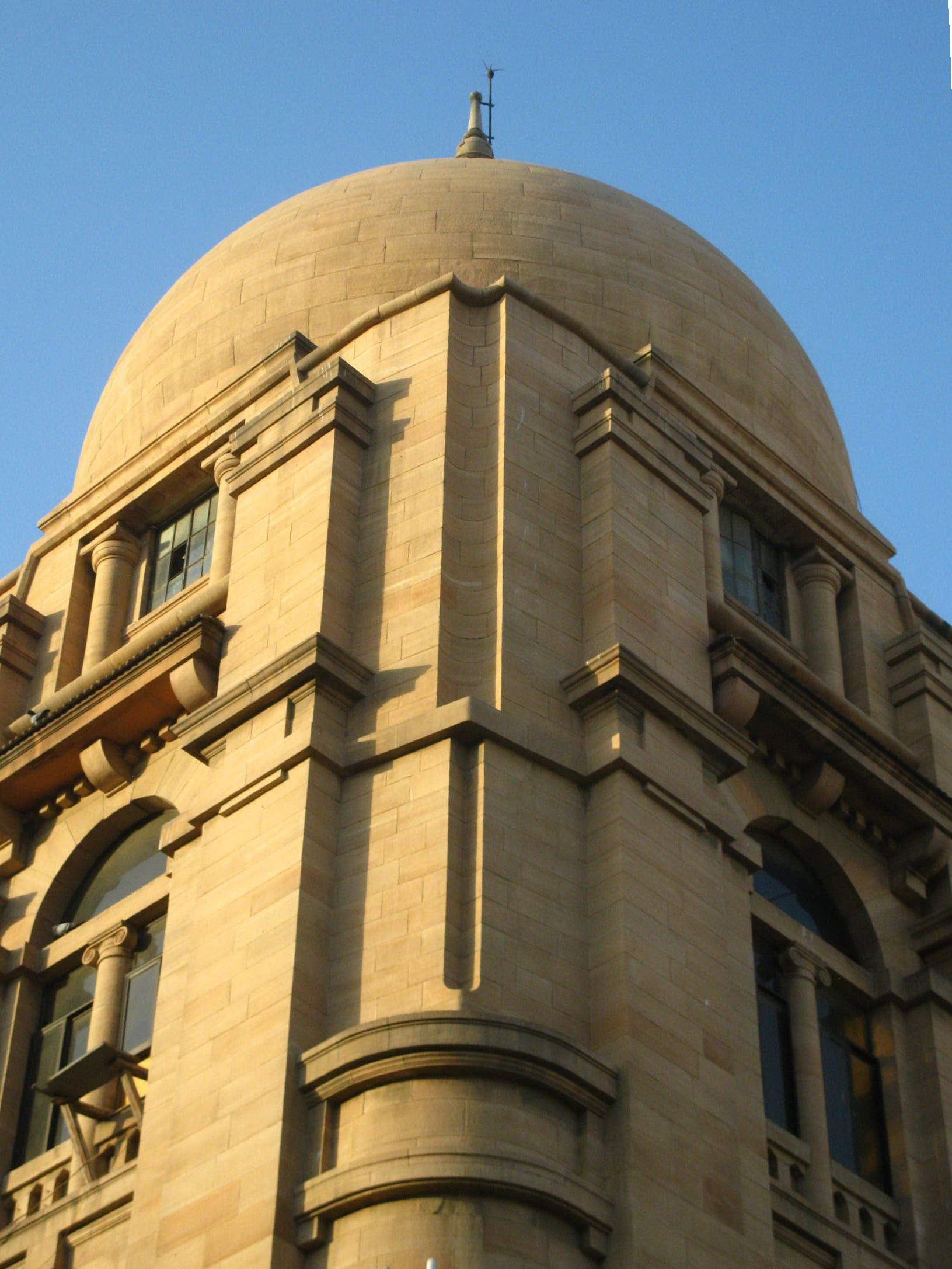
The building's style is a mix of European and Islamic motifs.

== In popular culture ==
In Jindo by Green Entertainment, the Karachi Municipal Corporation Building represents the seat of power for the tyrant landlord Daad Saein. This iconic structure serves as a visual metaphor, accentuating the character's authoritative presence in the Pakistani drama serial.
