= Commissioner Karachi =

Position in the Government of Sindh

Commissioner Karachi Division
- Seal of Sindh

- Provincial Flag of Sindh
- Incumbent; Syed Hassan Naqvi since 9 April 2024
- Abbreviation: CK
- Reports to: Chief Minister; Chief Secretary
- Residence: Commissioner House, Karachi
- Seat: Karachi
- Appointer: Chief Minister
- Constituting instrument: Constitution of Pakistan
- Formation: 1843; 178 years ago
- Website: commissionerkarachi.gos.pk

The Commissioner Karachi Division is the top executive of the Karachi Division, Pakistan, overseeing all maters within the division. The position holder is a Grade-21 Officer who reports to the Provincial Chief Minister and the Provincial Chief Secretary. The position is deemed as one of the most important posts in Pakistan.

The current Commissioner Karachi Division is Syed Hassan Naqvi, an officer of the Pakistan Administrative Service.

The Commissioner Karachi Division is the central authority within the entire division, with all deputy commissioners serving within the jurisdictions of the division reporting to the commissioner. Currently there are seven districts within the division, thus seven deputy commissioners report to the commissioner.

Commissioner Karachi is the Chief Controller of Civil Defense within the division, thus responsible for the law and order situation.

== Roles and powers of the Commissioner Karachi Division ==
The principal workplace of the Commissioner is the Commissioner Office, located in heart of Karachi Division. The official residence, known as Commissioner House, is near the Commissioner Office. The Commissioner is the chief executive who exercises the authority of the Government of Sindh in the division. In practice, the Commissioner nominates the Deputy Commissioners who serve as the top-executives of their districts.

The Commissioner serves as the Chief Coordinating Officer between the Federal and Provincial Governments along with its allies, spearheading joint efforts of coordination.

The Commissioner Karachi is usually always in charge/Chairman of:

- Chief Controller Civil Defense
- Chairman Divisional Oversight Committee
- Chairman Divisional Task Force Committee
- Chairman Anti-Corruption Committee (II)
- Controller General Prices and Supplies
- Chairman Karachi Task Force for Polio Eradication
- Chairman Regional Transport Authority
- Chairman Divisional Arms Board
- Chairman Departmental Promotion Committee (IV), Sindh

Most of the land and revenue related powers of the Commissioner were given to Senior Member Board of Revenue under the Sindh Land Revenue Act, 1967. However the Commissioner still exercises control over all Revenue Officers in the division, along with being the competent authority to withdraw and transfer revenue cases from one officer to another, or can choose to dispose of them. The Commissioner can also dispose of cases pertaining to revenue entries blocked by the Board of Revenue.

The Commissioner Karachi is also appointed as the Controller General/Inspector General of Prices and Supplies for Karachi Division. The role is entrusted in regulating prices of essential commodities. The Commissioner Karachi Division is also the custodian of religious and worship places in Karachi Division, and serves as the Chairman of Arts Council of Pakistan.

Unlike other Divisions across Pakistan, the Karachi Division only consists of the city of Karachi.

== List of Commissioner Karachi ==
List of Commissioner's Karachi Division
No	Name of Commissioner Karachi	Starting term	Ending term
1	Iftikhar Ali Shallwani	before August 2020	August 2020
2	Sohail Rajput	August 2020	September 2020
3	Iftikhar Ali Shallwani	November 2020	December 2020
4	Navid Ahmed Shaikh	December 2020	October 2021
5	Muhammad Iqbal Memon	October 2021	September 2023
6	Muhammad Salim Rajput	September 2023	April 2024
7	Syed Hassan Nqvi	April 2024	Incumbent

== Districts Under Karachi Division ==
Districts	Population
Karachi Central District	2,971,382
Karachi South District	2,875,315
Karachi West District	2,077,228
Karachi East District	2,875,315
Malir District	1,924,346
Keamari District	1,829,837
Korangi District	2,577,556

== See also ==
- Pakistan Administrative Service
- Government of Sindh
- Chairman Planning & Development Board
- Commissioners of Sind in British India
