= Naimatullah Khan =

Pakistani politician (1930–2020)

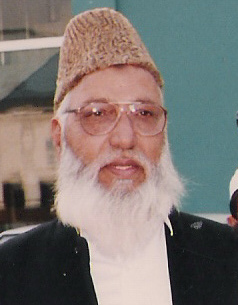
- Naimatullah Khan

26th Mayor of Karachi (City Nazim in Urdu language)
- In office 14 August 2001 – May 2005
- Preceded by: Farooq Sattar
- Succeeded by: Syed Mustafa Kamal

Personal details
- Born: 1 October 1930 Ajmer, British India (now India)
- Died: 25 February 2020 (aged 89) Karachi, Sindh, Pakistan
- Party: Jamaat-e-Islami Pakistan (2001-2020)
- Education: University of the Punjab; Karachi University
- Occupation: Politician

Naimatullah Khan (1 October 1930 – 25 February 2020) was a Pakistani politician who served as the City Nazim (Mayor) of Karachi from August 2001 to June 2005.

== Early life and career ==
He was born to Abdul Shakoor Khan on 1 October 1930. He was an ethnic Rohilkand Pashtun, born into the Rohilla Branch of the Yusufzai tribe. He was also related to the Bangash Nawabs of Farrukhabad.

He graduated from Punjab University with a Masters in Journalism and a Law Degree from Karachi University. He was a lawyer by profession and had practiced law for 34 years. He had 9 children and was also a grandfather. He was the chairman of the biggest NGO of Pakistan, Alkhidmat Foundation. As Mayor of Karachi, in 2005, he was selected to be a contesting candidate in the Top-20 Mayors of the World list.

== Mayor of Karachi ==
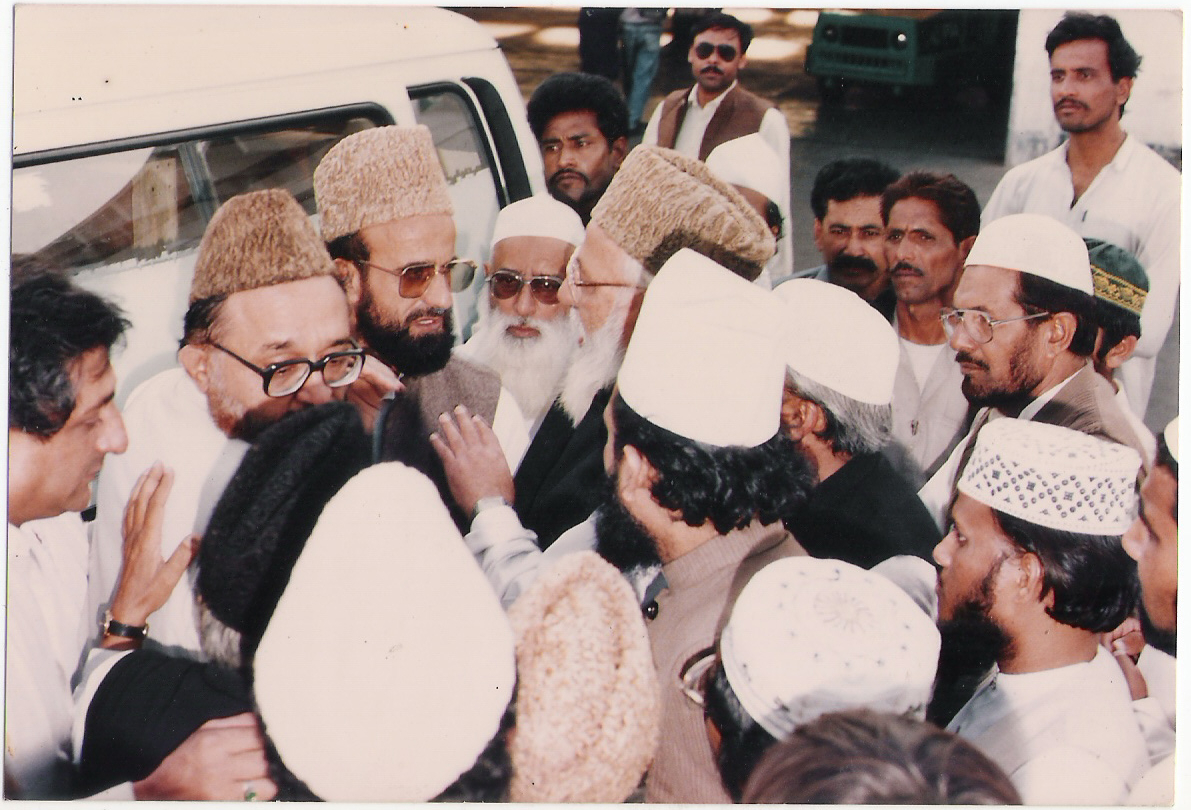
Naimatullah with Muneeb ur Rehman

He was the first Nāzim of Karachi after the devolution plan under President Pervez Musharraf regime in Pakistan. He belonged to Jamaat-e-Islami being inspired by the thoughts of Abul A'la Maududi and Naeem Siddiqui. Naimatullah Khan was elected City Nazim (Mayor) in 2001. When he assumed his office, Karachi had the worst possible and poor roads. Naimatullah Khan succeeded in getting an amount of Rs. 2900 million for reconstruction of Karachi. Karachi city council approved various projects such as 18 flyovers over major roads, six underpasses, two signal-free roads and a huge water supply scheme for the people of Karachi. It was for the first time in the history of Karachi that all the stake holders in Karachi were incorporated for the developmental work in Karachi. The Karachi development plan comprised signal-free main roads, many fly overs, underpasses and the replacement of many water and sewerage lines. One of his projects, as the city mayor, was the LNG fitted Green Line Bus Project for Karachi where he imported buses from Sweden.

Naimatullah Khan was instrumental in introducing cheap transport and building many new family parks out of barren land in Karachi city of some 15 million people, the world's 5th largest city in 2005. The main reason for his popularity was his honesty, sense of responsibility and commitment. He worked tirelessly for Karachi with limited funds.

Another publicly well-admired idea that he introduced was to involve local boys from the villages situated near the Arabian Sea surrounding the 64 km coastal belt of Karachi. These local village boys, familiar with the sea, were good swimmers and were hired on a contract basis as lifeguards to help protect common beach visitors and picnickers when they attempted to swim in the sea for fun. In September 2017, Karachi beaches had to be sealed by authorities in the wake of 55 people drowning in the three months period.

Naimatullah Khan resigned from his office in June 2005, and was not re-elected in Pakistan's next 2005 local city elections.

== Death ==
Naimatullah Khan died on 25 February 2020 at the age of 89 in Karachi, Pakistan after a prolonged illness.
