= Karachi Metropolitan Corporation =

Local civic body in Karachi, Sindh, Pakistan

Karachi Metropolitan Corporation شرکت شہرداری کراچی
- 2023-2027 term

Type
- Type: Metropolitan Corporation of Karachi
- Term limits: 5 years

History
- Founded: 1933; 93 years ago
- Preceded by: Karachi Municipal Corporation

Leadership
- Mayor: Murtaza Wahab, PPP (since 15 June 2023)
- Deputy Mayor: Salman Abdullah Murad, PPP (since 15 June 2023)

Structure
- Seats: 367
- Political groups: Government (169): PPP (151); PML(N) (14); JUI(F) (4); Opposition (194): JI (130); PTI (62); TLP (1); MQM–H (1)

Elections
- Voting system: Mixed member majoritarian: 246 members elected by FPTP; 81 seats for women, 12 seats for labourers, 12 seats for youth, 12 seats for non-Muslims, 2 seats for disabled, 2 seats for transgenders through PR
- Last election: 15 January 2023

Meeting place
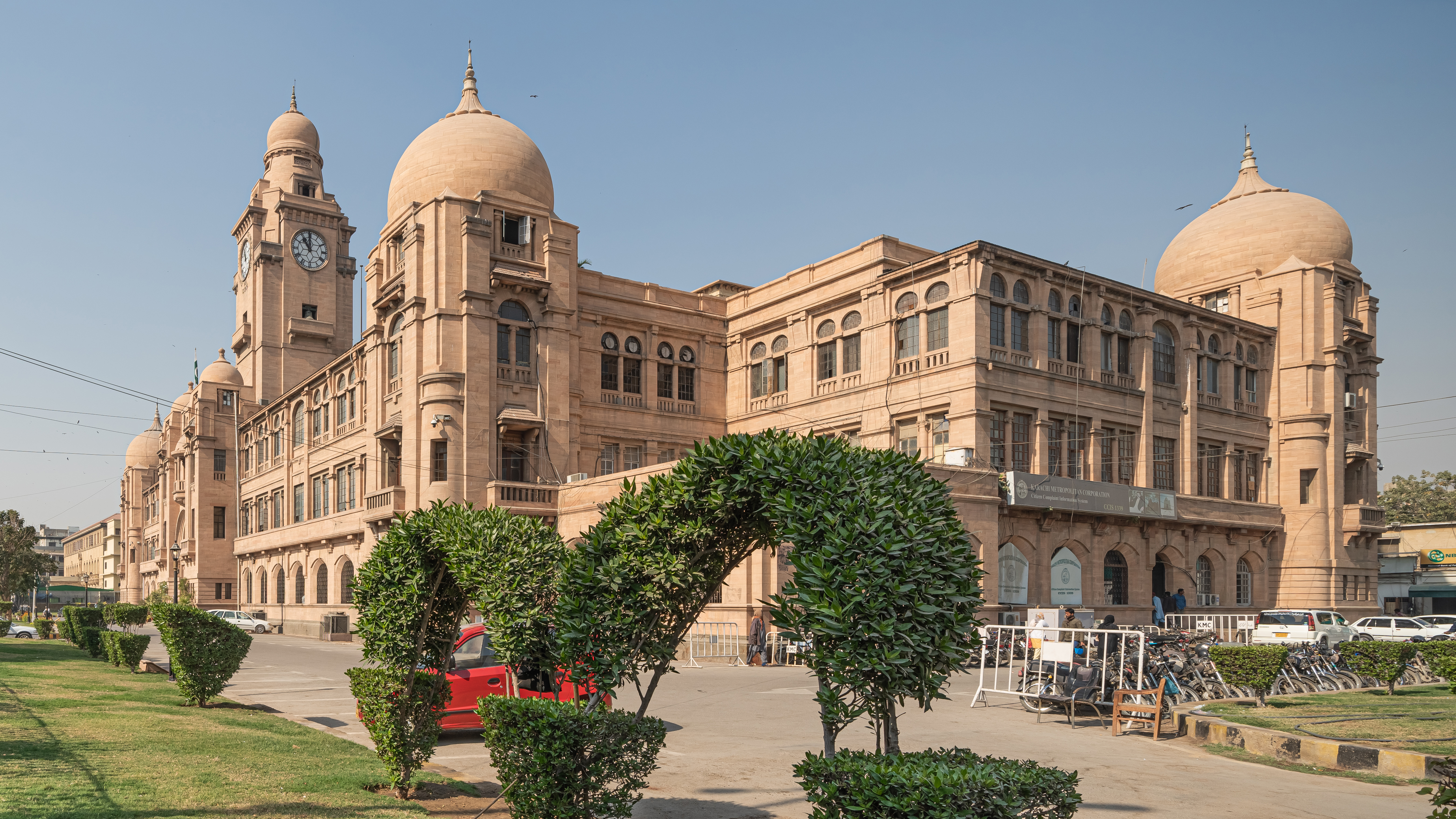
- City Council Hall

Website
- www.kmc.gos.pk

Constitution
- Sindh Local Government Act 2013

Karachi Metropolitan Corporation (Urdu: شرکت شہرداری کراچی) is a public corporation and governing body to provide municipal services in most of Karachi, the capital of Sindh.

== History ==
=== 1846 ===
Karachi Conservancy Board was established to control cholera epidemics in Karachi during British rule in 1846. The board was upgraded into the Municipal Commission in 1852.

=== 1853 ===
In 1853 the Municipal Commission was turned into Karachi Municipal Committee. The foundation stone of the Karachi Municipal Corporation Building was laid on Bandar Road in 1927.

=== 1933 ===
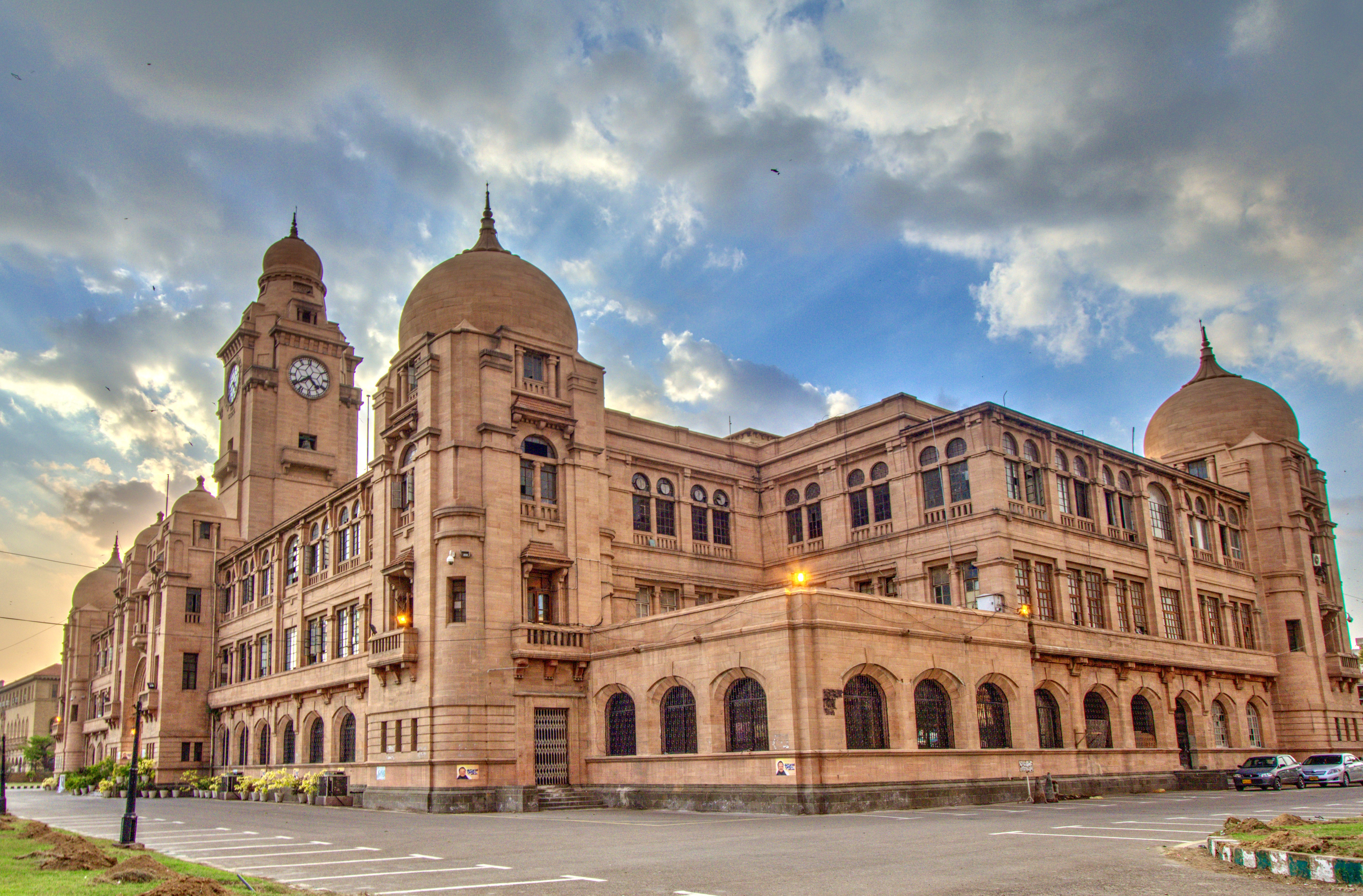
The Karachi Municipal Corporation Building has evolved an iconic status as one of the landmark structures of Karachi

In 1933 the Karachi Municipal Committee was upgraded to the Karachi Municipal Corporation by the Karachi Municipal Act.

=== 1976 ===
The Karachi Municipal Corporation was turned into the Karachi Metropolitan Corporation in 1976.

=== 1987 ===
Zonal Municipal Committees were established in 1987. The zonal committees were merged again into the Karachi Metropolitan Corporation. Five district municipal corporations were established in 1987.

=== 2000 ===
The Karachi Metropolitan Corporation was abolished in 2000 and five district municipal corporations were merged into City District Karachi. The City District Karachi was divided into 18 town and 178 union councils.

=== 2011 ===
In 2011 Sindh Government restored again Karachi Metropolitan Corporation and five district municipal corporations.

=== 2015 ===
In 2015, the Karachi Metropolitan Corporation consisted of 305 members, including 209 general members and chairmen of union committees, and 96 reserved members.

The numbers of KMC council members since 1979 is as follows:

KMC counsel members (1884–2016)
| SN | Tenure | Counsel head and post | Members |
|---|---|---|---|
| 1 | 1884 | | 32 |
| 2 | 1910 | | 36 |
| 3 | 1933 | Jamshed Nusserwanji Mehta | 57 |
| 4 | 1979-1983 | Abdul Sattar Afghani (Mayor) | 166 |
| 5 | 1983-1987 | Abdul Sattar Afghani (Mayor) | 232 |
| 6 | 1988-1992 | Dr. Farooq Sattar (Mayor) | 77 |
| 7 | 2001-2005 | Naimatullah Khan (Mayor) | 255 |
| 8 | 2005-2010 | Syed Mustafa Kamal (Nazim Karachi) | 255 |
| 9 | 2016-2020 | Waseem Akhter (Mayor) | 308 |
| 10 | 2023-2027 | Murtaza Wahab (Mayor) | 367 |

== Budget ==
KMC and Karachi budget formulated by its mayors and administrators during their tenure.

| Fiscal Year | Amount (Rs. Billion) | Amount ($. Million) | Mayor | Administrator | Notes |
|---|---|---|---|---|---|
| 1970-71 | 0.1008 | | - | | |
| 1971-72 | 0.103 | | - | | |
| 1972-73 | 0.113 | | - | | |
| 1973-74 | 0.162 | | - | | |
| 1974-75 | 0.191 | | - | | |
| 1975-76 | 0.243 | | - | | |
| 1976-77 | 0.253 | | - | | |
| 1977-78 | 0.324 | | - | | |
| 1978-79 | 0.388 | | - | | |
| 1979-80 | 0.459 | | Abdul Sattar Afghani | | |
| 1980-81 | 0.549 | | sic | | |
| 1981-82 | 0.628 | | sic | | |
| 1982-83 | 0.891 | | sic | | |
| 1983-84 | 0.940 | 70 | sic | - | |
| 1984-85 | 1.127 | 83.4 | sic | - | |
| 1985-86 | | | sic | | |
| 1986-87 | | | sic | | |
| 1987-88 | | | sic | | |
| 1988-89 | 1.936 | 105 | Farooq Sattar | | revenues grew at an average rate of 11 per year from 1988 to 1992, well below the nominal growth of Karachi (ADB study). |
| 1989-90 | 2.482 | 118 | sic | | revenues grew at an average rate of 11 per year from 1988 to 1992, well below the nominal growth of Karachi (ADB study). |
| 1990-91 | | | sic | | revenues grew at an average rate of 11 per year from 1988 to 1992, well below the nominal growth of Karachi (ADB study). |
| 1991-92 | 2.841 | 115 | sic | | revenues grew at an average rate of 11 per year from 1988 to 1992, well below the nominal growth of Karachi (ADB study). |
| 1994-95 | 4.5 | 151 | - | Faheem Zaman Khan | |
| 2001-02 | 5.7 | 102 | Naimatullah Khan | - | |
| 2002-03 | 20.5 | 320 | sic | - | |
| 2003-04 | 27.7 | 470 | sic | - | |
| 2004-05 | 32.6 | 560 | sic | - | |
| 2005-06 | 43.8 | 740 | | | |
| 2006-07 | 44.2 | 730 | Mustafa Kamal | - | |
| 2007-08 | 45.695 | 750 | sic | - | |
| 2008-09 | 37.1 | 460 | sic | - | |
| 2009-10 | 52.36 | 610 | sic | - | |
| 2010-11 | 53.9 | 630 | - | Fazl-ur-Rehman | |
| 2011-12 | 44.5 | 510 | - | M. Hussain Sayed | |
| 2012-13 | 31.6 | 330 | - | sic | |
| 2013-14 | 35.5 | 330 | - | Hashim Raza Zaidi | |
| 2014-15 | 33.1 | 320 | - | Rauf Akhter | |
| 2015-16 | 33.8 | 320 | - | Roshan Ali Sheikh | |
| 2016-17 | 26.7 | 250 | - | Laiq Ahmed | |
| 2017-18 | 27.1 | 251 | Waseem Akhter | - | |
| 2018-19 | 27.1 | 220 | sic | - | |
| 2019-20 | 26.4 | 170 | sic | - | |
| 2020-21 | 24.8 | 150 | sic | - | |

== KMC legal counsels ==
Muhammad Umar Lakhani
Hassan Abidi
Barrister Asad Ahmed
Maria Tahir Chaudhry
Malik Altaf Hussain
Mohsen Khan
Khurram Gayas
Chaudhry Arif
Muhammad Yameen Soomro

== KMC-operated hospitals ==
- Sobhraj Maternity Hospital
- Karachi Medical & Dental College
- Karachi Institute of Heart Diseases
- Abbasi Shaheed Hospital
- Sarfaraz Shaheed Hospital
- Spencer's Ey Hospital
- Leprosy Hospital

== See also ==
- Karachi Development Authority
- Administrator Karachi
- Commissioner Karachi
- Mayor of Karachi
- Karachi Conservancy Board
- Karachi Municipal Commission
- Karachi Municipal Committee
- City District Government of Karachi
- Government of Karachi
