= Developments in Karachi =

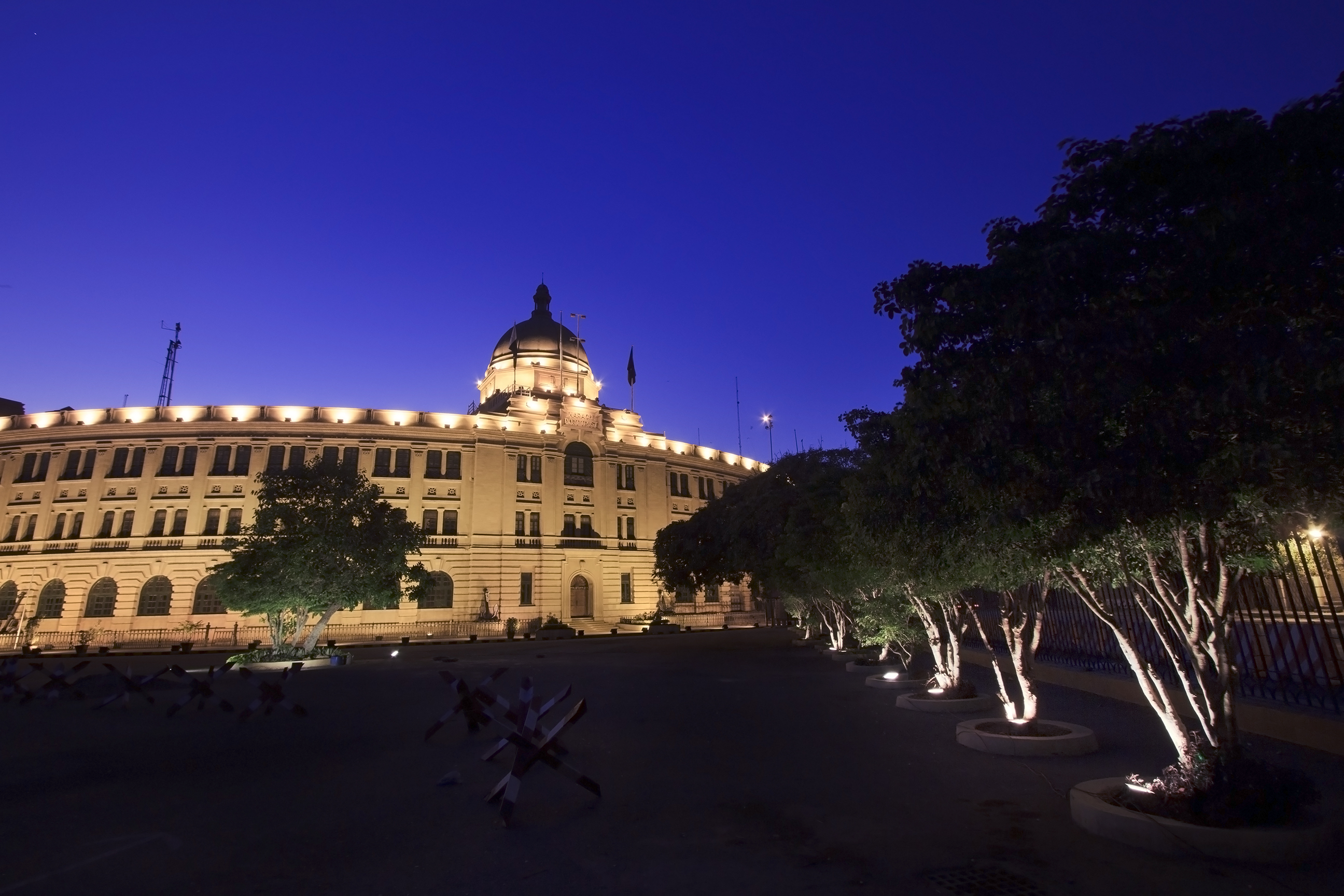
Karachi Port Trust Building

Karachi is located on the coastline of Sindh province in southern Pakistan, along a natural harbour on the Arabian Sea. The city has a very diverse population with very affluent areas such as Clifton and large areas of people living in middle class environments. Karachi is ranked as a Beta world city in the GaWC index, and is widely recognized as the prime financial and transport hub of Pakistan.

The city is home to range of developments from foreign investors and local investors such as Malik Riaz, however due to high corruption in the country, many projects have been delayed or completed at an unsatisfactory standard.

I. I. Chundrigar Road

== Completed developments in Karachi ==
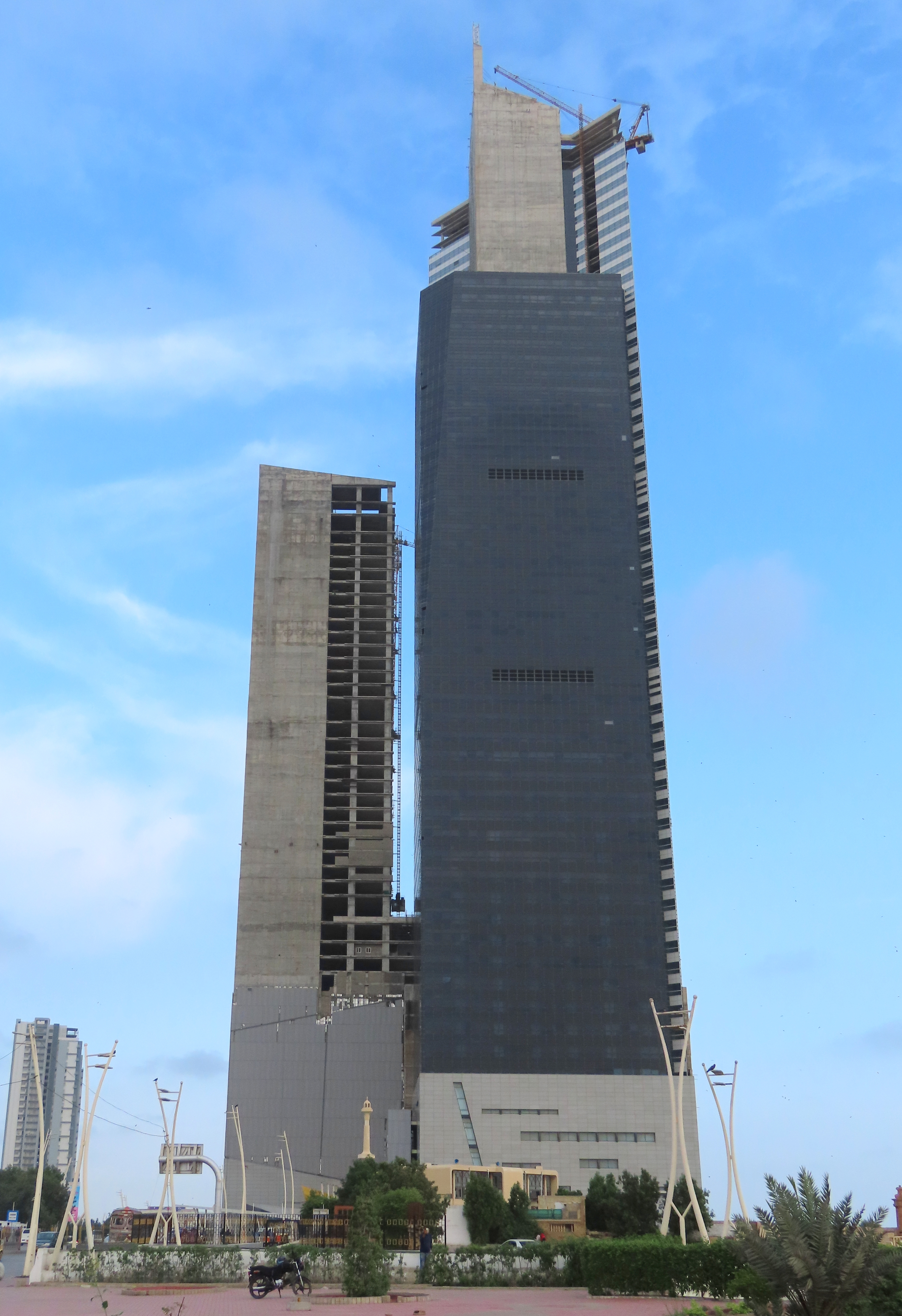
Tallest building in Pakistan

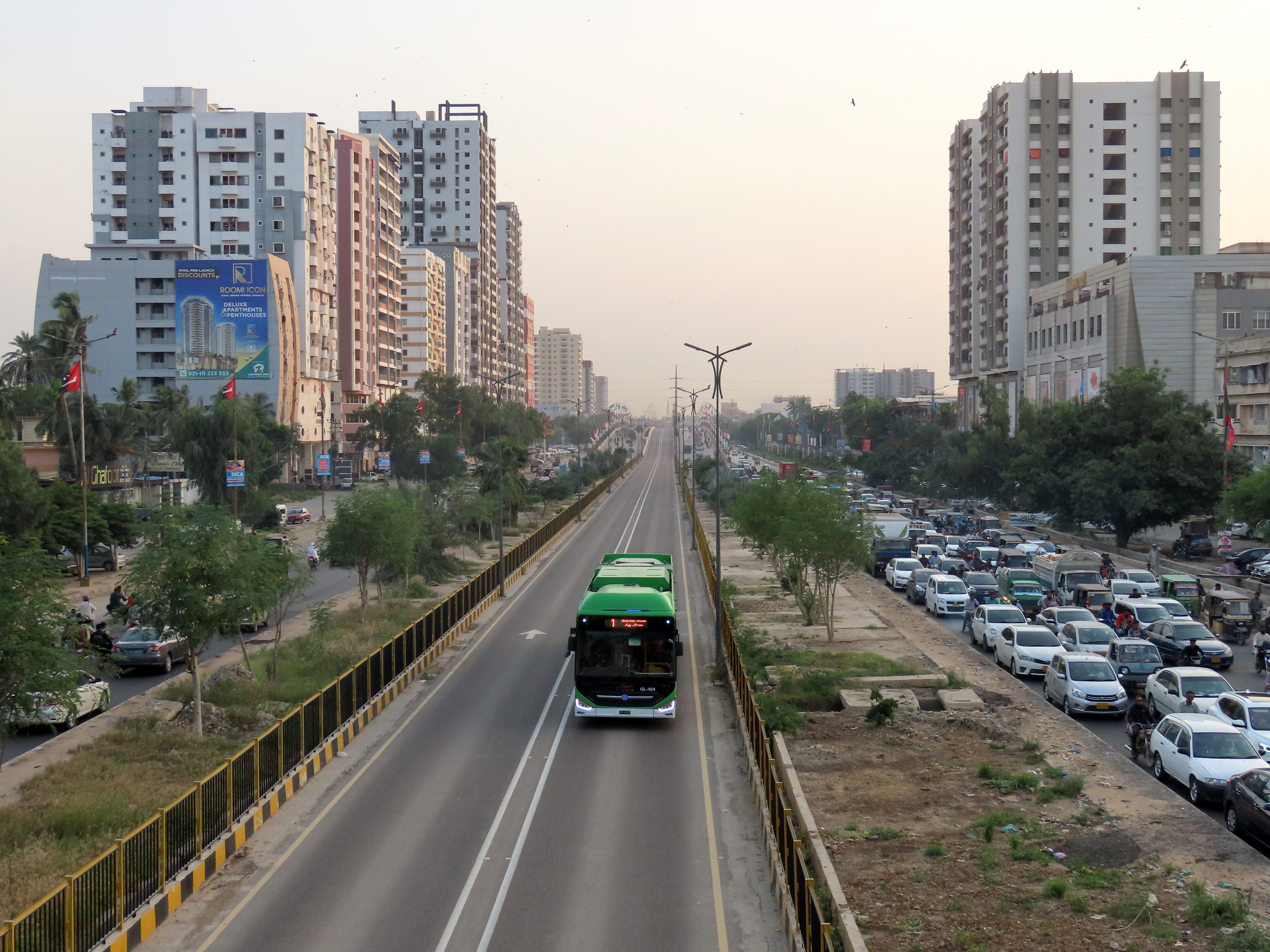
Greeline Metrobus passing through North Nazimabad.

=== Malir Expressway ===
Malir Expressway is a 39 km expressway starting from Qayyumabad and ending near Kathore on the Superhighway (M-9) on the Malir River. The expressway is the Southern alternative route for carrying traffic of the port and industrial areas to main highway. It is built for the convenience of high-income areas' commuters as well. This expressway is built on the Malir River. Construction started in early-2022 even before the Environmental Impact Assessment (EIA) had been conducted by the provincial environmental authority; there were over 100 objections raised on the EIA yet the no-objection certificate was issued by the provincial government. The project upto Kathore was opened on 22 May 2026 for public and toll tax was also increased.

=== M-9 Motorway Karachi-Hyderabad ===
The M-9 (Urdu: موٹروے 9) is a 136-km long 6-lane motorway connecting the cities of Hyderabad and Karachi in the Sindh province of Pakistan. It is a part of Pakistan's Motorways Network. It opened for public in 2016. It would be further expanded to 8-lanes in the future.

=== Bahria Icon Tower ===
Bahria Icon Tower is Pakistan's tallest building and was one of the tallest in south Asia. The complex includes a 62-storey and 40-storey mixed-used buildings, its 62-storey tower is the tallest building in Pakistan. The complex is based on a four-acre plot in the upscale Clifton area. The complex is owned by the Bahria Town Group.

The building consists of 10 floors of serviced corporate offices, 40 floors of serviced apartments, Pakistan's highest located terraced restaurant and South Asia's first double-decker high speed elevator along with a shopping mall.

The building is topped out thus meaning it is technically completed.

=== Green Line ===
The Green Line extends from Municipal Park to Surjani Town at a total length of 21 km (13 mi). 2.5 km of this still needs to be completed. Government of Pakistan financed majority of the project. Construction of Green Line began in February 2016 and was partially opened in December 2021. The line has 25 bus stations 3 of which still have to be constructed. Engineering Associates were contracted as the designers and supervision consultants for Green Line while a Consortium of "Ernest & Young", "Exponent Engineers" & "Haider Mota & BNR" were contracted for "Transaction Advisory for Bus Operational Plan". Green Line has 80 buses. Fare was set 55 Rupees. A Command and Control Centre will later be established at the Garden West.

=== Orange Line ===
The Abdul Sattar Edhi Line, formally named the Orange Line is a 3.9 km (2.4 mi) bus rapid transit line of the Karachi Metrobus which runs through Orangi Town. The maximum daily ridership is 50,000. With a mere 20 Rupee fare, the Orange Line was inaugurated on 10 September 2022 by Sharjeel Memon.

== Developments under construction ==
=== Karachi Circular Railway ===
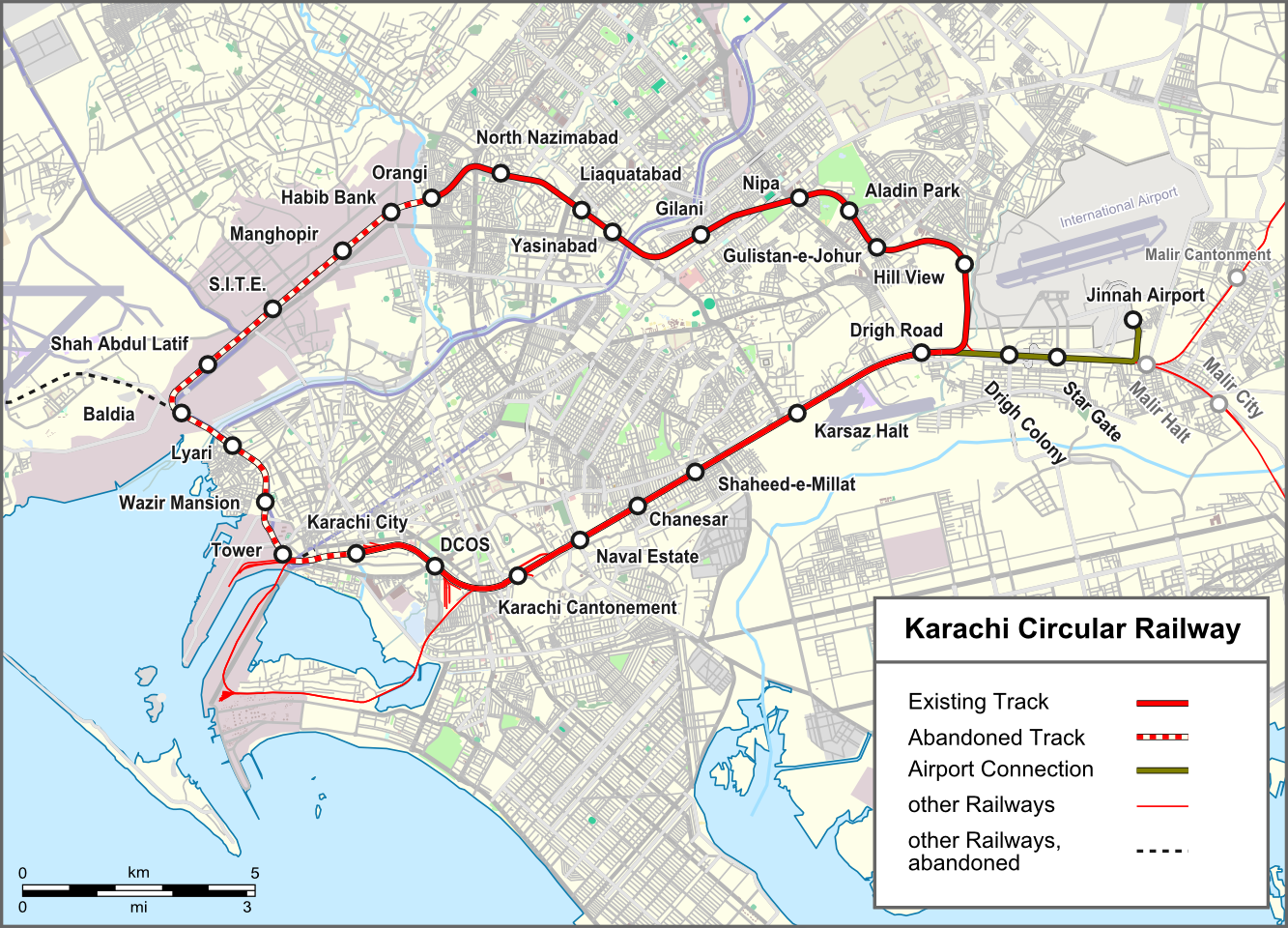
KCR route map

The Karachi circular railway is a 44 km railway circle that existed but was closed. Existing railway tracks and 30 stations would be completely rebuilt on bridges for a modern driverless electric bullet train. This project is also part of CPEC. Total cost of the project would be 294 billion PKR. The KCR would be run by the Sindh Government through Karachi Urban Transport Corporation (KUTC). KCR would be used by 500,000 passengers/day which would increase to 1 million in later years. KCR would run 17-hours a day & 7-days a week. Construction started in 2022 by FWO and would complete by 2025.

=== Bahria Town Karachi ===
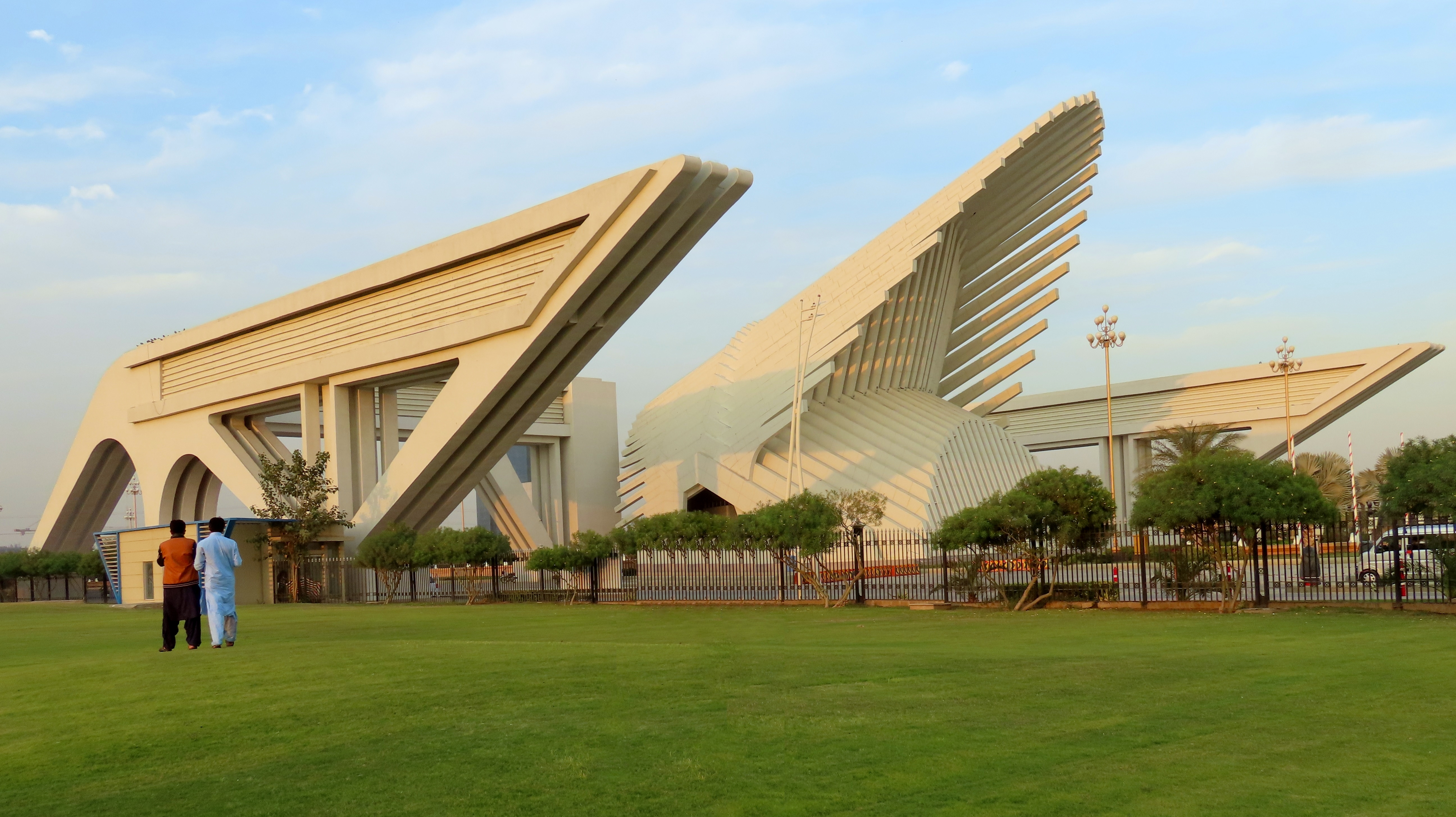
Bahria Town Karachi Gate

Bahria Town Karachi is a privately owned gated neighbourhood under-construction by the Bahria Town Group since 2015. The project is 25 km in length and 10 km in width. It consists of 58 precincts. The town has food streets, mosques, hospitals, educational institutions, a stadium, a zoo, highrise buildings, parks, monuments, recreational areas and much more. It is a hot location for real estate investors and a picnic spot for families. The Grand Mosque of Bahria Town would be the 3rd largest in the world and largest in Pakistan once completed. The Rafi cricket stadium in Bahria Town would be largest cricket stadium in Pakistan once completed.

=== Crescent Bay ===
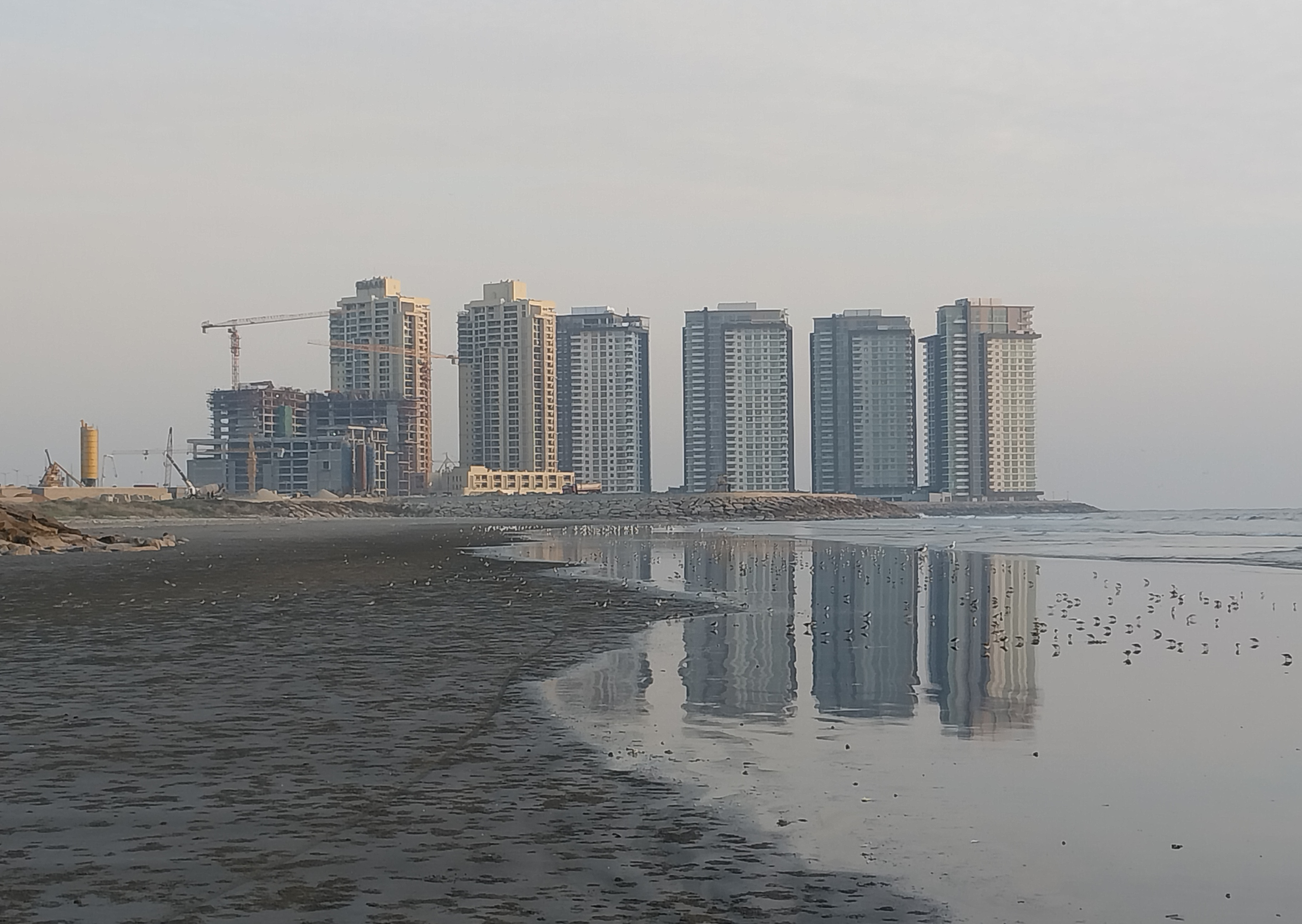
Emaar Towers as of 2022

Crescent Bay by EMAAR is a 108-acre (440,000 m^{2}) under-construction upscale mixed-use oceanfront development. It is one of the biggest projects in Karachi.

The development will contain a series of highrise towers for residential and commercial use, a shopping centre, a five-star beachfront hotel and an Iconic tower located in the heart of the project. The development includes approximately 4,000 residential apartments. Launched on May 31, 2006, when completed this would be the first development with a private beach and the first built on reclaimed land.

=== K-IV Water Project ===
K-IV water project is a 120 km fresh water canal that will link Keenjhar Lake with Karachi city. This project will provide 260 Million gallons of fresh water per day to Karachi city hence eradicating water scarcity. The project will have 2 pumping stations and 3 filtration plants. Construction started in 2004. 100 km of canal is completed by Frontier Works Organization. Project remained on hold due to technical and design issues. Construction again started in 2023 by WAPDA and is expected to complete by December 2024. Delays have multiplied cost of the project.

=== New Hub Canal ===
Karachi's mayor Murtaza Wahab who is also the chairman of Karachi Water and Sewerage Board announced the new Hub Canal project in April 2024. The project has started and will complete within 1 year. Project's cost is 12 billion Pakistani Rupees. The new hub canal will provide 200 MGD water to karachi city. Once this new canal is complete, district west, Kemari, district central and lyari will benefit the most. This project will greatly reduce water scarcity in Karachi city.

As of 13 Aug, 2025, Old Hub Canal is under renovation. The old canal is 50 years old.

On, 13 Aug, 2025 Bilawal Bhutto inaugurates New Hub Canal. Capacity of the new canal is 100 MGD (million gallons per day), while canal supply water from Hub Dam to Karachi. The Canal will serve people in district Keamari and Karachi West. The Cost of New Canal is Rs 12.8 billion.

=== Red Line ===
The 27 km Red Line is part of Karachi Breeze. Construction started in mid-2022 and will complete by mid-2024. Red Line will connect Sadar in central-Karachi to Malir in eastern-Karachi via University Road. Projected daily ridership is 300,000 passengers.

Approximately 9000 trees will be relocated to make way for this project. It is the first transportation project in the world to receive funding from the UN Green Climate Fund for use of biomethane gas from cow dung to power buses.

== Proposed developments ==
=== Hawkes Bay/Mauripur Expressway ===
The Hawkes Bay Expressway (also known as Mauripur Expressway) is a proposed 13 km expressway along Mauripur Road to connect Karachi with scenic beaches along the Arabian Sea coast.

=== Redevelopment of Coastline ===
A Chinese firm is working on a $3.1 billion redevelopment project along Karachi’s coast. In this plan, one of the city’s largest slums, Machar Colony will be cleared completely. Several meetings have been held between Federal Minister for Maritime Affairs Syed Faisal Ali Subzwari and China Road and Bridge Corporation (CRBC) Vice President Ye Chengyin at the Ministry of Maritime Affairs. In line with the focus of CPEC Phase-II and the principle of green and sustainable development, CRBC has initiated the blueprint for Karachi Coastal Comprehensive Development Zone project (KCCDZ).

=== Bundal Island ===
Development of Bundal Island offshore DHA Phase-8 was proposed by owner of Bahria Town Malik Riaz in 2013. It was again proposed by then prime minister Imran Khan in 2018. The development would cost $20billion and would take 5 years to complete. The 12,000 acre Island will have hospitals, sports facilities, shopping malls, high-rise buildings, 5-star hotels, educational institutes, recreational facilities & a scenic beach. These developments would give housing and employment to over a million people by 2030. The island would be connected to mainland Karachi by a cable-stayed bridge.

=== Widening of Northern Bypass (M-10) ===
M-10 is mostly used by heavy vehicles to bypass the city. Widening of M-10 into 6 lanes was proposed by Mustafa Kamal of MQM but was never executed due to incompetent governments. Traffic is increasing every passing day. Project is still on the cards with a greater ring road that might be up to 150 km in circumference.

=== Desalination Plants ===
Multiple Desalination plants on western coast near KANUPP were proposed by then mayor Syed Mustafa Kamal in 2009. These were again proposed by then prime minister Imran Khan in 2019. These were once again announced by Administrator Karachi Murtaza Wahab in 2022. No ground work has been done. If constructed, these desalination plants would provide upto 300 Million gallons of water per day hence eradicate water scarcity in western and southern parts of Karachi including Orangi Town, S.I.T.E industrial area, Lyari, Machar Colony, Sadar, Clifton and DHA.

=== IT Park and University ===
The Federal Minister for Information Technology & Telecommunication will lay the foundation for the Karachi IT Park. This project is under consideration now.

The Ministry of Information Technology and Telecommunication (MoITT) said that plans are in the works for the IT Park’s groundbreaking ceremony at Jinnah International Airport. Ceremony will be attended by officials from South Korea, the Sindh government, the MoITT, and important business sector partners.

The groundbreaking ceremony will be followed by soil testing and the construction of a border wall, according to sources. The MoITT has also begun the recruiting process for expressions of interest (EoIs) for the park’s first design. The federal government opted to build the IT Park near Jinnah International Airport, which is positioned in the heart of the metropolis’s commerce and economic district. The project’s entire cost is Rs. 31 billion, and the South Korean government has promised to fund it. According to the MoITT, it is expected to contribute 85 percent of the cash as well as technical assistance. About 210 IT firms with almost 8,400 people will be housed at the IT Park, which will also include a multi-story skyscraper. It will be 106,449 square metres in size, with 8 floors above ground & 3 basement levels. There will include offices, meeting rooms, a daycare facility, amenities, and a parking space in the structure.

== See also ==
- Transport in Karachi
- Economy of Karachi
