= Chamkani, Peshawar =

Coordinates: 34°00′N 71°39′E

Chamkani
- Village and Union Council
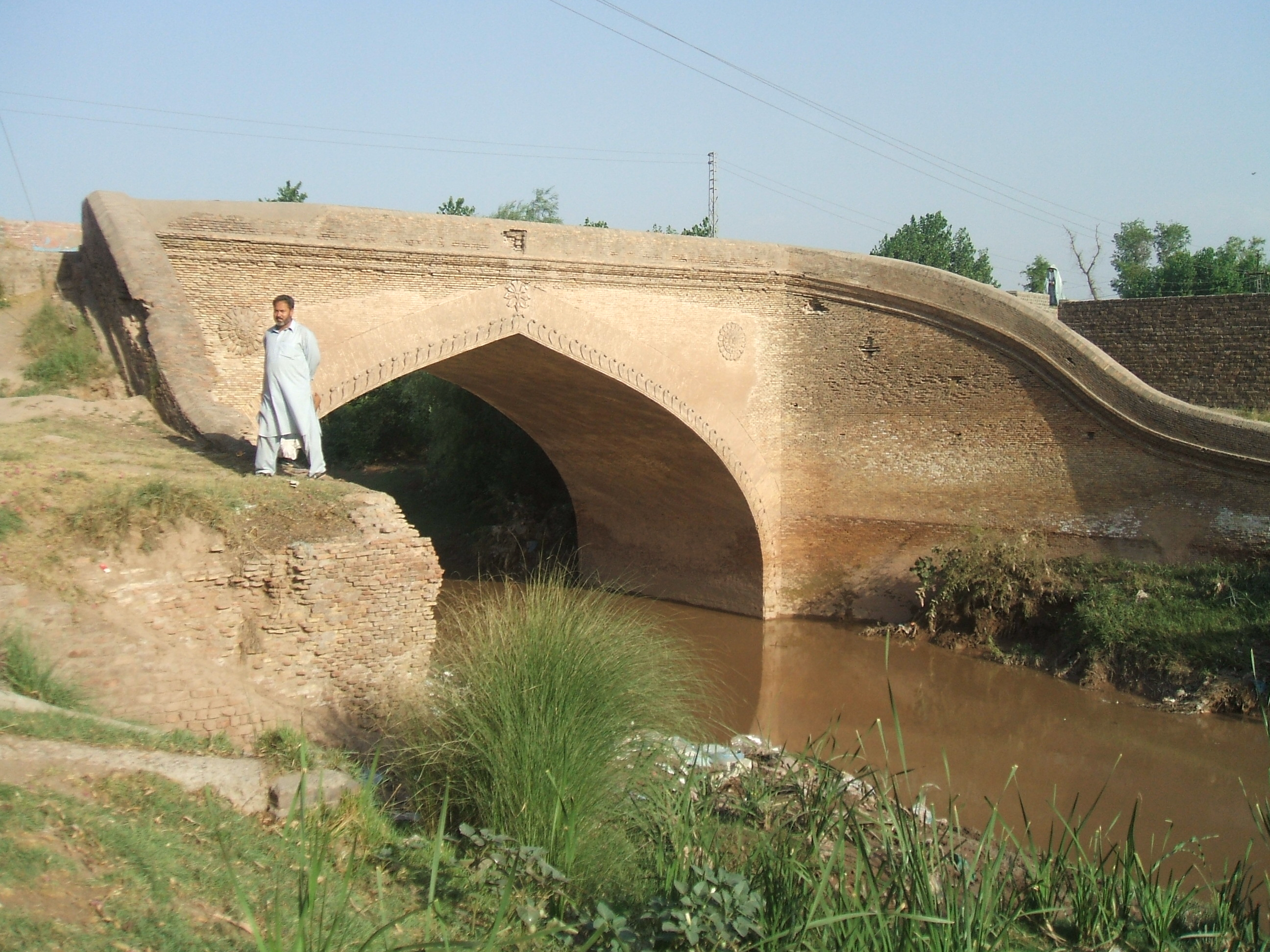
- An old bridge in Chamkani
- Interactive map of Chamkani
- Country: Pakistan
- Region: Khyber Pakhtunkhwa
- District: Peshawar
- Tehsil: Peshawar

Government
  - Type: Tehsil-council
  - Chairman: Arbab Muhammad Umar Khan (ANP)
- Time zone: UTC+5 (PST)

Chamkani (Pashto: څمکنۍ) is a neighborhood of Peshawar in Khyber Pakhtunkhwa, Pakistan. It is named after the Chamkani tribe of Pashtuns, who are based in the Tsamkani District of Paktia Province, Afghanistan, as well as in Kurram District, Khyber Pakhtunkhwa, Pakistan. The Peshawar BRT connects it to Karkhano market.

The neighbourhood was originally named Tsamkani after the Pashtun tribe, but later on changed to Chamkani or Sokani. Its people are called Chamkaniwaal or Sokaniwaal.
