= Orange Line (Karachi Breeze) =

Pakistani bus route in Karachi, opened 2022

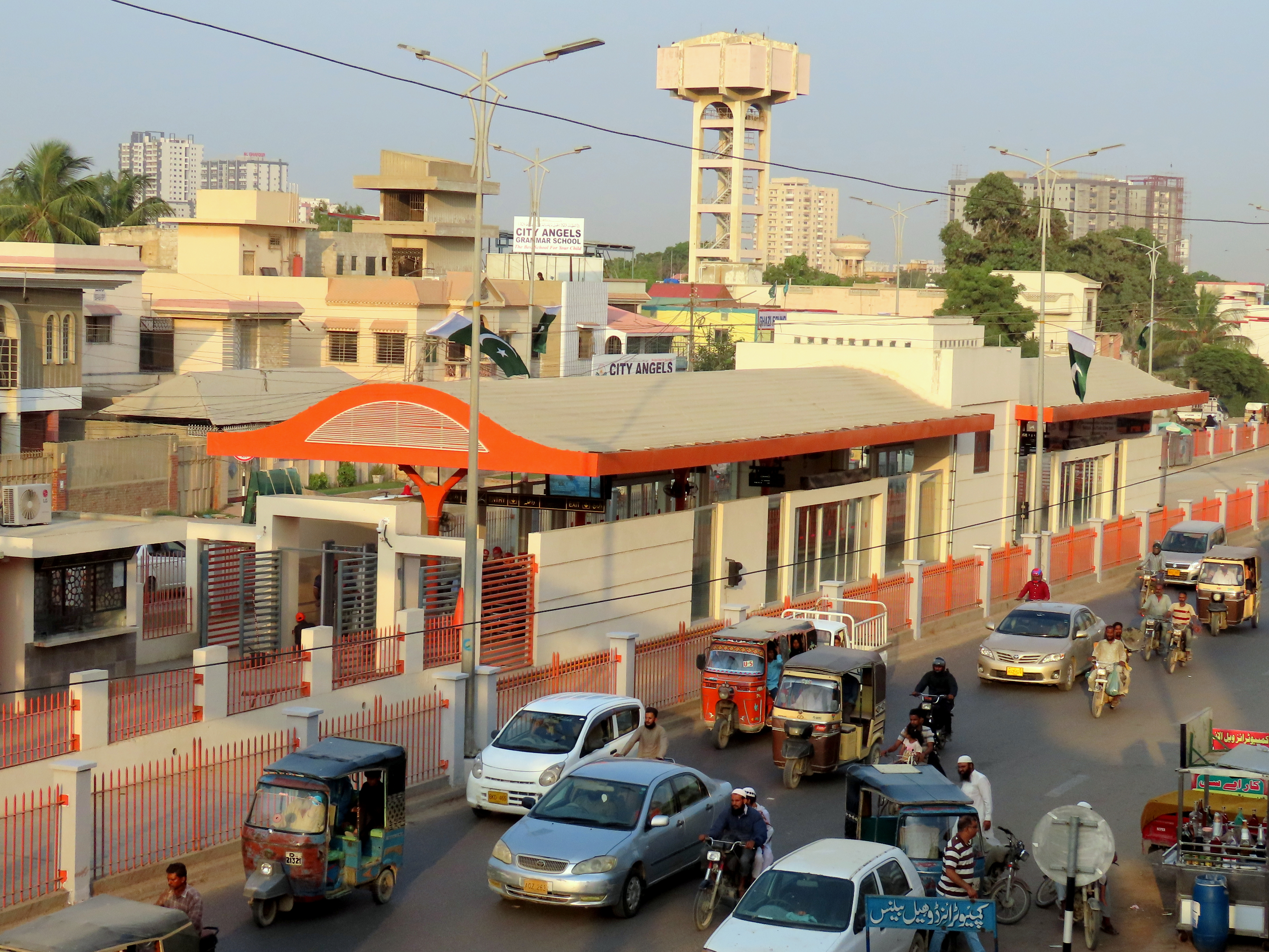
- A station of Orange Line also known as Edhi Line.

Overview
- System: Karachi Metrobus
- Operator: Government of Sindh; Government of Pakistan
- Vehicle: 20 Hybrid electric bus
- Status: Active
- Began service: September 10, 2022; 4 years ago

Route
- Route type: Bus rapid transit
- Locale: Karachi, Sindh, Pakistan
- Stops: 4

The Orange Line, also known as the Abdul Sattar Edhi Line, is a 3.88 km (2.4 mi) bus rapid transit line of the Karachi Breeze metropolitan area bus system in Karachi, Sindh, Pakistan. It is the smallest of the five Metrobus lines in the city. The current daily ridership is 3,000. The route goes from Board Office to TMO Office (Orangi Town). It was inaugurated on 10 September 2022.

== History ==
Originally named the Orange Line, construction began on 11 June 2016. Chief Minister of Sindh Syed Qaim Ali Shah inaugurated the construction work, while Rs. 2 billion were earmarked by the Government of Sindh for the project's completion. National Engineering Services Pakistan served as the consultants, with principal engineer Rehan Zamin serving as the project manager. On 13 December 2016, the Government of Sindh renamed the Orange Line after the late philanthropist Abdul Sattar Edhi, in recognition of his services to the poor.

Initially planned to be completed in one year, the project faced numerous delays, which meant it could not become operational until 2022.

The Orange Line was formally inaugurated on 10 September 2022 and began operations the same day. Twenty air-conditioned buses are to be plied on the route, each with a capacity of 90 passengers. The ticket fare is Rs. 25, but if you have a Breeze Card, it is Rs. 20.

== Route ==
The Orange Line goes from Board Office to Orangi town till TMO office, spanning about 4.0 kilometres (2.5 mi). The line carries around 3,000 passengers daily with a station after every kilometre. Three of the four stations are at ground level, while one is elevated. Each station is 6 metres (19.7 ft) wide and 70 metres (230 ft) long.

== See also ==
- Karachi Breeze
  - Green Line (Karachi Breeze)
- Lahore Metrobus
- Rawalpindi-Islamabad Metrobus
- Multan Metrobus
- Peshawar Metrobus
