= CDIA =

CDIA may refer to:

- Cities Development Initiative for Asia
- Chengdu International Airport
  - Chengdu Shuangliu International Airport
  - Chengdu Tianfu International Airport
- Consumer Data Industry Association
