= List of rapid transit systems in Pakistan =

The following is a list of rapid transit systems in Pakistan:

== Bus rapid transit ==
System	City	Region	Opening Year	System Length (km)	No of Stations (Note: Stations connected by transfers are counted as one station, unless otherwise noted.)	Notes
Lahore Metrobus	Lahore	Punjab	2013	27	27	Operational
Rawalpindi-Islamabad Metrobus	Rawalpindi and Islamabad	Punjab and Islamabad Capital Territory	2015	83.6	52	Operational
Multan Metrobus	Multan	Punjab	2016	18.5	21	Operational
TransPeshawar	Peshawar	Khyber Pakhtunkhwa	2020	27	32	Operational
Karachi Breeze	Karachi	Sindh	2021	21	22	Operational
Faisalabad Metrobus	Faisalabad	Punjab	2026	70	71	Under Construction
Gujranwala Metrobus	Gujranwala	Punjab	2026	31.2	28	Under Construction

== Rail rapid transit ==
System	City	State	Opening Year	System Length (km)			No of Lines (Note: Indicates lines that are in operation for operational systems, lines that are under construction for under construction systems and proposed lines for proposed systems.)	No of Stations (Note: Indicates stations that are in operation for operational systems, stations that are under construction for under construction systems and proposed stations for proposed systems.)	Gauge	Traction	Notes
System	City	State	Opening Year	IO (Note: In Operation - The length of the system currently in operation.)	UC (Note: Under construction - The length of the system currently under construction.)	Planned (Note: Planned - The length of the system currently planned to be built, but construction has not yet started.)	No of Lines	No of Stations	Gauge	Traction	Notes
Lahore Metro	Lahore	Punjab	2020	27.1	0	54.9	1	26	1,435 mm (4 ft 8 1/2 in) standard gauge	750 V DC Third Rail	Operational

== See also ==
- List of bus rapid transit systems
- List of rapid transit systems
- Transport in Pakistan
