= TransPeshawar =

Bus rapid transit system in Peshawar, Pakistan

TransPeshawar زو پېښور

Overview
- System: Greater Peshawar Region Mass Transit
- Operator: Government of Khyber Pakhtunkhwa; Government of Pakistan
- Vehicle: 244 Hybrid electric bus
- Status: Operational
- Began service: August 13, 2020; 6 years ago

Routes
- Routes: 16
- Locale: Peshawar, Khyber Pakhtunkhwa, Pakistan
- Start: Chamkani, Peshawar
- End: Karkhano
- Stations: 30

Service
- Daily ridership: 329,000+ (2024)
- Ridership: 80 million (2023)

TransPeshawar or Zu Peshawar is a bus rapid transit system in Peshawar, capital of Pakistan's Khyber Pakhtunkhwa (KP) province. TransPeshawar BRT system consists of two parts: the first encompasses an east–west corridor served by 30 stations on a dedicated lane for exclusive use by buses, while the second part consists of a network of feeder routes in which buses can enter and exit the system to travel on city streets. The system was inaugurated on 13 August 2020, and is the fourth BRT system in Pakistan.

== History ==
In 2013, the Government of Khyber Pakhtunkhwa requested technical support from the Cities Development Initiative for Asia to improve Peshawar's chaotic, mismanaged, and dilapidated urban transportation network. In 2017, the CDIA completed the Urban Transport Pre-Feasibility Study that devised a 20-year urban transport plan, with a 10-year action plan. The CDIA studied two corridors, an east–west corridor, and a north–south corridor and recommended that the east–west corridor be constructed first, along Peshawar's east–west axis along the Grand Trunk Road. Construction of the project, under the Peshawar Development Authority (PDA), began in 2017, and was executed by the Peshawar Development Authority. The system was inaugurated in August 2020.

== Features ==
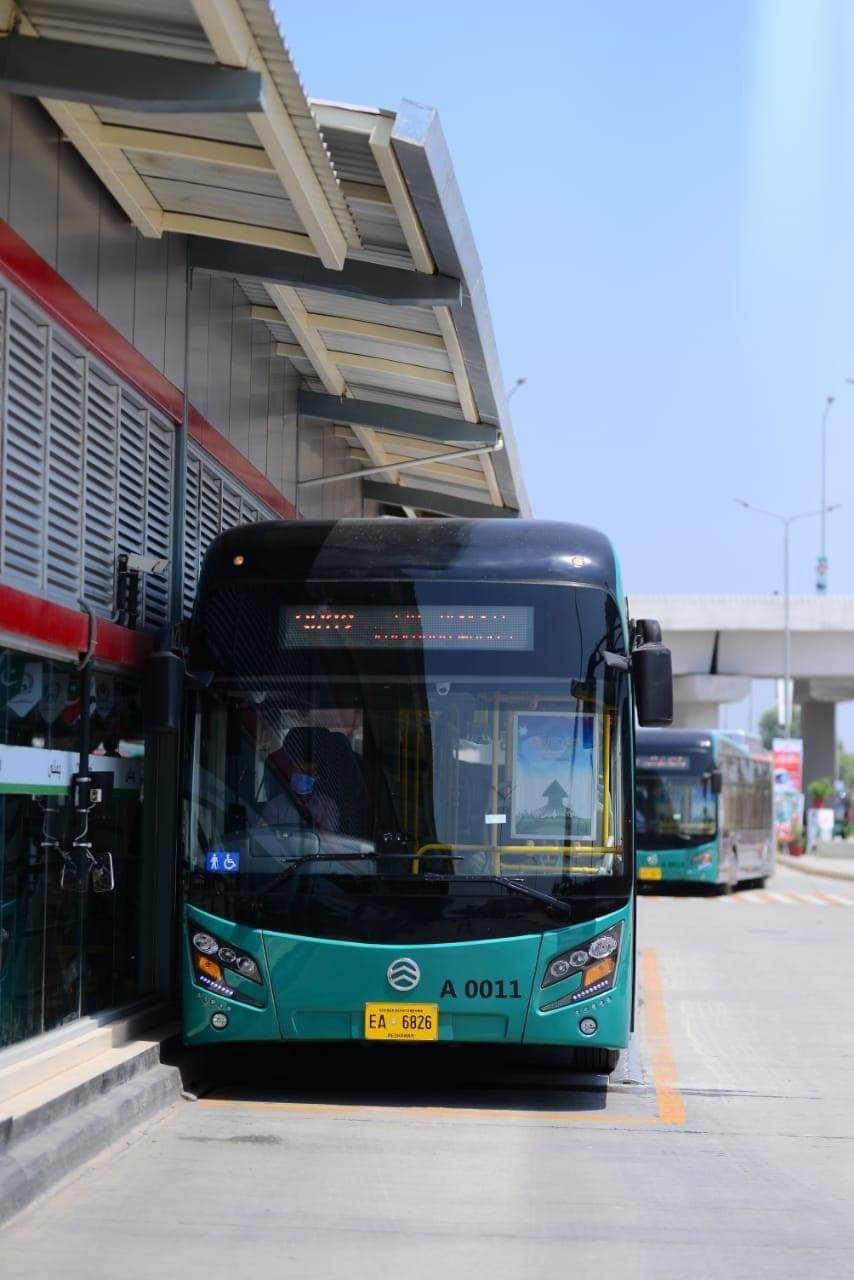
TransPeshawar buses use their own dedicated lane to serve 30 stations

TransPeshawar's first phase consists of an east–west busway which stretches from Chamkani in the east end to the Karkhano market in the west end of Peshawar. Feeder routes will also allow buses to enter/exit the system from city streets with mixed traffic.

=== Route ===
The core system has 30 stations and is mostly elevated (around 49%) while 38% is at grade, and 17% in underpasses. The line has 3.4 kilometers of underpasses, 10.5 kilometers at grade, and 13.7 kilometers elevated. The entire busway is fenced to prevent unauthorized pedestrian crossings, and to prevent vehicular traffic from entering. Stairs, elevators and bridges were built to allow pedestrians to cross the BRT corridor.

=== Buses ===
TransPeshawar was originally planned to use a fleet of 255 buses, of which 155 will be 12 meter-long buses, while 65 will be 18 meter-long articulated buses. The articulated buses will run only within the Service route/within corridor while the 12 meter-long buses will run in primarily in the Feeder system. Buses arrive every 3 minutes during peak hours, and every 5 minutes during non-peak hours.

The buses are low-entry, which allow easy entry and disembarkation from the doorways, especially for patrons using wheelchairs. Each bus provides free Wi-Fi services for passengers, while stations have toilet facilities. Buses are diesel-electric Plug-In Hybrids, which allow them to have improved overall fuel economy and lower emissions, and charging stations allow for recharging of batteries. All buses are environmentally friendly, and aim to reduce emissions and pollution in Peshawar.

Buses are supplied by Xiamen Golden Dragon Bus Co., Ltd. The tender allowed for a variation of +/-30% in the quantity of buses, thus as a start the contract has been signed for the supply of 155 units of 12-meter buses and 65 units of 18-meter articulated buses for a total value of PKR 5.478 billion. The provision to increase the quantity of buses to a maximum of 388 buses (+30% of 299) may be done depending on passenger numbers.

=== Stations ===
TransPeshawar's 30 stations feature passing lanes at each station, allowing the function of a "direct service" system in which buses from suburban areas can access TransPeshawar's dedicated bus-lanes for use as an express service directly to the city's centre. Each station is on average 850 metres from the previous station, with an estimated travel time of 2 minutes between adjacent stations. Stations, unlike the buses themselves, are not air conditioned.

=== Feeder system ===
The TransPeshawar system in phase 2 is complemented by a feeder system consisting of 8 routes extending 68 kilometres. Feeder buses use dedicated BRT lanes as needed before exiting the system and entering onto city streets as on-street bus service. The feeder routes add an additional 100 stops along those feeder lines, all of which will be new construction. Feeder stations are spaced approximately 300–500 metres from one another.

== Construction ==
The east–west corridor was completed in 3 phases:

- Phase 1: Chamkani to Balahisar Fort
- Phase 2: Balahisar Fort to Aman Chowk
- Phase 3: Aman Chowk to Karkhano Market

The entire road structure along the east–west corridor will also be reconstructed, and will include a new bicycle lane. The number of traffic lanes along the GT Road will also be reduced, leading to what will be intended as a more pedestrian-friendly street.

Project construction was launched in November 2017, and is being built concurrent to the Peshawar Ring Road, which will redirect heavy vehicles away from the city centre. The project civil engineering and physical layout were executed by a consortium of domestic engineering firms, including Maqbool Associates and Calsons, while construction supervision and on-site project management were led by MM Pakistan (MMP).

== Fares ==
Fares are to collected via an automated ticketing system that is also intended to be used on all city routes. On typical buses in Peshawar, fares are collected by bus operators. With implementation of the automated ticketing system, TransPeshawar bus operators will not collect fares. The minimum cost for a ticket will be 10 Rupees whereas the highest costing ticket will be 50 Rupees.

== Financing ==
The project was built with assistance from the Asian Development Bank. It was initially projected to cost Rs. 41 billion (US$150 million), but its final estimated cost is approximately Rs. 71 billion (US$250 million). The provincial government will borrow Rs. 48.18 billion (US$170 million) for the project, The system is the most expensive BRT system in Pakistan, though the provincial government argues that similar systems in Islamabad and Lahore actually cost Rs. 44.31 billion (US$160 million) and Rs. 59.65 billion (US$210 million) respectively. The Khyber Pakhtunkhwa government claims include costs of parallel roadworks project undertaken with the construction of the metro such as the Model town underpass in Lahore and the Cloverleaf interchange in Rawalpindi were not included in the total costs of those systems. It means if these prices are included, the total cost of these three transit systems are almost the same.

== Corruption Allegations and Criticism ==
During the Pakistan General Elections in 2018, allegations were raised against the KPK government by an engineer who resigned and claimed corruption in the project resulting in it being delayed. The General Manager (Operations) Tariq Mehmood rejected the allegations and said the assistant resident engineer was sacked from his job due to his ‘poor performance’ and ‘incompetence’.

In March/April 2019, under the orders and directions of Chief Minister Mahmood Khan Khyber-Pakhtunkhwa conducted an inquiry on Bus Rapid Transit (BRT) project. The provincial inspection team submitted a detailed report on the Bus Rapid Transit (BRT) project with an estimate that ‘some people’ allegedly received kickbacks totaling around Rs. 7 billion. The team had found that the project was constructed without proper planning and showed its concerns about faulty planning and poor management. However, KP CM criticized the inspection team for making Peshawar BRT report public and stated that flaws will be fixed, but rejected allegations of traffic bottlenecks caused by the operation of BRT project. The principal engineer of the project Gul Hameed Khalil dubbed the inquiry report as unrealistic and said: "that the contracts of the project were awarded under Asian development bank". Asian Development Bank also defended BRT Peshawar and termed it as transparent, also stated that the companies shortlisted for the project are done by the bank and not the provincial government.

== Incidents and problems ==
During its operations, BRT reported multiple instances of bus catching fire; in the first instance a bus caught fire in August 2020. In other instances three other buses also reportedly caught fire. BRT Bus service was temporary suspended for technical review and to correct the fault. It was reported that there was a technical fault in the controller installed between the switching point of hybrid batteries and electric motors. After inspection, the fault was fixed on all buses, and the service was resumed.

== See also ==
- Peshawar Circular Railway
- Karachi Circular Railway
- Karachi Metrobus
- Lahore Metrobus
- Multan Metrobus
- Rawalpindi-Islamabad Metrobus
