= Multan Metrobus =

Public rapid transit system in Pakistan

Overview
- System: Lahore Metrobus
- Operator: Government of Punjab, Pakistan; Government of Pakistan
- Began service: January 24, 2017; 9 years ago

Route
- Route type: Bus rapid transit
- Locale: Multan, Punjab, Pakistan,
- Start: Bahauddin Zakariya University Terminal
- End: Kumharanwala Chowk Terminal
- Stops: 21

The Multan Metrobus is a bus rapid transit (BRT) system in Multan, Punjab, Pakistan. Construction work on the line began in May 2015, while operations commenced on 24 January 2017. It was the third BRT project in Pakistan, after the Lahore Metrobus and the Rawalpindi-Islamabad Metrobus.

== Design ==
The Multan Metro route is 18.5 kilometres (11.5 mi) long, with a 12.5 kilometres (7.8 mi) elevated section. It has 21 bus stations, with 14 elevated stations and seven ground-level stations. The bus stations have been constructed with Multan's extreme hot and cold weather in mind. Each bus, typically, can carry 190 passengers. A private company will run the bus service for the time being.

Nearly 96,000 commuters are expected to use Multan Metrobus service every day. The official reports reported cost of Rs.29 billion for 18.5 kilometres (11.5 mi), making it Rs.1.61 billion per kilometre.

== Operational problems of project ==
Multan Metrobus service was started with 47 buses. However, the service was unable to meet its target of 90,000+ passengers. After experiencing losses, ten buses were sent to the Lahore Metrobus project. Nevertheless, the remaining 37 buses were still unable to attain viable passengers. To prevent the service from collapsing, 19 buses were parked and strength was reduced to 18.

Furthermore, 100 more feeder bus services were bought in the first phase, feeding passengers to the remaining 18 buses from far-flung areas. Later, 100 more buses were imported to make a total of 200, accommodating all possible routes in Multan. Afterward, Speedo buses were also reduced from 200 to 115 after a few months attributed to empty buses and lack of public interest. Despite all measures taken by the Punjab government, the project sustained high annual losses due to the subsidized rate provided in the project. Several reasons for the failure of the project included:

- Poor route planning and design of the project.
- Difficult ticketing systems i.e. the electronic card used in the project and expensive card load requirements.
- Qinqi rickshaws operating on same routes as the metro bus are cheaper and quicker.

== Allegation and probe ==
An alleged scandal emerged on 29 January 2015, after Chinese firm Yabaite-China associated a huge amount of money in their accounts, flowing from the Pakistan-associated Multan metro project. It was revealed in an allegedly $17.5 million corruption scandal that a construction contract was awarded to Habib Rafiq Private Limited. Some part of the project was outsourced to Capital Engineering, a company owned by Faisal Subhan (alleged frontman of the Sharif family). Capital Engineering allegedly made suspicious deals with Jiangsu Yabaite Technology Co. Ltd, which possibly have provided a kickback to the former Chief Minister of Punjab, Shehbaz Sharif. However, Sharif outrightly rejected the allegations and termed Faisal Subhan as a fictitious character. "I have done no corruption, I am ready for any probe", he added.

Despite all allegations, Zafar Hijazi, ex-chairman Securities and Exchange Commission of Pakistan (SECP), refused to forward the case to FIA and start an inquiry against capital international or Yabaite China. However, after Hijazi was arrested in a record tampering case in August 2017, SECP finally moved the money laundering cases against Chinese firm to FIA. In October 2017, the Senate standing committee of finance noted serious reservations on corruption scam in Multan metro. It was noted that Hijazi, who changed the record for the Sharif family, held the Multan metro corruption cases and impeded its referral to FIA, raising further suspicions. Multan metro initiated the first ever high-profile money laundering case against any Chinese firm.

After the Senate committee took up the case of Multan metro corruption, and SECP referred the associated money laundering case in October 2017, NAB finally took notice of the mega corruption scandal and ordered a probe into misappropriate of funds and use of substandard materials. In February 2018, NAB finally started the proceedings after long controversies and delays. Nadir Chatta, the Deputy Commissioner of Multan, faced interrogation from NAB on violation or procedures while purchase of land. However, on 31 August 2017, acting Chinese ambassador, Zhao Lijian, rejected the allegations by saying that Yabaite was not operating in Pakistan.

== See also ==
- Rapid transit in Pakistan
- Lahore Metrobus
- Rawalpindi-Islamabad Metrobus
- Karachi Metrobus
- TransPeshawar
