= Green Line (Karachi Breeze) =

Pakistani bus route in Karachi, opened 2021

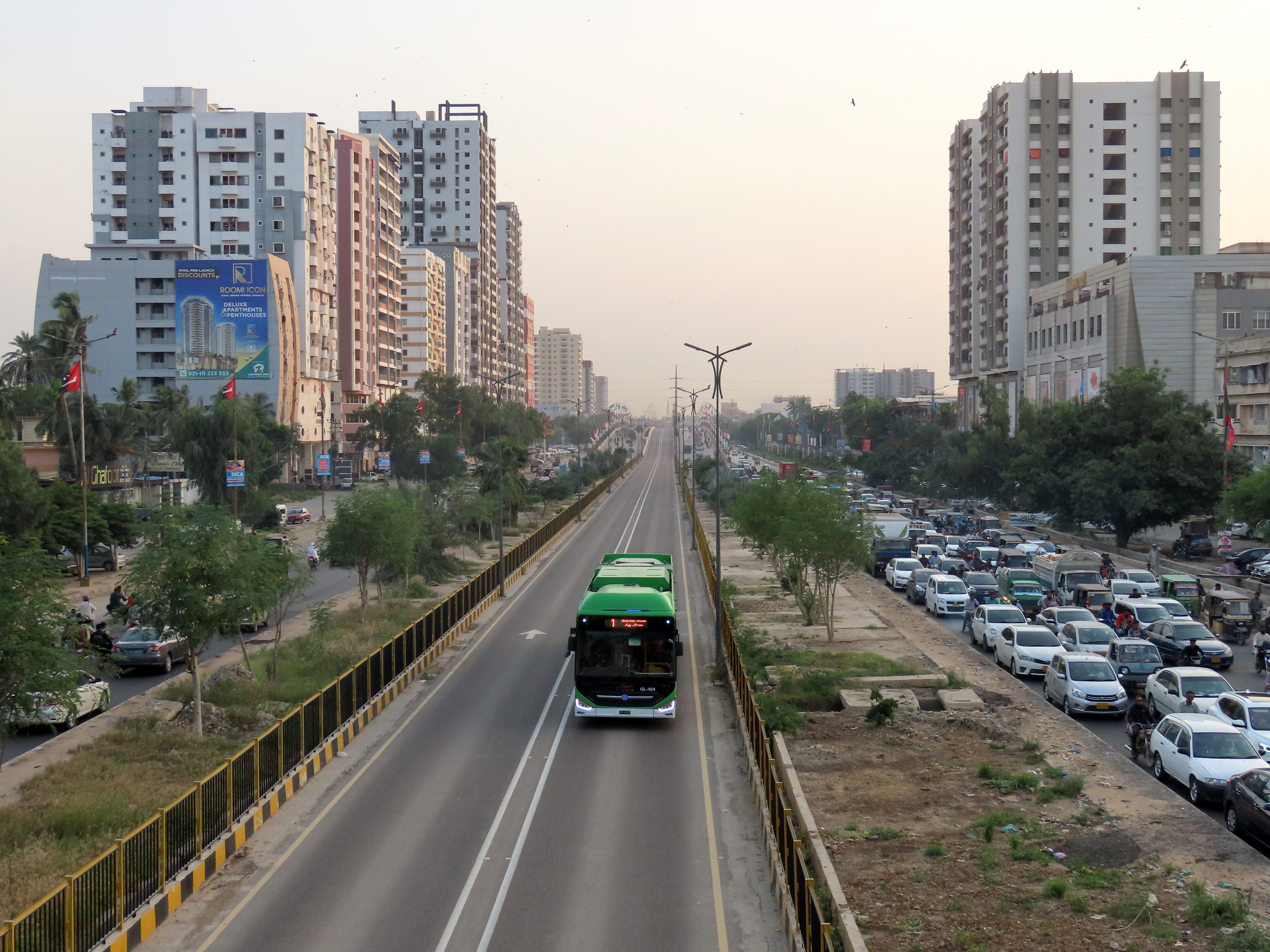
- Greenline passing through North Nazimabad

Overview
- System: Karachi Metrobus
- Operator: Government of Sindh; Government of Pakistan
- Vehicle: 80 Hybrid electric bus
- Status: In service
- Began service: 25 December 2021; 4 years ago

Route
- Route type: Bus rapid transit
- Locale: Karachi, Sindh, Pakistan
- Start: Numaish Chowrangi
- Via: Shahrah-e-Usman
- End: Surjani Town
- Stops: 22

Service
- Frequency: One bus every three minutes
- Daily ridership: 55,000

The Green Line (Urdu: سبز راہ) is a bus rapid transit (BRTS) line of the Karachi Breeze metrobus system, operational since December 2021 in Karachi, Sindh, Pakistan. Its construction began in February 2016 on the orders of the then Prime Minister Nawaz Sharif. Being stalled for years, it was then completed by the orders of Prime Minister Imran Khan. The 18 km (11.2 mi) busway is the first phase of the Karachi Metrobus network and has 22 stations (a station after every km). The Green Line was expected to be functional by November 2021 and to have a fleet of 80 buses operated by Daewoo. So far, 80 buses for the project have reached from China at the Karachi Port. Speaking at the ceremony held to celebrate the arrival of buses in Karachi, Federal Planning and Development Minister Asad Umar said, "The proper commercial operation of the Green Line bus service would begin in Karachi by 25 December 2021 after completion of the trials". Buses were purchased from Foton Motor.

== Route ==
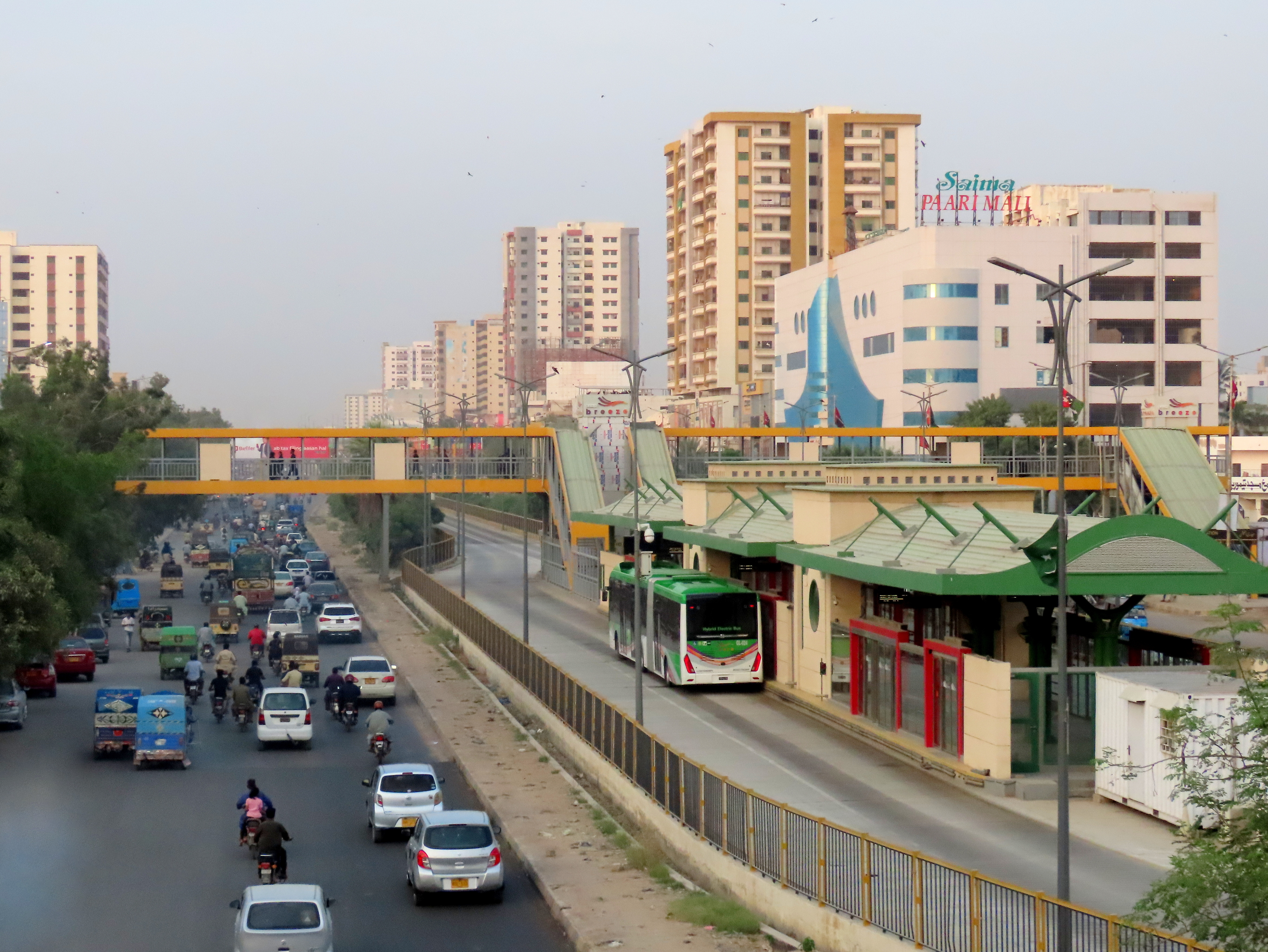
Hyderi Station in North Nazimabad

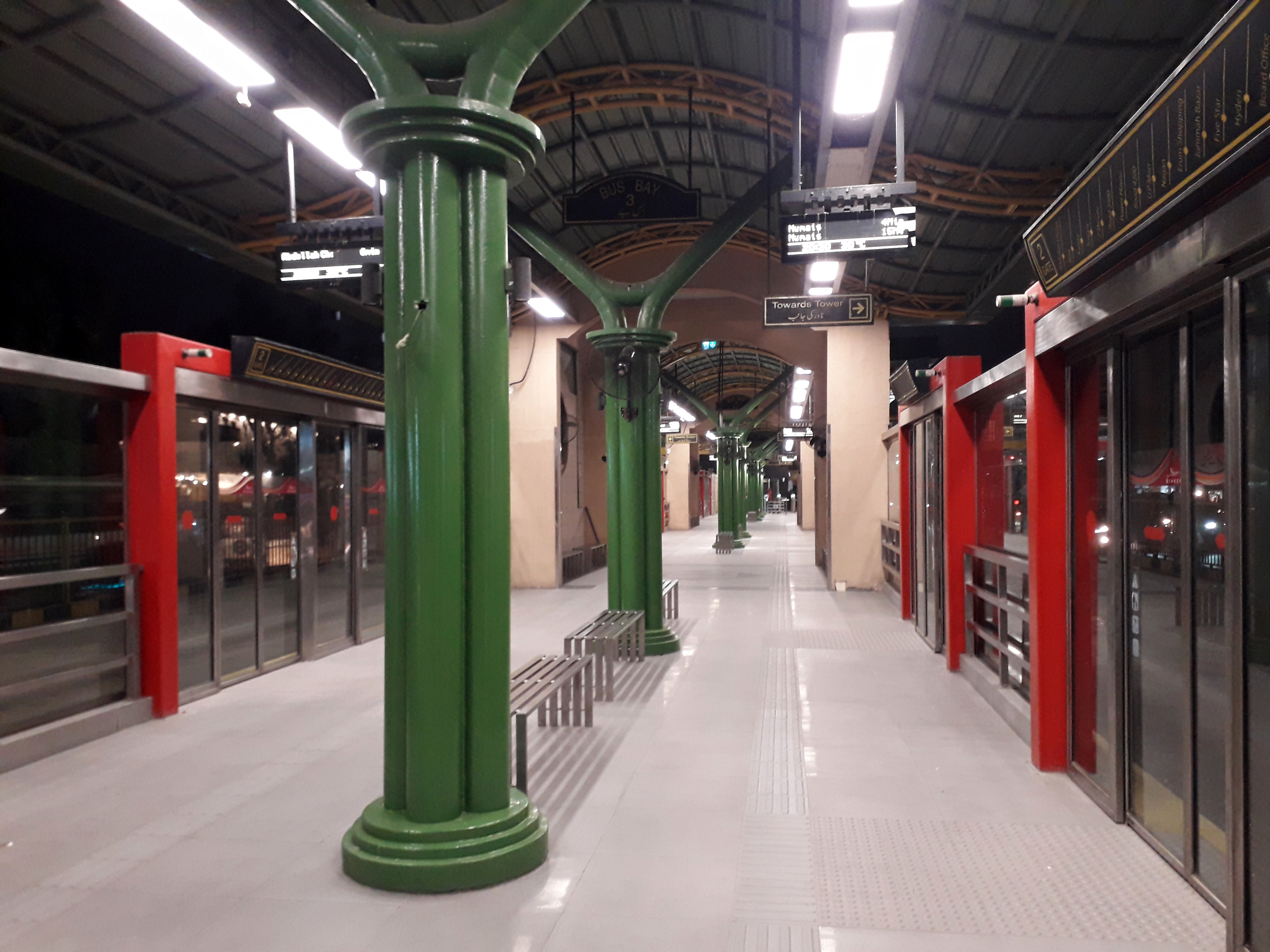
Interior of a Green Line station

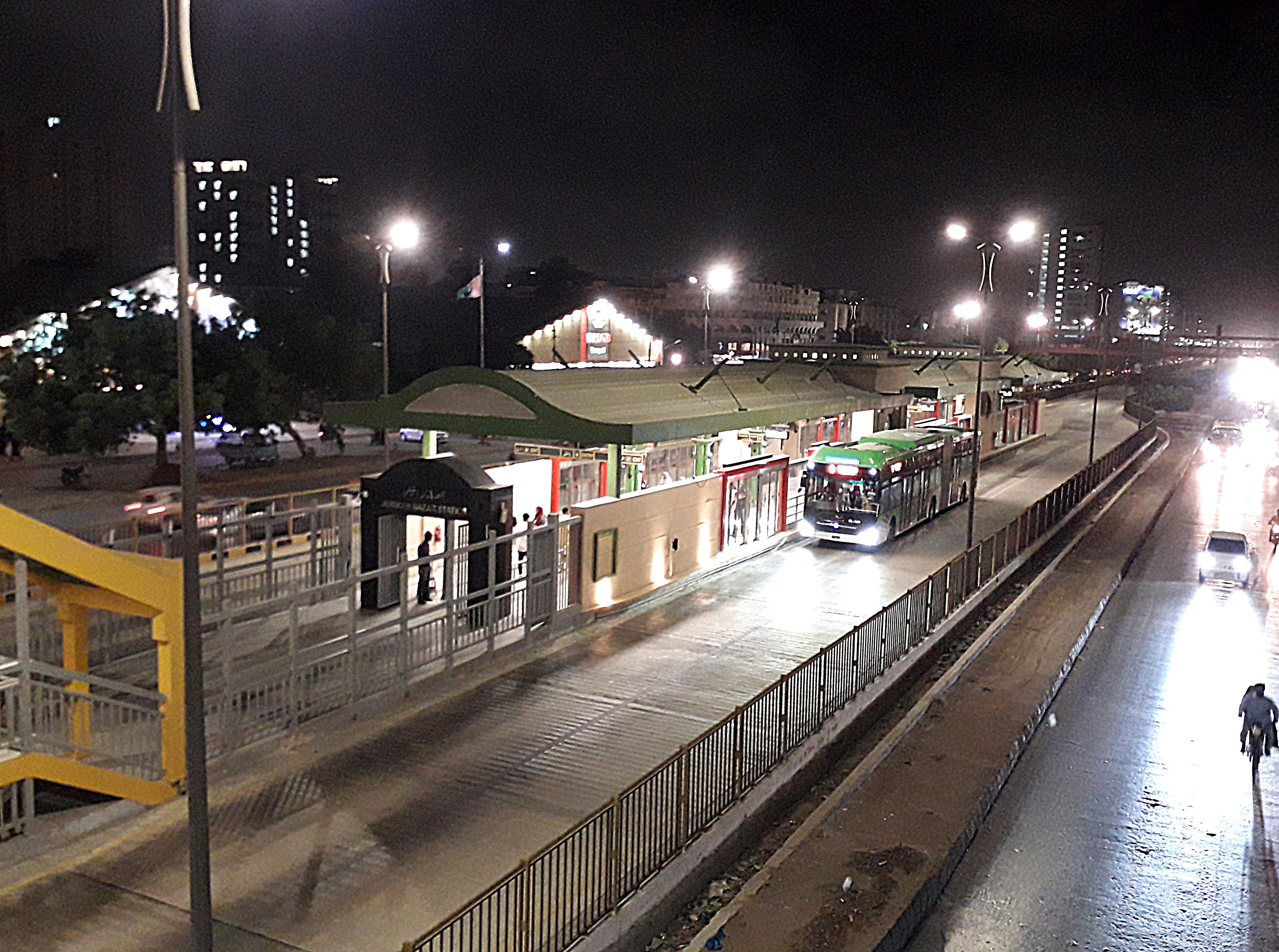
Station at night

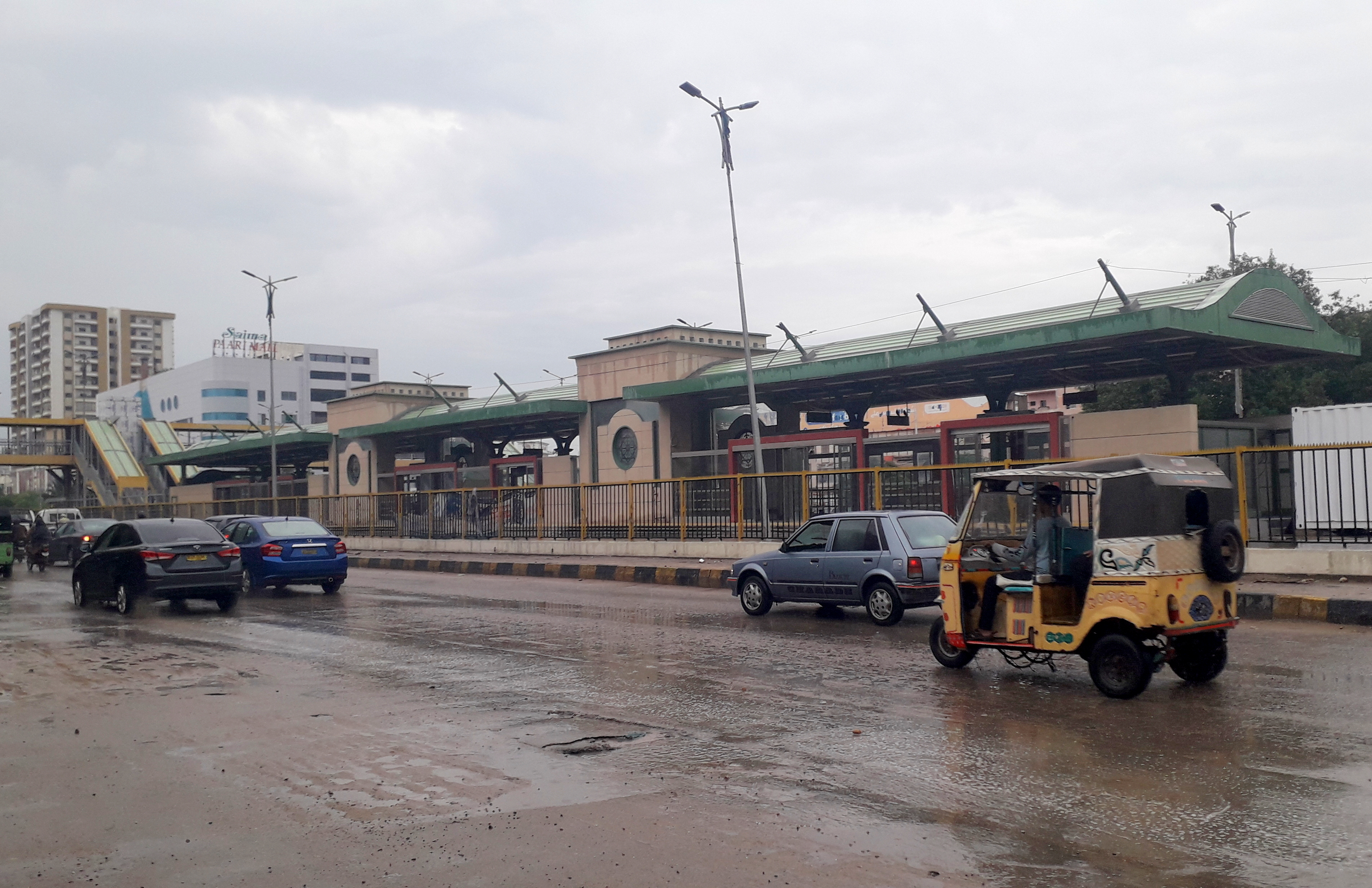
A station in North Nazimabad

The route of Green Line is mentioned Below:

Common Corridor Stations (Connected To Other BRTS Lines):

- Jama Cloth Station (Under Construction)
- Electronic Market Station (Under Construction)
- Saddar Station (Under Construction)
- Sea Breeze Station or Sub Numaish Station (Under Construction)
- Numaish Station

Green Line Specific Stations:

- Patel Para (Guru Mandir) Station
- Lasbela Chowk Station
- Sanitary Market (Gulbahar) Station
- Nazimabad No.1 Station
- Enquiry Office Station
- Annu Bhai Park Station
- Board Office Station (to Orange Line)
- Hyderi Station
- Five Star Chowrangi Station
- Jummah Bazaar (Bayani Center) Station
- Erum Shopping Mall (Shadman No.2) Station
- Nagan Chowrangi Station
- U.P. More Station
- Road 4200 (Saleem Centre) Station
- Power House Chowrangi Station
- Road 2400 (Aisha Complex) Station
- 2 Minute Chowrangi Station
- Surjani Chowrangi (4K) Station
- Karimi Chowrangi Station
- KDA Flats Station
- Abdullah Chowk Station

== Financing and construction ==
The Government of Pakistan financed the majority of the project. Engineering Associates were contracted as the designers and supervision consultants for Green Line while Think Transportation was contracted as urban engineering consultants.

On 10 December 2021, Prime Minister Imran Khan formally inaugurated the Green Line Bus Rapid Transit project. He announced that "commercial operations will begin on 25 December and total operations will start by 10 January (2022)". Limited operations began from 25 December 2021, with only 11 out of the 22 stations operational (1 station operational per 2 kilometres). The project started its full operations from 10 January 2022, as announced.

A Spanish Firm Grupsa which provided platform screen doors for the Project, approached Pakistani Anti-corruption agencies for over invoicing its services. It claimed that a Pakistani contractor was embezzling funds.

== See also ==
- Karachi Breeze Project
- Karachi Circular Railway
- Transport in Karachi
- Karachi Breeze
  - Orange Line (Karachi Breeze)
