= Cities Development Initiative for Asia =

Cities Development Initiative for Asia (CDIA)
- Formation: 19 October 2007
- Type: Regional Development Programme
- Purpose: Technical Assistance
- Headquarters: Pasig, Metro Manila, Philippines
- Region served: Asia-Pacific
- Members: ADB; Germany; Sweden; Austria; Shanghai
- Main organ: Program Review Committee
- Staff: 13 International; 11 National
- Website: http://www.cdia.asia

Cities Development Initiative for Asia (CDIA) is a multi-donor trust fund managed by the Asian Development Bank.

== History ==
On February 5–6, 2007, more than 190 representatives from national and local governments of 23 countries, as well as civil society, private sector, international organizations, and donors attended the International Conference on "Investing in Asia's Urban Future" in Manila, Philippines to determine how new approaches can be used to better the lives of 1.6 billion people in Asian cities.

From this event, the Cities Development Initiative for Asia (CDIA) was co-founded initially as a partnership between the Asian Development Bank (ADB) and the German Federal Ministry for Economic Cooperation and Development (BMZ) in October 2007.

Since that time, the program has welcomed the participation of others as funding members:

2008 - The Government of Sweden
2009 - The Government of Switzerland
2011 - The Government of Austria
2011 - The Shanghai Municipal Government

== Members ==
- Asian Development Bank (ADB)
- French Development Agency (AFD)
- European Union
- German Federal Ministry for Economic Cooperation and Development (BMZ)
- Swedish International Development Cooperation Agency
- Ministry of Finance, Austria
- The Government of Spain
- State Secretariat for Economic Affairs (Switzerland)
- The Shanghai Municipal Government

== Partners ==
- United Nations Economic and Social Commission for Asia and the Pacific
- Ministry of Foreign Affairs (Singapore)
- United Nations Human Settlements Programme
- ICLEI
