= Karkhano =

Market area in Peshawar, Pakistan

Karkhano Market کارخانو بازار
- Bazaar
- Location in Khyber Pakhtunkhwa
- Coordinates: 34.00160643939962°N 71.42247924187079°E
- Country: Pakistan
- Province: Khyber Pakhtunkhwa
- City: Peshawar
- Established: 1985
- Area code: 25000

Karkhano (Pashto: کارخانو) is a market area on the western side of Peshawar, Khyber Pakhtunkhwa, Pakistan. Located in the Hayatabad suburb of the city, it is near the Khyber District, which in turn borders Afghanistan. Karkhano is considered to be the largest business hub in Peshawar.

Established in 1985, it had around 22 shopping plazas containing 5,000 to 7,000 shops in its heyday, owned by Pashtun traders. The name Kārkhānō means "industries" in the Pashto language.

== History ==
Since its inception, the market has been infamous for the availability of smuggled goods and a variety of drugs. As it is situated close to Jamrud Tehsil of Khyber District, the Karkhano is prone to illegal trade of drugs, weapons, and goods, and the proliferation of terrorist activities.

In April 2015, the district administration conducted a clean-up operation against encroachments in the market, dismantling two-decade old structures consisting of about 760 shops, some cattle and vegetable markets, and illegal taxi stands. It was the third such operation in the area.

In tax year of 2018, the Karkhano market emerged as the fourth-highest tax contributor in the country, with 10,417 filers paying a total of Rs. 5.27 billion in taxes.

After the Fall of Kabul that led to the Taliban control of Afghanistan in 2021, the market has experienced a drastic decrease in the footfall of visiting customers. As a result, about half of the shops have been abandoned by their owners. Fear of the Taliban, an increase in the transportation costs of goods, a decrease in the purchasing power of the customers, increased border control measures, and a drying up of the supply of contraband are some of the reasons attributed to this decline in business activity in the Karkhano market.

== Goods ==
On the right side of the market are many industries that are located in the Hayatabad industrial estate. As the industries emerged in this area, so did these markets. The locals from Peshawar usually visit these markets because the prices are lower than those in other commercial parts of Peshawar. The Karkhano has also seen customers from the Punjab, who buy cheaper goods and sell them back in their province.

The market includes a large amount of contraband from smugglers. Many types of items are available, including electronics, shoes and clothing, household goods, luxury vehicles, cosmetics, toys, watches, cigarettes, and video games. The rising price of oil affected the amount of cheaper smuggled petrol sold in the market.

== Main markets of Karkhano ==
- United Plaza
- Shah Shopping Centre
- G.B Market
- Shaheen Market
- Ameen Market
- Sitara Market
- Al-Haj Market
- Diamond Market
- Kabul Shopping Plaza
- National Market
- Peerano Market
- Kabul Market
- Malak Taj Market
- Awami Market
- Khyber Market
- Shinwari Market
- S.S Plaza
- Royal Plaza
- Bejli Market
- Palace Market
- Khalid Shopping Plaza
- Afghan Market
- Hussain Market
- Makkah Market
- S.G Plaza
- Jan Plaza
- Afridi Plaza
- M.S Market
- Haroon Market
