= Shamspir =

Pakistani island

Native name: شمس پیر Nickname: Shamspeer
- Interactive map of Shamspir

Geography
- Location: Keamari District, Karachi, Sindh
- Coordinates: 24°50′35″N 66°55′10″E
- Archipelago: Kiamari archipelago
- Adjacent to: Arabian Sea
- Area: 0.65 km^{2} (0.25 sq mi)
- Highest elevation: 1 m (3 ft)

Administration
- Pakistan

Demographics
- Population: 5000 (2008)

Additional information
- Time zone: PST (UTC+5)

Shamspir (Urdu: شمس پیر) is a populated island off the coast of Karachi, Sindh, Pakistan. The village on the island, administratively part of Keamari District, is home to approximately 5,000 residents.

== Location ==
Located west of Karachi Harbour, north of Sandspit Beach, and west of Kakapir, the island was surrounded by dense mangrove forests until 2006. However, these forests have been significantly reduced over the past two decades within the harbour's ecosystem.

== History ==
Shamspir is named for the shrine of a saint, named Hazrat Sham Pir, located on the island. Shamspir is an old village which, like the nearby Baba and Bhit Islands, predates the formal establishment of Karachi. Residents from Baba and Bhit islands helped settle Shamspir. During the British era, some residents of Mithadar and Kharadar were settled in Shamspir during construction of the Port of Karachi. Some of those residents moved further west and established the fishing village of Kakapir.

== See also ==
- List of islands of Pakistan
