= Karachi Harbour =

Bay and estuary in Pakistan

- بندر کشتی کراچی
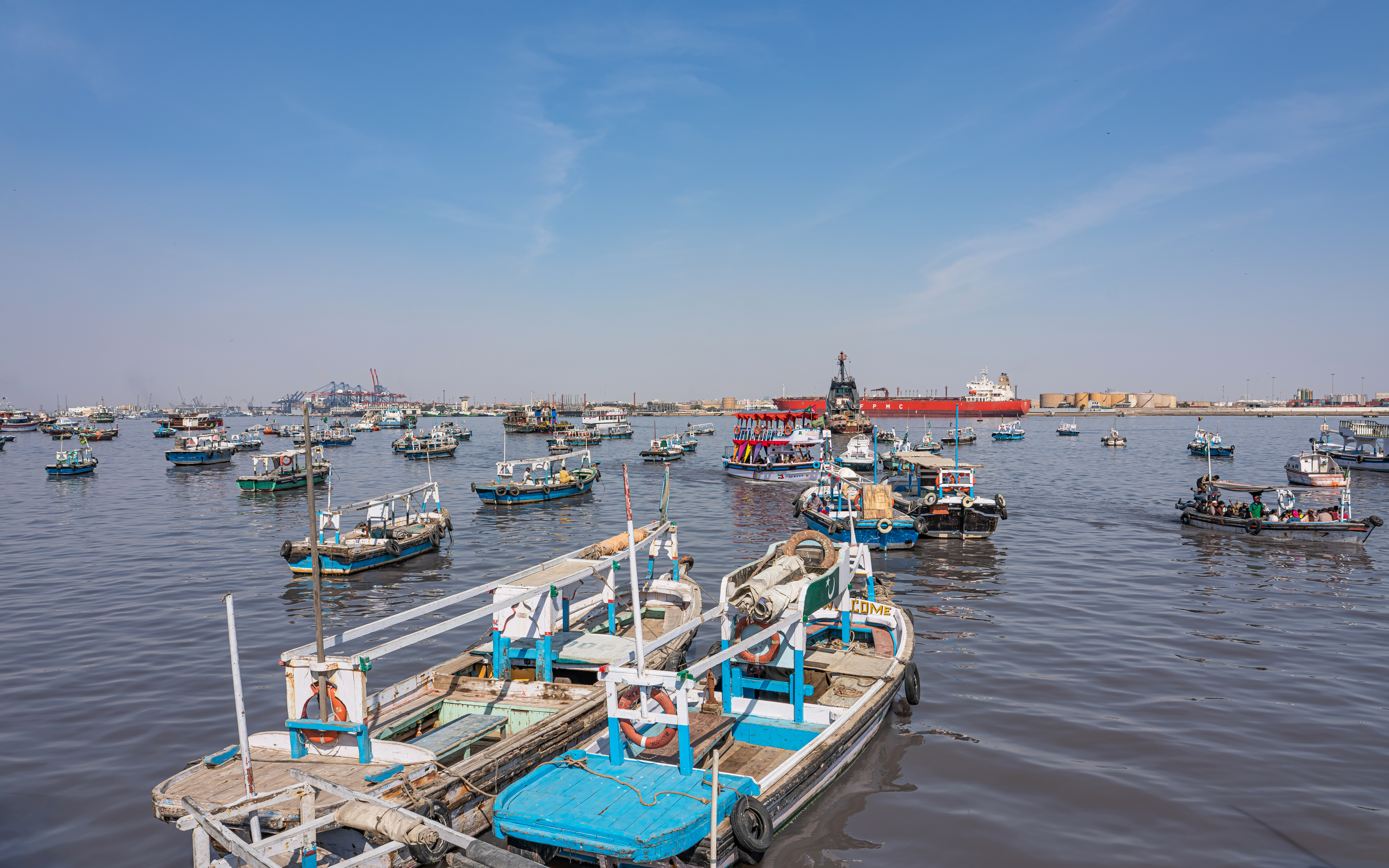
- A view of the harbour with the Port of Karachi visible

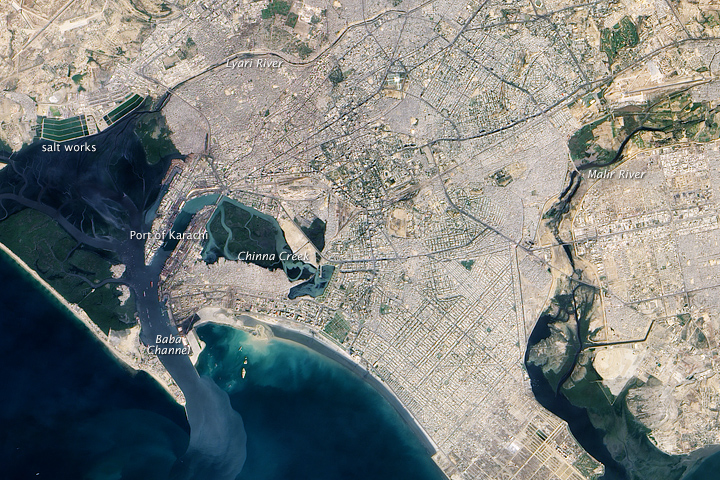

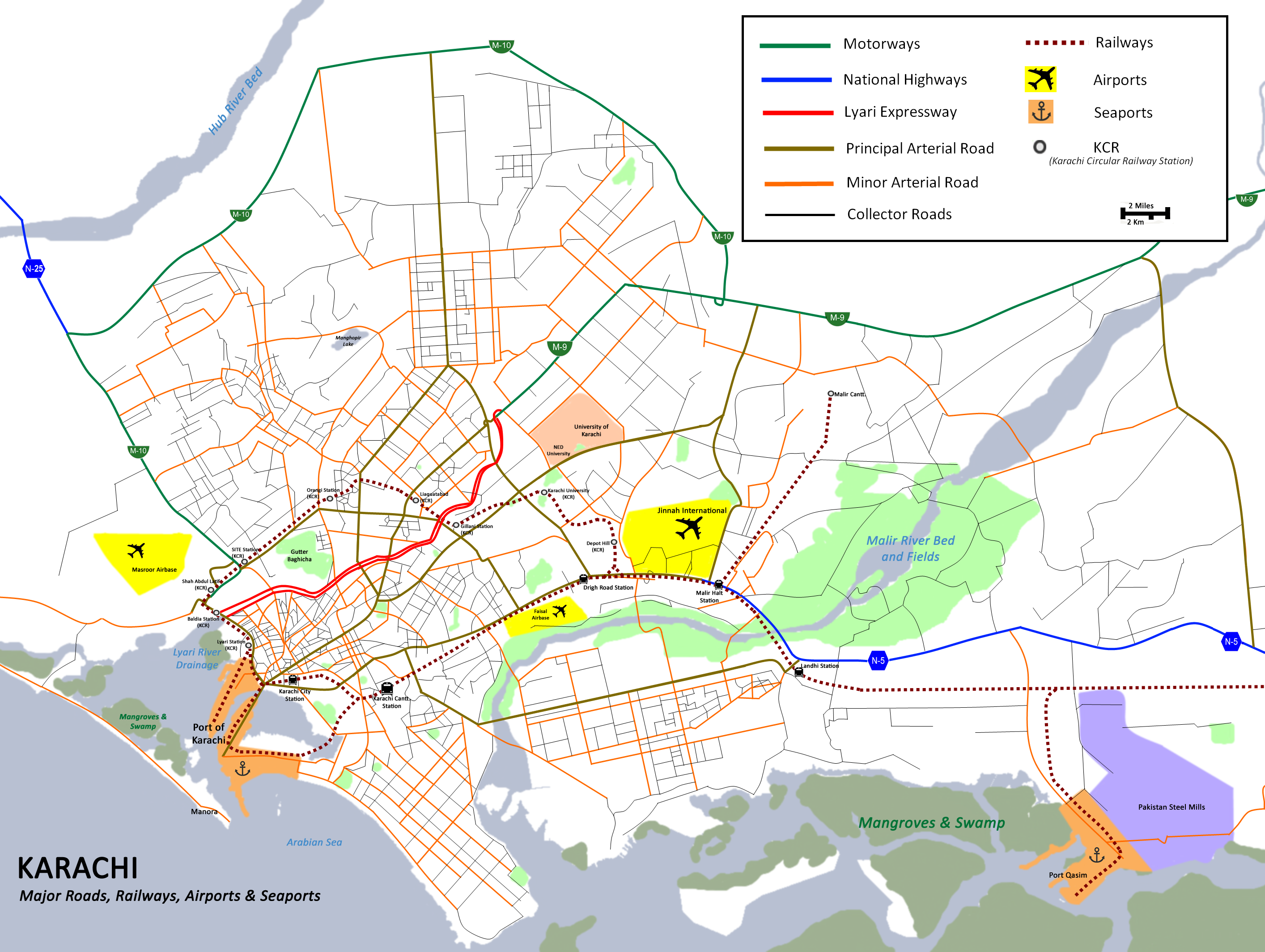
- Location within Karachi
- Location: Karachi, Pakistan
- Coordinates: 24°48′55.2″N 66°58′08.4″E
- River sources: Lyari River
- Ocean/sea sources: Arabian Sea
- Basin countries: Pakistan
- Islands: Baba and Bhit Islands
- Settlements: Baba and Bhit villages Karachi; Kakapir; Manora; Shamspir

Karachi Harbour is a narrow bay and river estuary located west of the Indus River Delta in Karachi, Pakistan. The harbour lies between the Lyari River delta and Chinna Creek to the north, and the Arabian Sea to the south. Since 1886, sections of the harbour have been improved to form the Port of Karachi - Pakistan's busiest seaport.

== Geography ==
The harbour is divided into an Upper and Lower Harbour, which together have a length of 11.5 kilometres (7.1 mi). The Upper Harbour has been developed into the Port of Karachi, and is located between the East and West Wharfs of the port, where it then goes on eastward to form a series of backwaters with thick mangrove forests known as Chinna Creek. Along the western edge of the West Wharf is a small local fishing harbour known as the Karachi Fish Harbour, built in 1958, and the delta of the Lyari River. The Lower Harbour, also known as Baba Channel, stretches from Manora and Keamari to the port, and serves as a shipping channel between the port and the Arabian Sea.

== History ==
Nearchus, who commanded Alexander the Great's naval fleet, mentioned a hilly island by the name of Morontobara and an adjacent flat island named Bibakta, which colonial historians identified as Karachi's Manora and Keamari (or Clifton), respectively, based on Greek descriptions. Both areas were island until well into the colonial era, when silting in led to them being connected to the mainland.

In 711 CE, Muhammad bin Qasim conquered the Sindh and Indus Valley and the port of Debal, from where he launched his forces further into the Indus Valley in 712. Some have identified the port with Karachi, though some argue the location was somewhere between Karachi and the nearby city of Thatta.

Under Mirza Ghazi Beg, the Mughal administrator of Sindh, the development of coastal Sindh and the Indus River Delta was encouraged. Under his rule, fortifications in the region acted as a bulwark against Portuguese incursions into Sindh. Karachi is also mentioned in the sixteenth century Turkish treatise Mir'ât ül Memâlik (Mirror of Countries, 1557) by the Ottoman captain Seydi Ali Reis, which warns sailors about whirlpools and advises them to seek safety in "Kaurashi" harbour if they found themselves drifting dangerously.

In 1728, heavy rains silted up the harbour at Kharak, forcing merchants to relocate to the area of modern Karachi. 19th-century Karachi historian Seth Naomal Hotchand recorded that a small settlement of 20–25 huts existed along the Karachi Harbour that was known as Dibro, which was situated along a pool of water known as Kolachi-jo-Kun. In 1725, a band of Balochi settlers from Makran and Kalat had settled in the hamlet after fleeing droughts and tribal feuds. A new settlement was built in 1729 at the site of Dibro, which came to be known as Kolachi-jo-Goth ("The village of Kolachi"), which grew into the modern city. The gate facing the sea was called "Kharadar" (salt gate), and the gate facing the Lyari River was called "Mithadar" (sweet gate). From 1729 to 1783 the strategic location of Kolachi saw the town change hands several times between the Khans of Kalat and the rulers of Sind. In 1783, after two prolonged sieges the town fell to the Talpur Mirs of Sind, who constructed a fort mounted with cannons on Manora island at the harbour entrance.

The British East India Company captured Karachi on 3 February 1839 after HMS Wellesley opened fire and quickly destroyed Manora Fort, which guarded Karachi Harbour at Manora Point. Karachi was recognized for its strategic importance, prompting the British to establish the Port of Karachi in 1854. Karachi rapidly became a transportation hub for British India, owing to the newly built port and rail infrastructure, as well as the increase in agricultural exports from the opening of productive tracts of newly irrigated land in Punjab and interior Sindh. At the outbreak of the American Civil War, Karachi Harbour became an important cotton-exporting port, with Indus Steam Flotilla and Orient Inland Steam Navigation Company established to transport cotton from interior Sindh to the harbour, and onwards to textile mills in England.

With the completion of the Suez Canal in 1869, Karachi's position as a major port increased even further. In 1878, the British Raj connected Karachi with the network of British India's vast railway system. In 1887, Karachi Port underwent radical improvements with connection to the railways, along with expansion and dredging of the port, and construction of a breakwater.

== Island settlements ==
Baba and Bhit Islands

Baba and Bhit are two small and densely populated islands located in the Karachi Harbor, near Karachi. The approximate area of the islands is 4 km² and the population is about 25,000. The islands are connected to Karachi via a ferry service to Keamari.

Kakapir

Kakapir is a fishing village in Karachi Harbour, 15 kilometers west of Karachi. It is located at the western end of Sandspit Beach, near Hawke's Bay Beach. Mauripur lies to its north. Kakapir is named for a saint, whose shrine is located in the village, who reportedly was known for his brown hair. The village is reportedly about 100 years old. Residents of the village were originally from the Mithadar and Kharadar neighborhoods of Karachi, which were settled by the British in Shams Pir during the construction of the Port of Karachi. Those residents migrated further west and established Kakapir.

Manora

Manora is a small peninsula that forms a protective barrier between Karachi Harbour to the north and the Arabian Sea to the south. Manora is a military town with a population of 4,273 (per the 2017 census). was formerly an island, but due to silting is now connected to the mainland by a 12 kilometres (7.5 mi) long natural sandbridge known as Sandspit. The entrance to Karachi was once guarded against pirate raids by the Manora Fort built in the 1790s, which was later upgraded by the British, and then the Pakistan Navy.

Shamspir

Shamspir is an island village near Karachi, Pakistan, along the western end of Karachi Harbour, close to Sandspit Beach and Kakapir. The village is bordered by thick Mangrove forests which grow in the harbor.

== Gallery ==
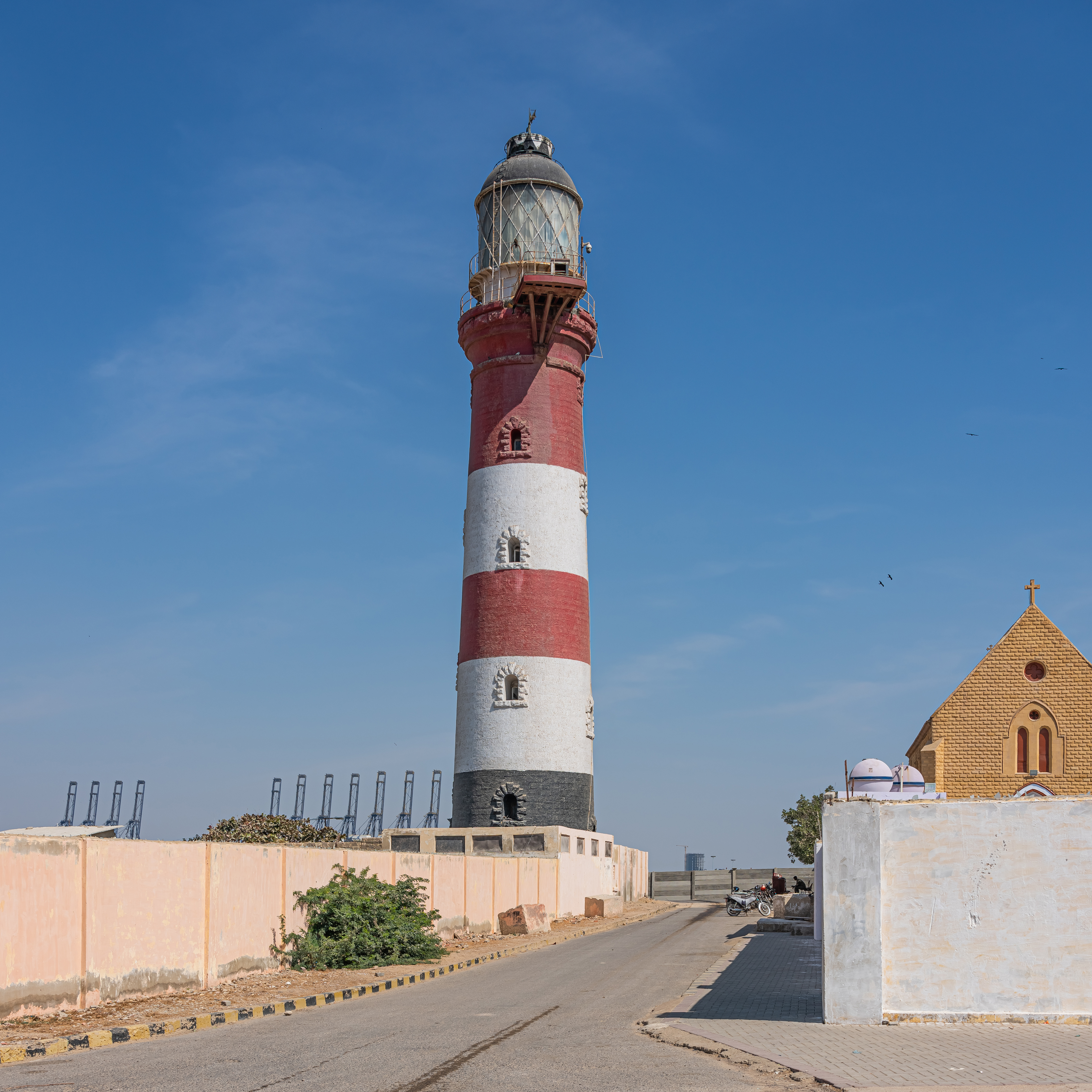
Manora Point Lighthouse at the entrance to the harbor

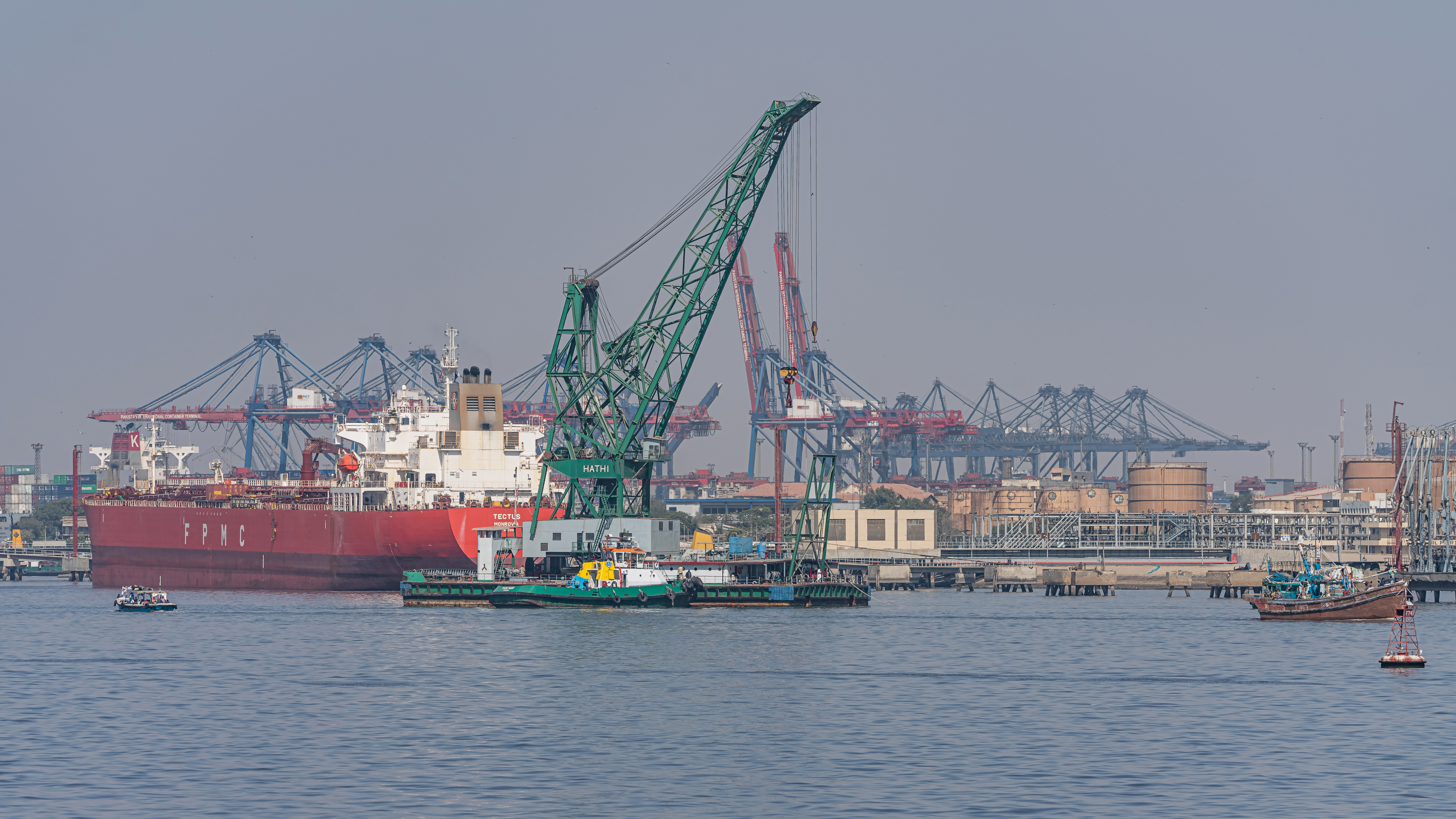
Cranes at the Port of Karachi

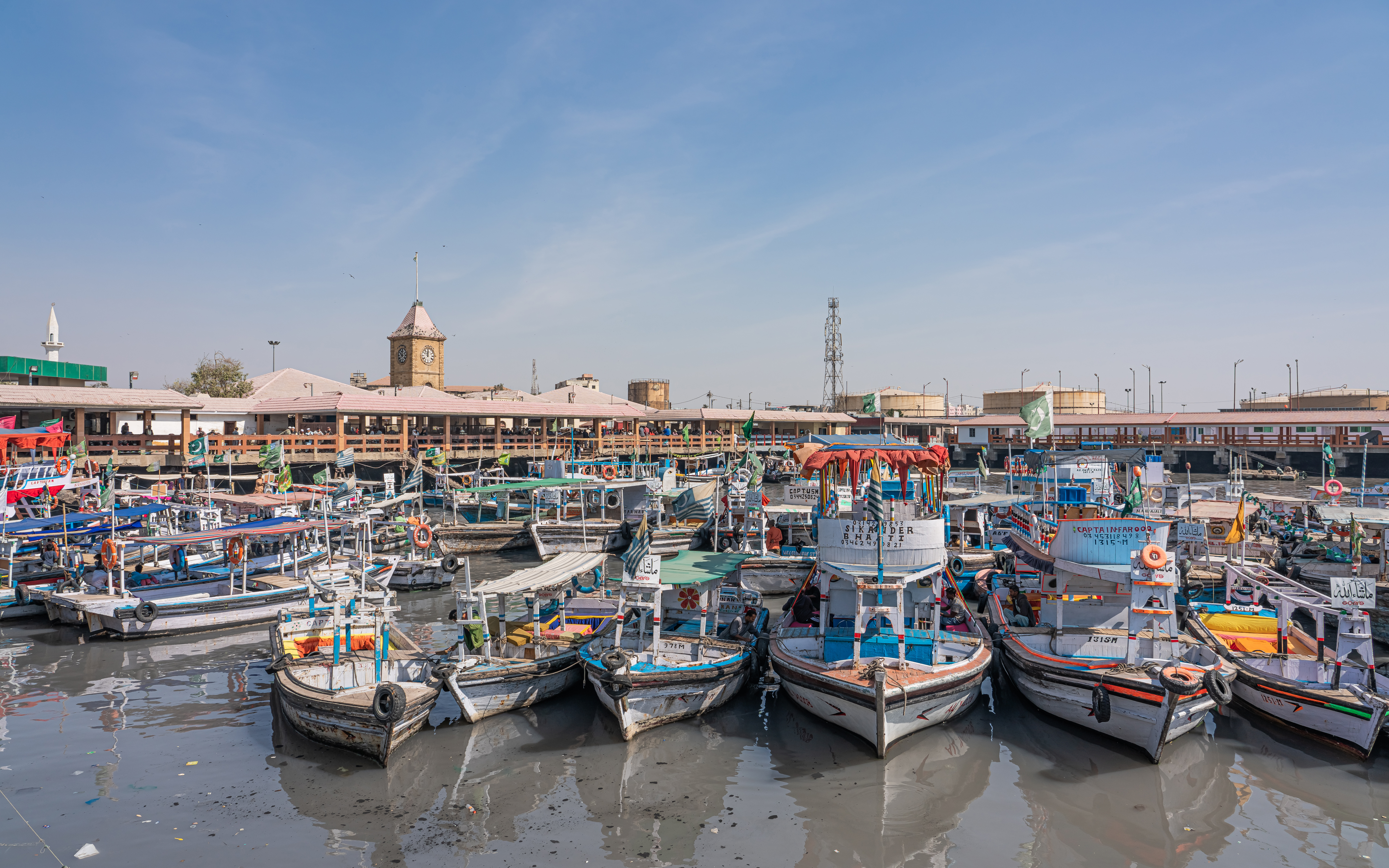
Kiamari's Sydenham Passenger Pavilion, located in the lower harbour
