= Kakapir =

Pakistani village

Coordinates: 24°50′42.59″N 66°54′0.16″E

Kakapir کاکاپیر
- Village
- Interactive map of Kakapir کاکاپیر
- District: Keamari District
- City: Karachi
- Country: Pakistan
- Time zone: UTC+5 (PST)
- Postal code: 75300

Kakapir (Sindhi: ڪڪو پير), (Urdu: کاکاپیر) is a fishing village and former island in Karachi Harbour, 15 km (9.3 mi) to the west of central Karachi, Pakistan. It is located near Hawke's Bay Beach, at the western end of Sandspit Beach, which now connects the island to the mainland. Mauripur lies to its north. The village is reportedly about 100 years old. Residents of the village were originally from the Mithadar and Kharadar neighborhoods of Karachi, who were settled by the British in Shams Pir during the construction of the Port of Karachi. Those residents migrated further west and established Kakapir.

Ethnically, the population is mostly Sindhi Lasi, who claim to be descendants of the original indigenous inhabitants of Karachi and the Sindh coast. The village had an estimated 600 residents in 2005. Prior to the construction of Manora Road in 1952, men from other villages could settle in Kakapir only if they married within the village. The village is in the midst of mangrove forests, which locals report are being cut down by criminal groups, who fill up the mangrove creeks and sell the land, causing serious harm to the ecology of the area.
