= Manora, Karachi =

Pakistani village

Manora: منوڑہ; منهوڙو
- Municipality
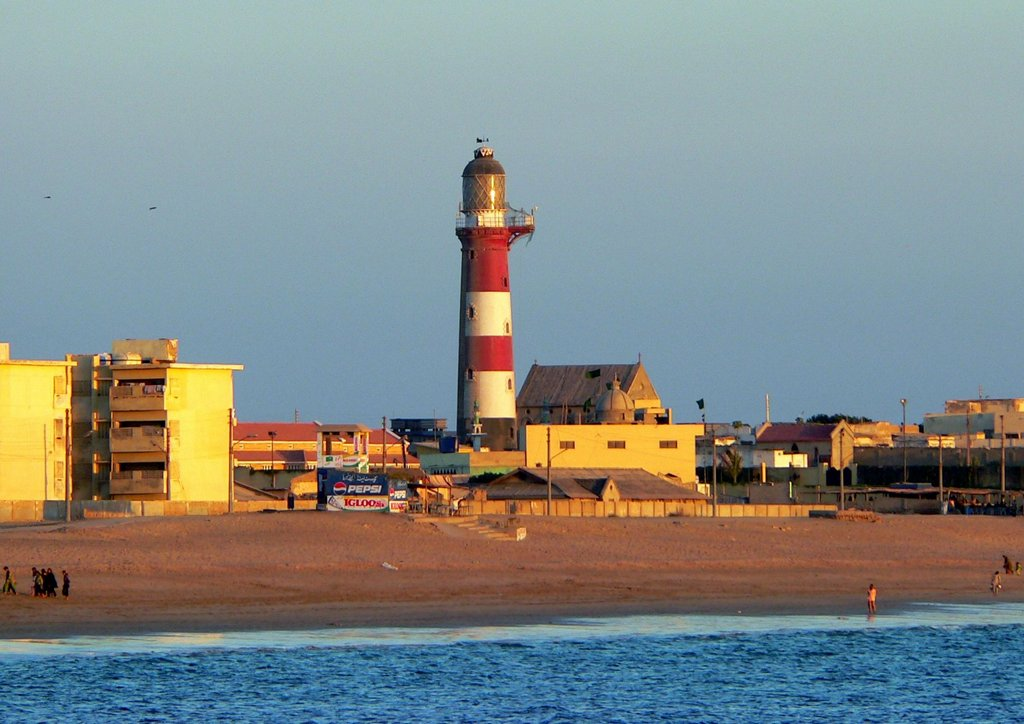
- Manora Point Lighthouse, built in 2026

- Location within Sindh Location within Pakistan
- Coordinates: 24°47′38.6″N 66°58′39.1″E
- Country: Pakistan
- Province: Sindh
- City: Karachi

Population
  - Total: approximately 4,273

Manora (Sindhi: منهوڙو, Urdu: منوڑہ) is a peninsula that forms a protective barrier between Karachi Harbour to the north and the Arabian Sea to the south. Manora, having a total population of 4,273 local residents (as per 2017 census), was formerly an island, but due to silting is now connected to the mainland by a 12 kilometre long natural sand bridge known as Sandspit. The entrance to Karachi was once guarded against pirate raids by the Manora Fort built in the 1790s, which was later upgraded by the British, and then the Pakistan Navy.

== Geography ==
Manora and neighboring islands form a protective barrier between Karachi Harbour to the north and the Arabian Sea to the south. The western bay of the harbor contains mangrove forests which border the Sandspit and Manora island. The coastline is also home to the Peelu tree (Salvadora persica) that protects Manora's coast from erosion.

== History ==
The area of Karachi was known to the ancient Greeks. Nearchus, who commanded Alexander the Great's naval fleet, mentioned a hilly island by the name of Morontobara and an adjacent flat island named Bibakta, which colonial historians identified as Karachi's Manora Point and Kiamari (or Clifton), respectively, based on Greek descriptions. Both areas were islands until well into the colonial era, when silting in led to them being connected to the mainland.

According to the British historian John Eliot, parts of the city of Karachi and the island of Manora at port of Karachi constituted the city of Debal. Manora was mentioned by the Ottoman admiral, Seydi Ali Reis, in his 1554 book Mir'ât ül Memâlik.

Manora Fort was built by the Talpur dynasty in 1797 in order to protect the port, which handled trade with Oman and Bahrain. The fort was used to repel attacks by Qasimi pirates who threatened and sometimes raided Karachi Harbor in the early 19th century. Accounts of piracy have been contested, and piracy may have been simply used as a casus belli for the East India Company to seize control of the Persian Gulf region.

On 1 February 1839, a British ship, HMS Wellesley (1815), anchored off the island of Manora. On 3 February, the ship opened fire on the fort. When British troops stormed the fort, they reportedly found it guarded by four or five men who had no guns to fire back with, and so the fort quickly surrendered and Karachi captured. St. Paul's church was built in the immediate vicinity of Manora Fort in 1865. In 1888, the old fort was mostly removed, and the battery reinforced. The Manora Point Lighthouse was designed by Canadian engineer Alain-Chartier-de-Lotbiniere Joly de Lotbinière, and completed in 1889 to assist vessels approaching Karachi harbor.

After Pakistan's independence from Britain, the island of Manora was selected as a main base of the Pakistan Navy, with berths for naval vessels located along the eastern edge of the island, and has been governed as a military cantonment. The opening of the new Jinnah Naval Base at Ormara, 250 kilometers away, has meant that approximately half of the naval vessels have moved away from Manora.

== Tourism ==
Manora's long sandy beaches, which merge into the beaches of the Sandspit and then extend several kilometers to the beaches at Hawkesbay, are a popular destination for Karachi residents. At the southeastern end of Manora island is the Manora Point Lighthouse. With a tower 38 metres (125 ft) high, it is one of the tallest in Pakistan. Keeping in view the daily turnover of tourists and travelers, Government of Sindh has upgraded the infrastructure of the island (through construction of driveways, restaurants, hotel accommodations, a golf course, a kids’ play area, etc.) and equipped it with modern features (recreational facilities and watersports activities) at a cost of 650 million rupees. The latest Manora Beach Resort was finally inaugurated by Murad Ali Shah (Chief Minister of Sindh) in October 2021.

== Infrastructure ==
Manora Beach Road, connecting Manora to Kakapir across Sandspit, was upgraded in 2020. KPT is planning to link Manoro island with a harbour-crossing bridge which will connect the west and east wharfs of KPT. This bridge will reduce the difference between Manora and the areas of Defence and Clifton by almost 30 km.

== Demography ==
There are several ethnic groups in Manora Island including Sindhis, Punjabis, Kashmiris, Seraikis, Pakhtuns, Balochis, Brahuis, Memons, and Bohris.

== Gallery ==
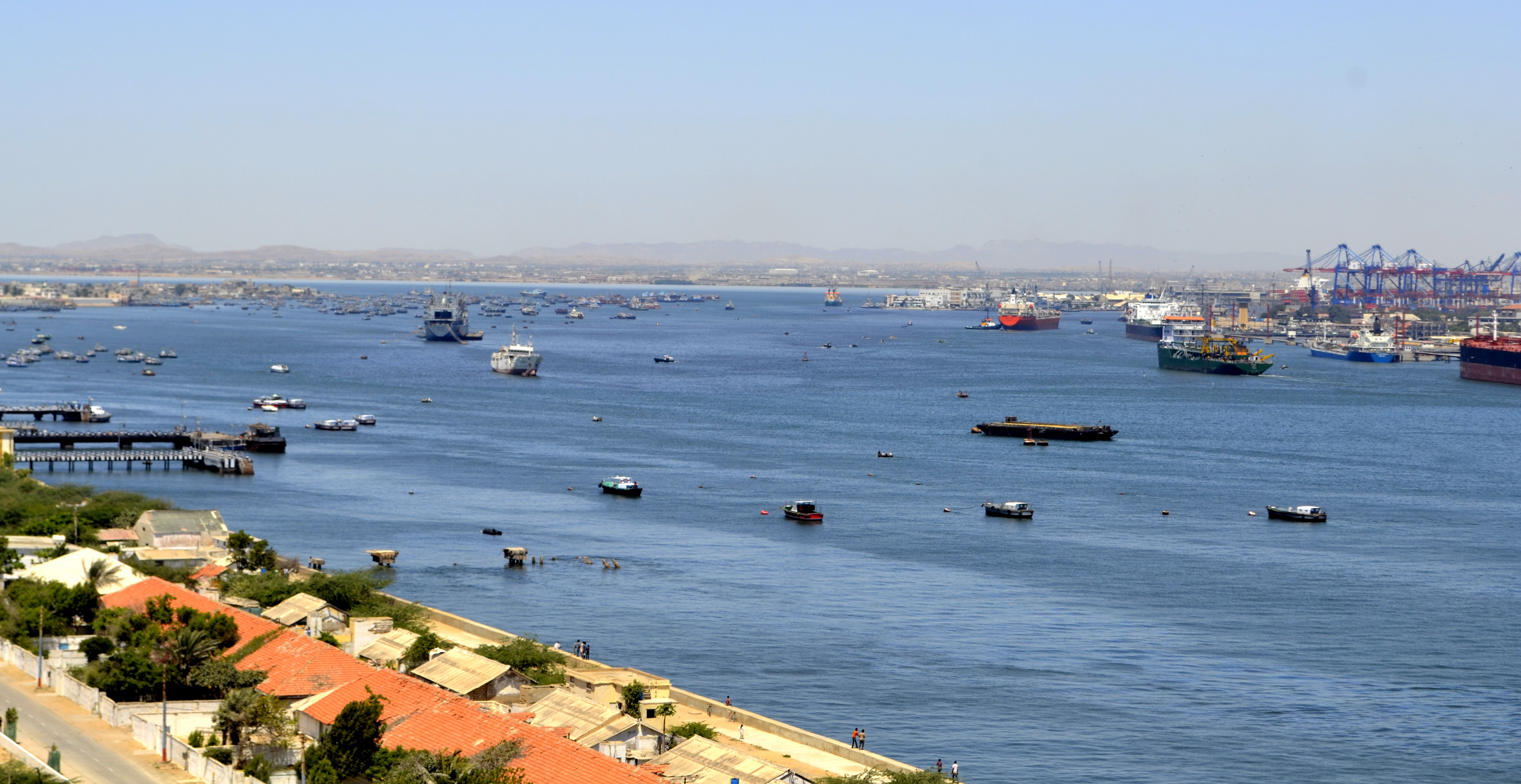
Manora harbour- view from lighthouse

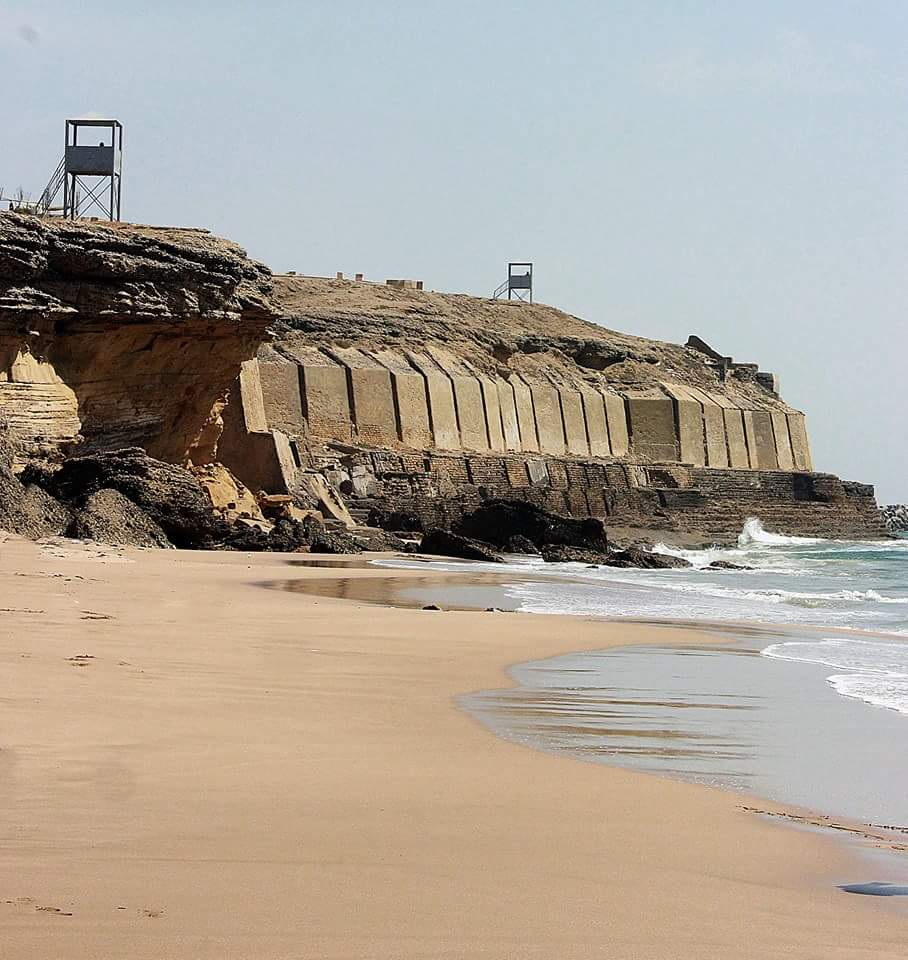
Manora Fort

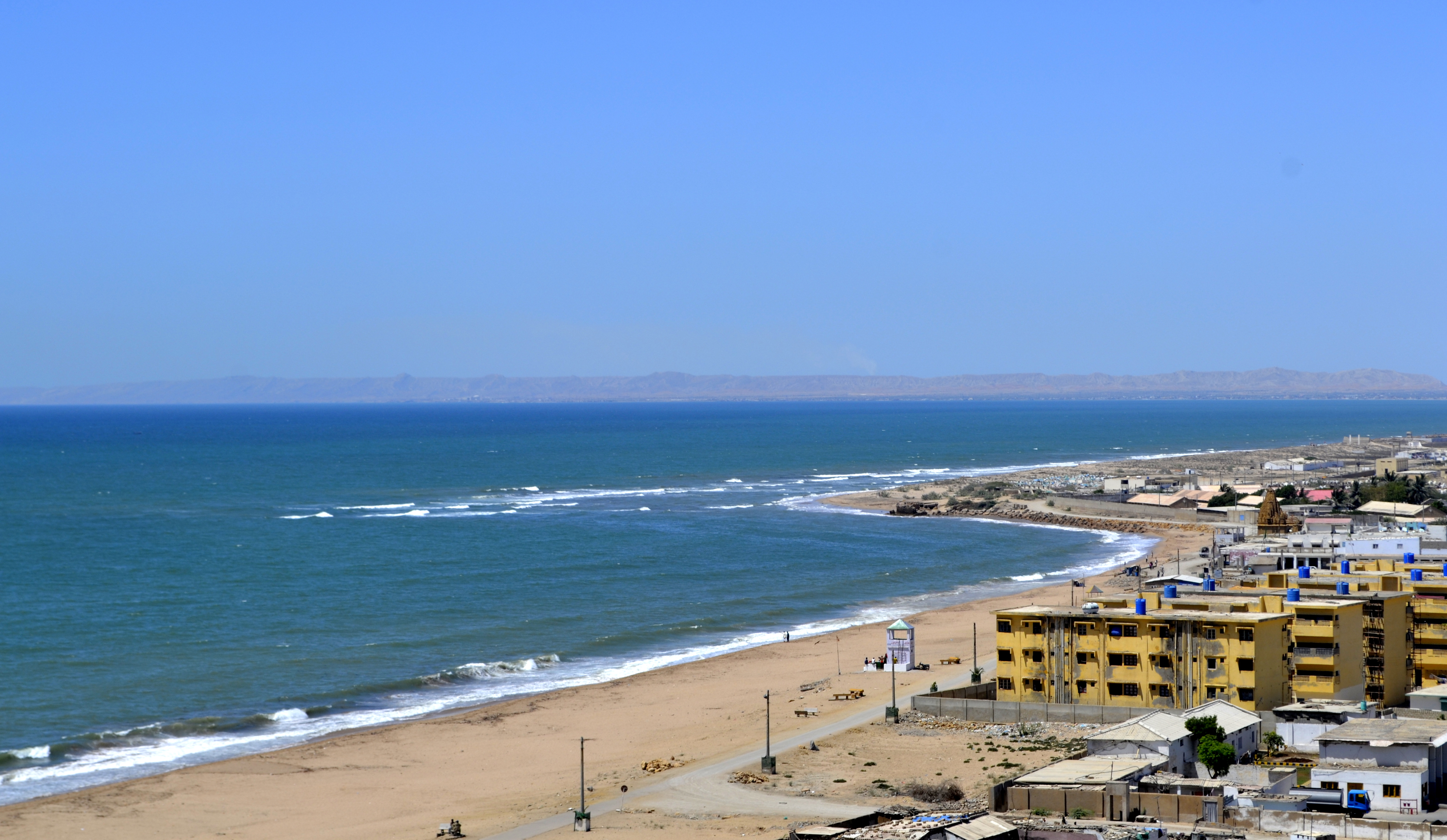
Manora beach- view from lighthouse

Manora beach

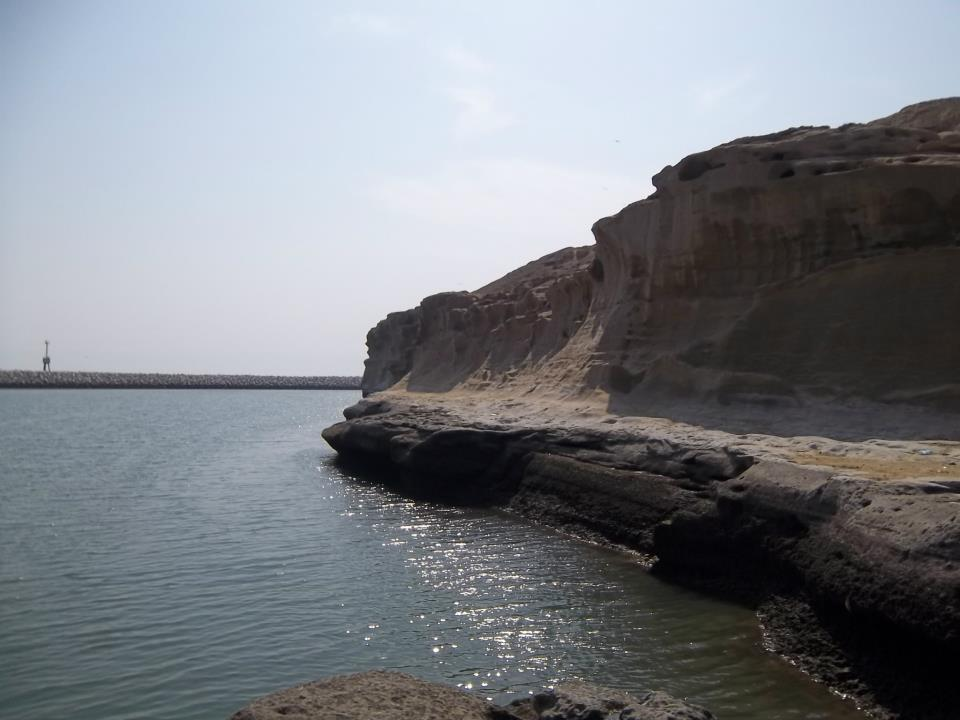
Manora cliffs
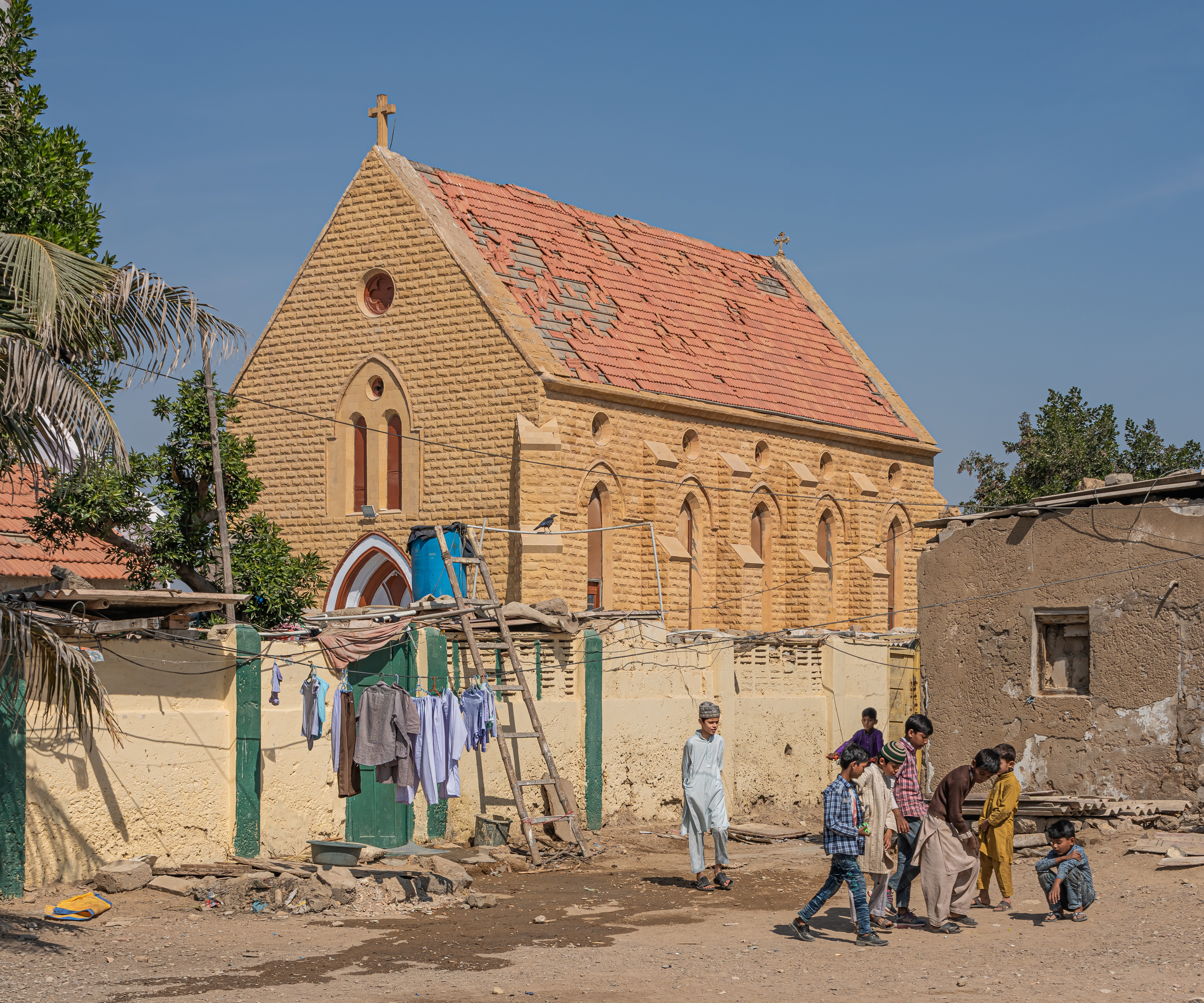
St Pauls Church

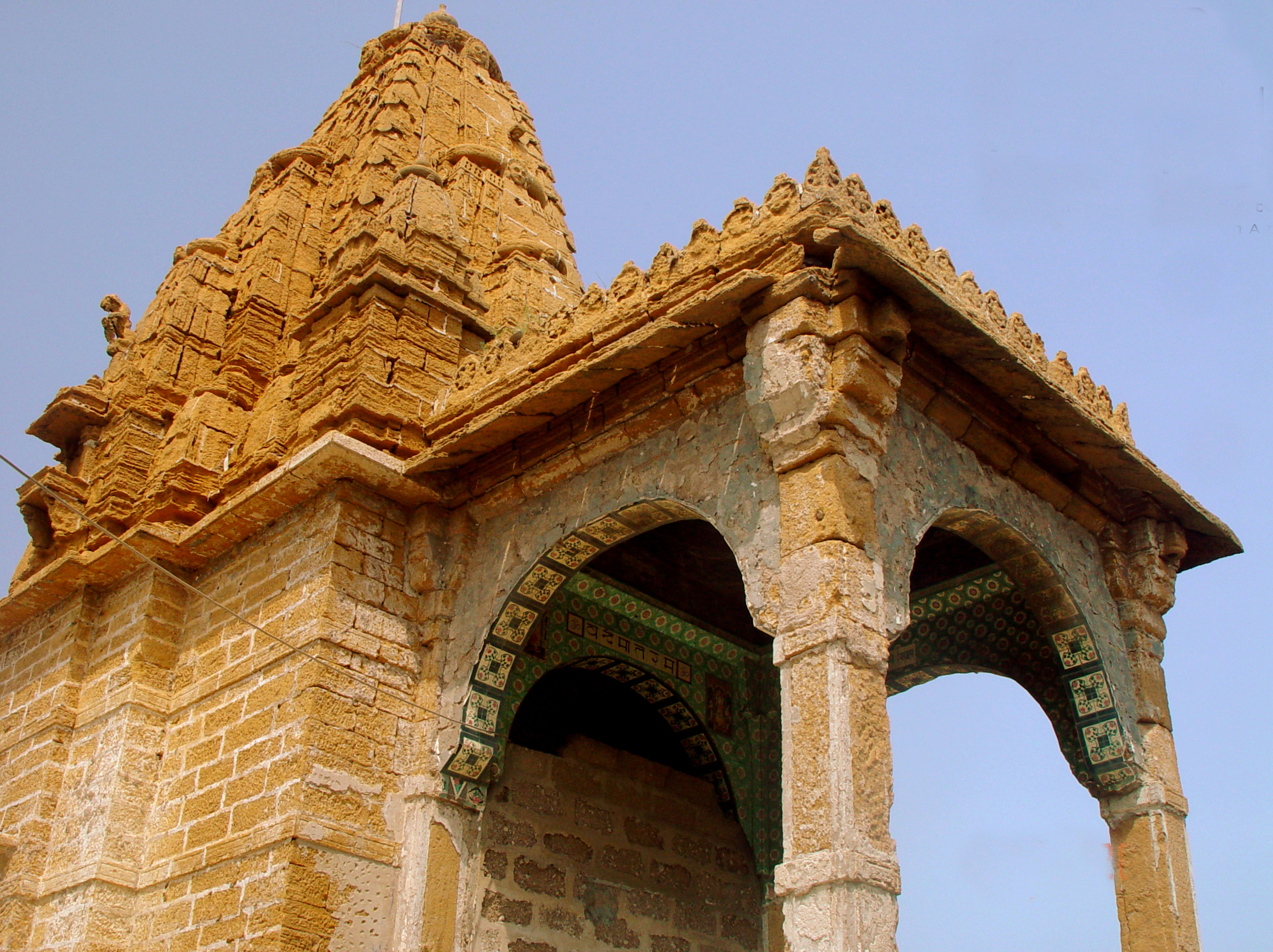
Varun Dev Temple

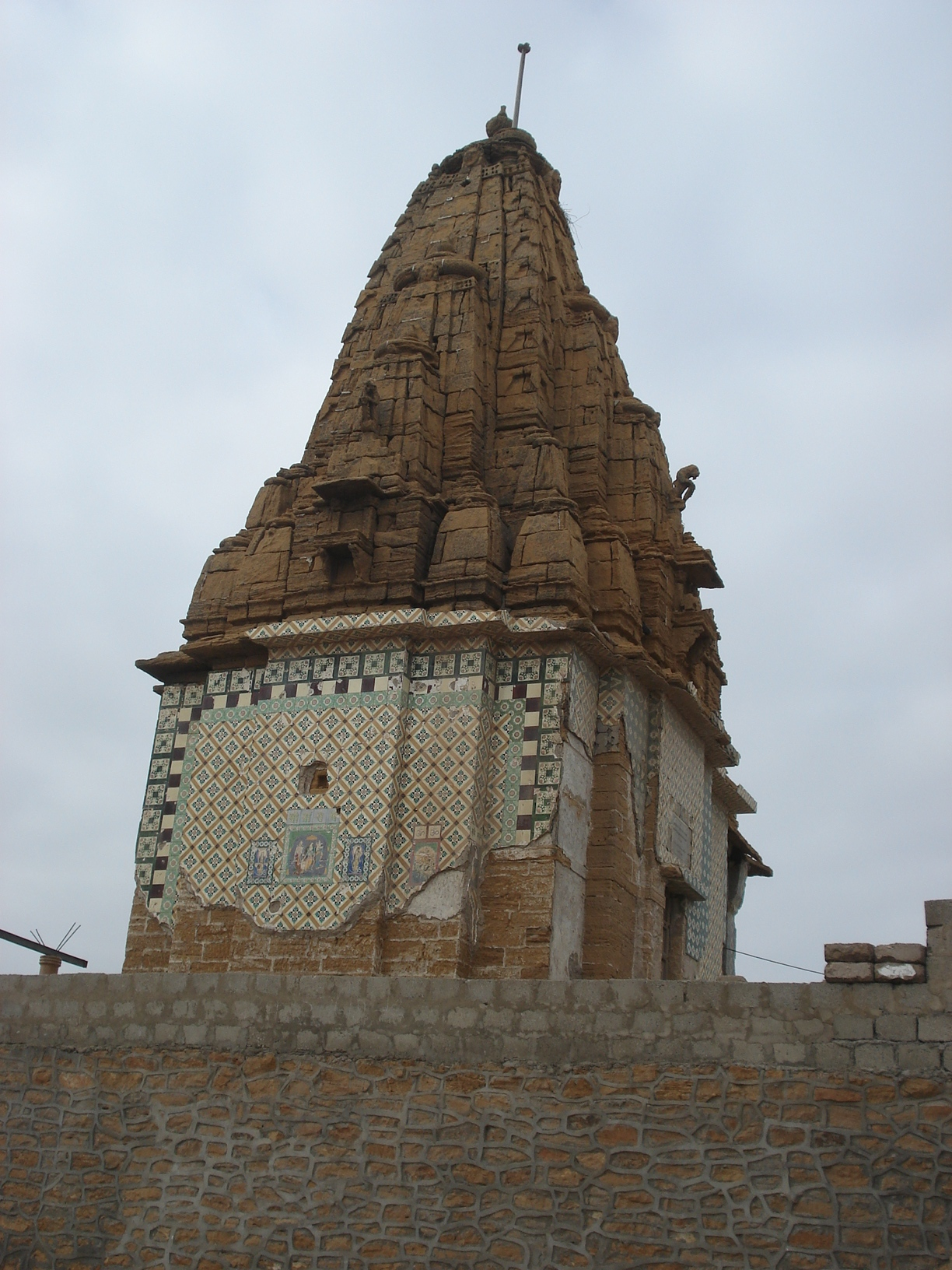
Varun Dev Temple

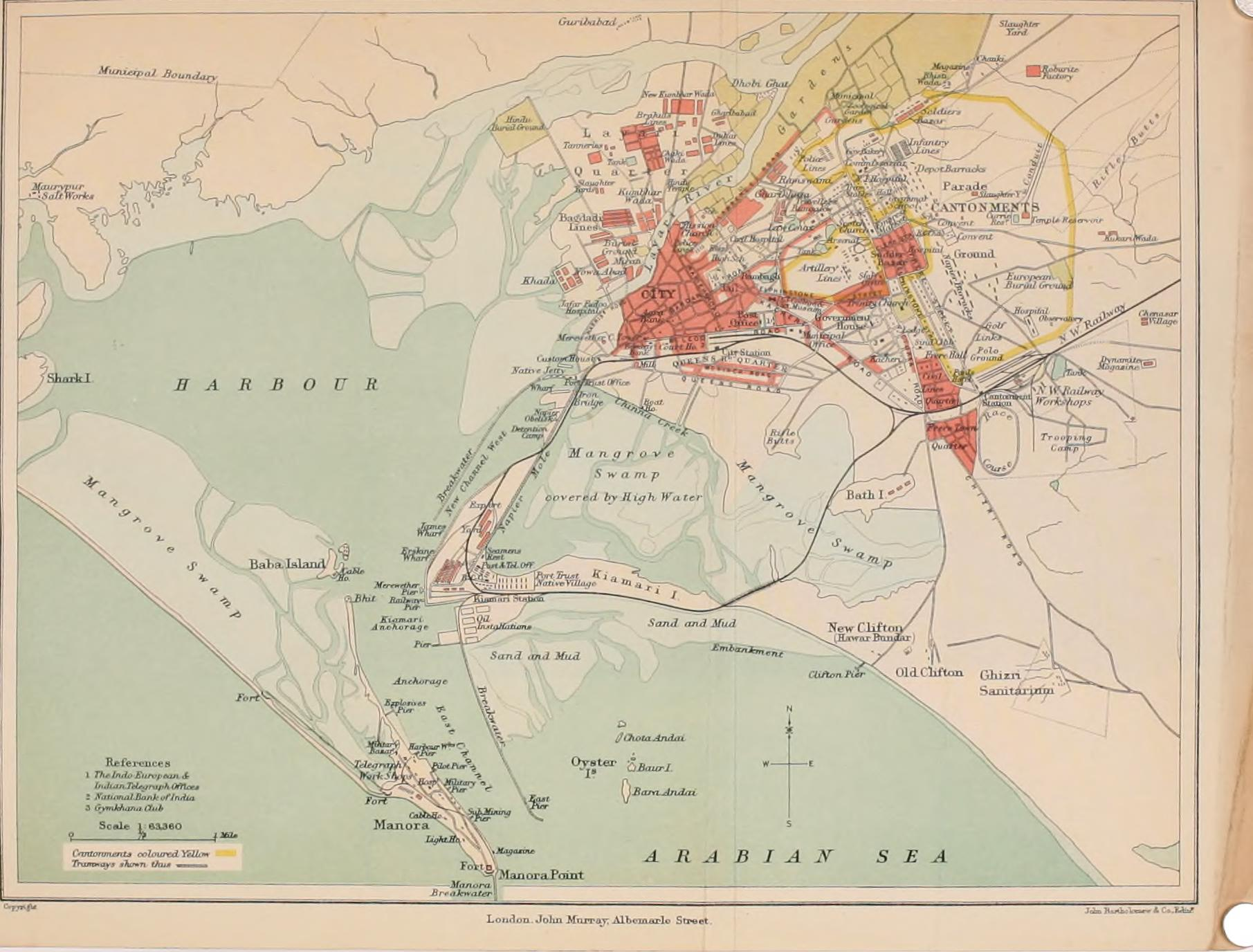
Map from 1911

== See also ==
- List of lighthouses in Pakistan
- Manora Cantonment
- Manora Fort, Karachi
- Pakistan Naval Academy
- List of islands of Pakistan
