= Kharadar General Hospital =

Hospital in Karachi, Pakistan

Geography
- Location: Nawab Mahabat Khanji Road, Dharamsala Kharadar, Karachi
- Coordinates: 24°51′13″N 66°59′43″E

Organisation
- Funding: Private Hospital

History
- Opened: 1918; 107 years ago

Links
- Website: kharadarhospital.org

Kharadar General Hospital, formerly known as Cement Hospital, (Urdu: کھارادر جنرل ہسپتال) is a non-profit 250-bed teaching and tertiary-care hospital situated on Nawab Mahabat Khanji Road in the historic port-side quarter of Kharadar, Karachi, Sindh, Pakistan. It serves the densely populated, low-income neighbourhoods of Kharadar, Mithadar and Lyari.

== History ==
Kharadar General Hospital was founded in 1918 by local philanthropists as a domiciliary midwifery service, when Karachi was struggling with plague and smallpox. In 1934, the Hindu philanthropist Seth Aesar Das and his son Aasan Mill donated a large endowment for a permanent maternity home; Mrs R. E. Gibson laid the foundation stone the same year. Lady Graham inaugurated the 50-bed “Cement Maternity Home” in 1936, a nickname inspired by its exposed-cement façade, and the facility continued to operate after the Partition under mayor Jamshed N. Mehta.

Through the second half of the twentieth century the hospital expanded its facilities: an evening dispensary opened in 1952, diagnostic services started in 1958, and a neonatal nursery in 1993. In 1995, it was formally renamed as Kharadar General Hospital.

In 2007, Professor Abdul Ghaffar Billoo Operation Complex, comprising six operating rooms was opened. It was named in recognition of Abdul Ghaffar Billoo.

In 2013, an obstetrics and gynecology block was inaugurated at Kharadar General Hospital.

In 2016, Dow University of Health Sciences granted Kharadar General Hospital School of Nursing permission to initiate a graduate program in addition to Post-RN and BSCN programs.
