= Bhit Shah =

Bhit Shah may refer to:

- Bhit (also called Bhit Shah), Sindh, Pakistan, the town where the shrine of Shah Abdul Latif Bhittai, patron saint of Sindh, is located.
- Bhit Shah Island, near Kiamari Town in Karachi, Sindh
