= Karachi Gateway Terminal Limited =

Pakistani cargo terminal company

Karachi Gateway Terminal Multipurpose (Private) Limited

- Type: Private
- Industry: Ports; Maritime; Logistics
- Founded: 2023-10-18
- Headquarters: Berth 11-17 East Wharf, Karachi Port, Karachi, Pakistan
- Key people: Khurram Aziz Khan, CEO
- Services: Bulk and General Cargo Terminal Operations
- Parent: AD Ports Group (UAE)
- Website: www.kgtl.com.pk

Karachi Gateway Terminal Multipurpose (Private) Limited (KGTML) operates a bulk and general cargo terminal on the East Wharf of Pakistan's Karachi Port. Karachi Port is Pakistan's most important port of international trade. Over 90% of imports and exports of Pakistan take place through Karachi Port.

== Background ==
Pakistan and United Arab Emirates signed an inter-governmental contract for economic cooperation in 2023. Under this contract the Karachi Port Trust has granted two concessions to a UAE public sector entity AD Ports Group to invest in, develop, and operate port terminals at the Karachi Port. AD Ports Group has established two separate joint venture companies with Kaheel Terminals of UAE to operate the two concessions namely Karachi Gateway Terminal (KGTL) and Karachi Gateway Terminal Multipurpose (KGTML).

== Karachi Gateway Terminal Multipurpose (Private) Limited ==
KGTML operates a bulk and general cargo terminal on berths 11–17 on the East Wharf of Karachi Port under a 25-year concession. The general cargo operations handles steel, paper, and clinker, while the clean bulk terminal handles grains and fertilizers. KGTML operates along 1,500 meters of quay wall for general cargo and bulk operations.

KGTML aims to enhance efficiency and capacity of the multipurpose terminal by 75%, enabling the terminal to handle up to 14 million tons per annum compared to its current 8 million tons per annum. KGTML is investing $75 million in the project within the first two years and a further investment of $100 million in five years timeframe.

== Karachi Gateway Terminal (Private) Limited ==
KGTL operates a container terminal on berths 6-10 on the East Wharf of Karachi Port under a 50-year concession. KGTL paid $50 million to Karachi Port Trust on April 22 2024 as upfront payment. Of this upfront payment $25 million are for concession fee and the remaining $25 million are advance payment for use of the port for KGTL's container terminal operations.

Mr. Khurram Aziz Khan is the current CEO of both KGTL and KGTML.

== Milestones for Karachi Port ==
Karachi Port is the most important deep sea water port of Pakistan.

KGTML set a new record with the offloading of 20,300 metric tons of rock phosphate within 24 hours on June 14 2024 at the Karachi Port.
