= Seth Naomal Hotchand =

Sindhi merchant (1804-1878)

Seth Naomal Hotchand CIE CSI
- Born: Seth Naomal Hotchand Bhojwani; 1804; Kharadar, Karachi
- Died: September 16, 1878 (aged 73–74); Karachi, British India
- Occupations: Merchant, Military contractor
- Years active: 1832–1878
- Father: Seth Hotchand

Seth Naomal Hotchand Bhojwani CIE CSI (1804 – 16 September 1878) was a Sindhi merchant and military contractor, known for helping the East India Company conquer Sindh around 1832 in an attempt to achieve notable position in the society through money and chivalry.

== Biography ==
He was born in Kharadar, Karachi in 1804. Naomal was the great grandson of a Hindu trader Bhojomal, known for founding Karachi in 1729. Naomal's father Hotchand was also a merchant who ran business extending all the Indian subcontinent and the Middle East such as Afghanistan, Iran and Muscat. Seth's family was one of the richest families at times who used to lend money the Mirs of Sindh.

Around 1832, a communal violence broke out between Hindu and Muslim communities in Karachi, following which one of Naomal's teacher beat him up. He subsequently established his association with British Company and worked as a British India Army contractor against the Mirs of Karachi's rule in the region.

Muhammad Usman Damohi, a historian published a book in 2013 titled Karachi: Taareekh Kay Aaenay Main arguing that his alleged lust for money and status placed Sindhi people under British rule.

He died on September 16, 1878, in Karachi.

== Titles and memoirs ==
His role in conquering Sindh was appreciated by the British Company for which Queen Victoria awarded him Companion of the Most Exalted Order of Staff of Indian Empire (CIE) and Order of the Star of India (CSI).

In 1996, Literary Board of Sindh printed an edition titled Memoirs of Seth Naomul Hotchand of Karachi which was translated into English in 1915. It was originally published in 1982 by Oxford University Press.

== Books ==
- HOTCHAND, NAOMAL (1995). A Forgotten Chapter of Indian History, as Described in the Memoirs of Seth Naomul Hotchand. W. Pollard & Company.
