= Port of Karachi =

Deep-water seaport in Sindh, Pakistan

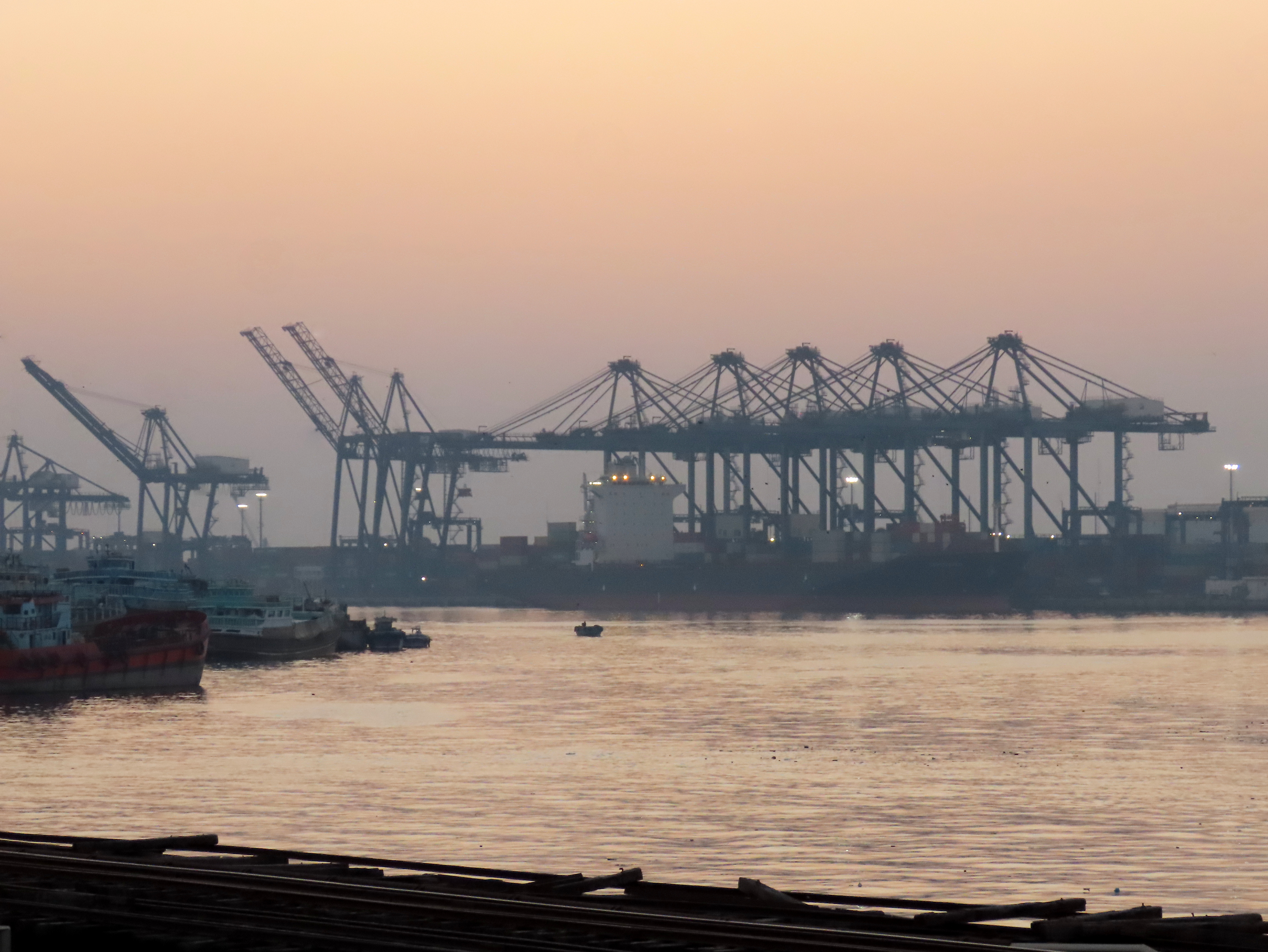
- Interactive map of Port of Karachi
- Location within Pakistan

Location
- Country: Pakistan
- Location: Karachi, Pakistan, north shore of Arabian Sea
- Coordinates: 24.835°N 66.982°E
- UN/LOCODE: PKKHI

Details
- Opened: 1857
- Operated by: Karachi Port Trust
- Owned by: Ministry of Ports and Shipping, Government of Pakistan
- Type of Harbor: Natural
- Size of harbour: 32 km (20 mi)
- No. of berths: 41
- No. of wharfs: 8
- Draft depth: 16.0 m.

Statistics
- Annual cargo tonnage: 65.25 million Metric tons
- Annual container volume: 1.563 million TEUs
- Website www.kpt.gov.pk

The Port of Karachi (Urdu: کراچی بندرگاہ, Bandar gāh Karāchī) is one of South Asia's largest and busiest deep-water seaports, located in Karachi, Pakistan. Handling about 60% of the nation's cargo (25 million tons per annum), the port is located on the Karachi Harbour, between Kiamari, Manora, and Kakapir, and close to Karachi's main business district and several industrial areas. The geographic position of the port places it in close proximity to major shipping routes such as the Strait of Hormuz. It is also ideally located to offer gateway services to the maritime trade for the Central Asian Republics (CARs). The administration of the port is carried out by the Karachi Port Trust, which was established in 1857.

== History ==
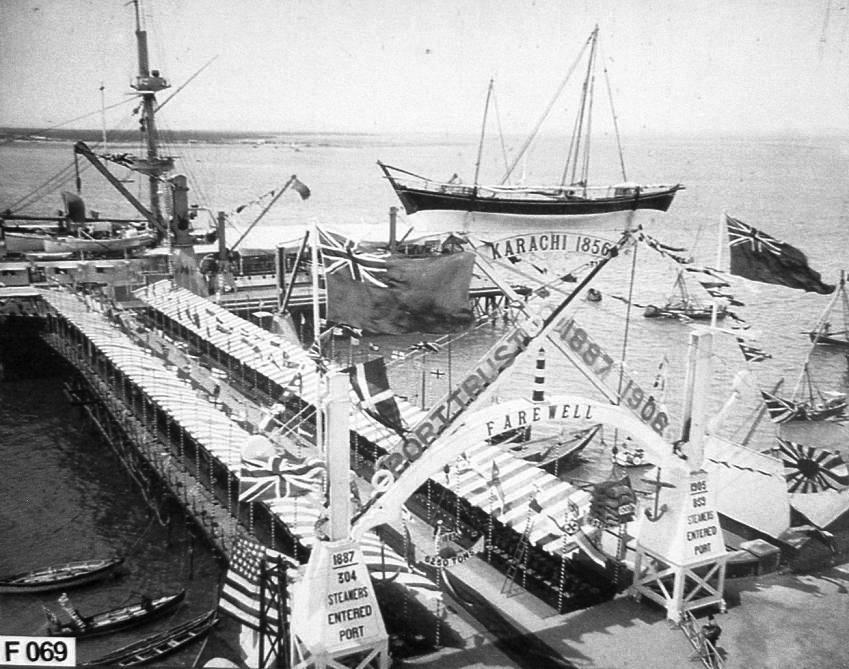
Karachi Port in 1906 - Farewell arch erected by the Karachi Port for the Royal visit of King George V

The history of the port is intertwined with that of the city of Karachi. Several ancient ports have been attributed in the area including "Krokola", "Morontobara" (Woman's Harbour) (mentioned by Nearchus), Barbarikon (the Periplus of the Erythraean Sea, and Debal (a city captured by the Arab general Muhammad bin Qasim in 712 CE). There is a reference to the early existence of the port of Karachi in the "Umdah", by the Arab navigator Sulaiman al Mahri (AD 1511), who mentions "Ras al Karazi" and "Ras Karashi" while describing a route along the coast from Pasni to Ras Karashi. Karachi is also mentioned in the sixteenth century Turkish treatise Mir'ât ül Memâlik by the Ottoman captain Seydi Ali Reis, who warns sailors about whirlpools and advises them to seek safety in "Kaurashi" harbour if they found themselves drifting dangerously.

In 1728 heavy rains silted up the harbour at Kharak, forcing merchants to relocate to the area of modern Karachi. In 1729, they built a new fortified town called Kolachi (also known as Kalachi-jo-Kun and Kolachi-jo-Goth) on high ground north of Karachi bay, surrounded by a 16-foot (5 m) high mud and timber-reinforced wall with gun-mounted turrets and two gates. The gate facing the sea was called "Kharadar" (salt gate), and the gate facing the Lyari River was called "Mithadar" (sweet gate). From 1729 to 1783 the strategic location of Kolachi saw the town change hands several times between the Khans of Kalat and the rulers of Sind. In 1783, after two prolonged sieges the town fell to the Talpur Mirs of Sind, who constructed Manora Fort mounted with cannons on Manora island at the harbour entrance.

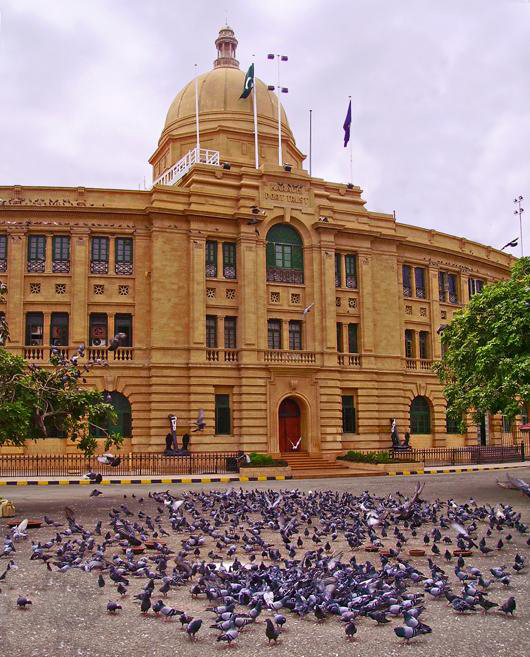
Karachi Port Trust Building

The British were concerned about Russian expansion towards the Arabian Sea, so in 1839 they occupied Karachi and later the whole of the Sindh. The port served as a landing point for troops during the First Afghan War. A number of British companies opened offices and warehouses in Karachi and the population increased rapidly. By 1852, Karachi was an established city with a population of 14,000 and a prosperous overseas trade.

The modern port began to take shape in 1854, when the main navigation channel was dredged and a mole or causeway was constructed to link the main harbour with the rest of the city. This was followed by construction of Manora breakwater, Keamari Groyne, the Napier Mole Bridge and the Native Jetty Bridge. The construction of the wharves started in 1882, and by 1914 the East Wharf and the Napier Mole Boat Wharf were complete while 1927 and 1944, the West Wharf, the lighterage berths and the ship-repair berths were constructed between 1927 and 1944.

By 1899 Karachi was the largest wheat and cotton exporting port in South Asia. The period between 1856 and 1872 saw a marked increase in trade, especially during the American Civil War when cotton from Sindh replaced American cotton as a raw material in the British textile industry and the opening of the Suez Canal in 1869. Karachi was an important military base during the First World War (1914–18) because it was the first British Raj port of call for ships coming through the Suez Canal and was the gateway to Afghanistan and the Russian Empire. Karachi was again a military base and port for supplies to the Russian front during the Second World War (1939–1945). In 1947, the British left the region and India and Pakistan were formed. In 1974, a bunch of terrorists seized a Greek ship and held the Greek crew for a number of hours. They wanted the Greek government to meet their demands. After this, the hostages were released and the terrorists fled the country.

In November 2025, Pakistan's first-ever standardised bunkering operations began at Karachi Port.

== Port Terminal Operators ==
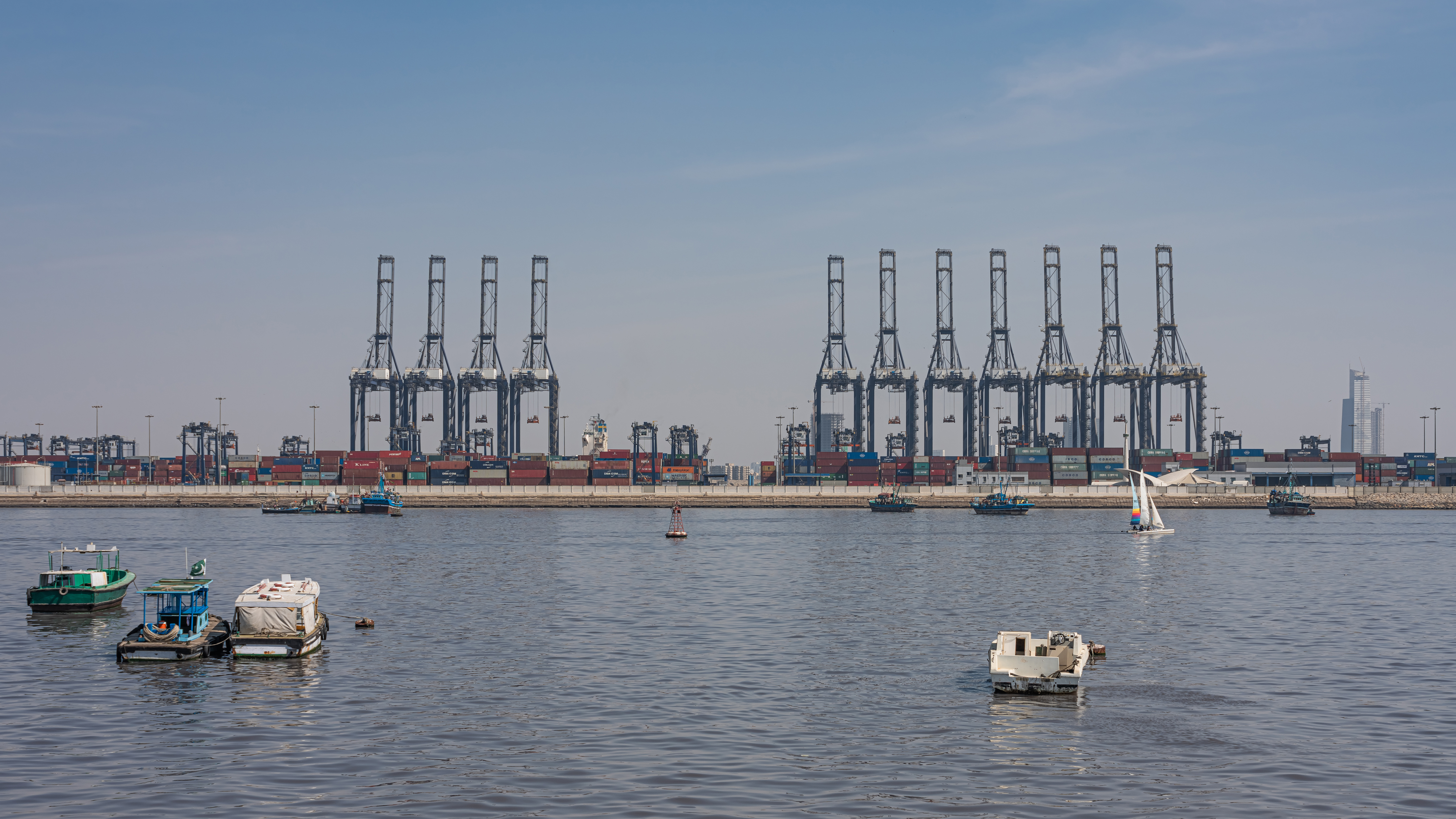
Port facilities

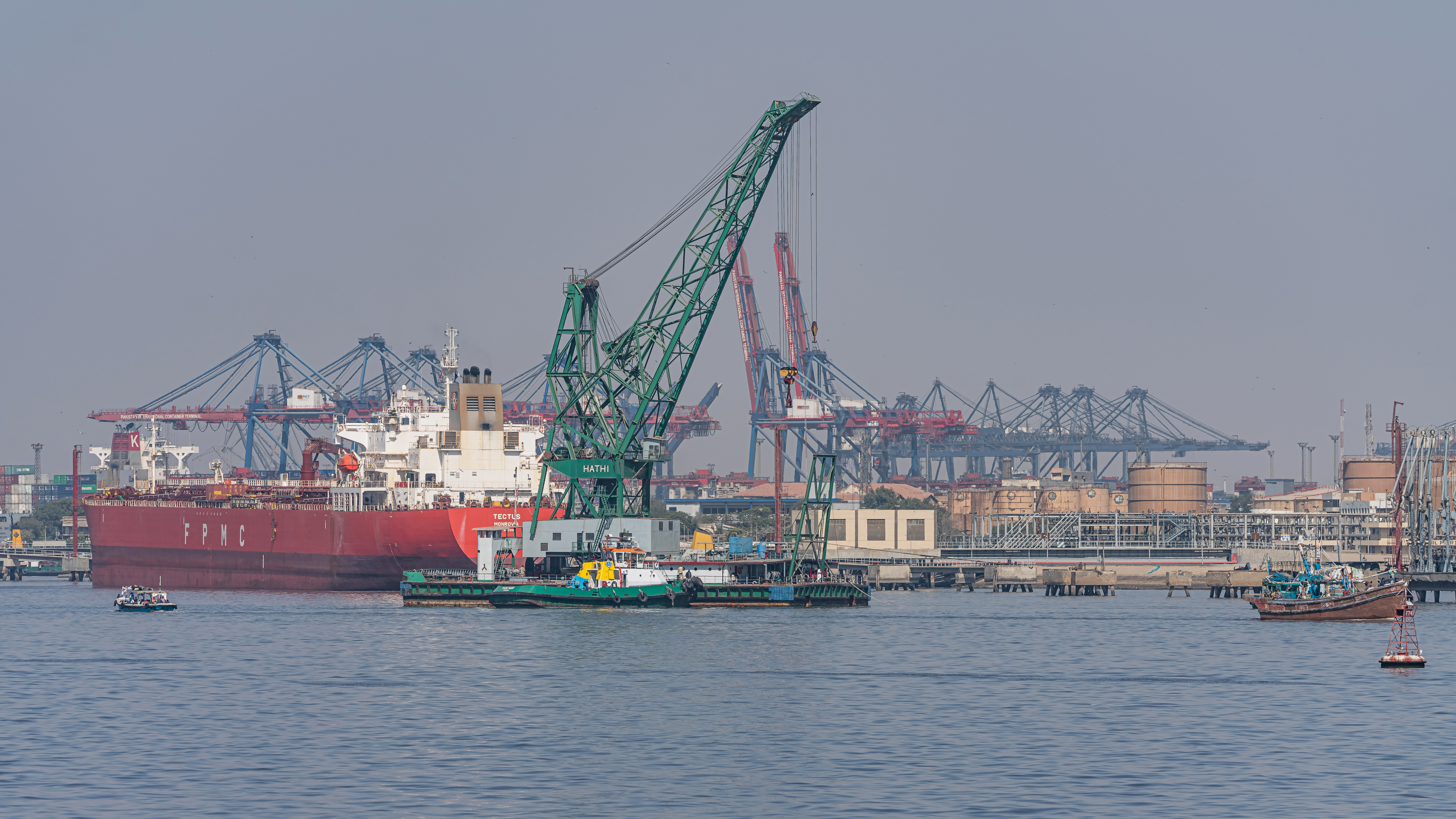
Seaport from another angle.

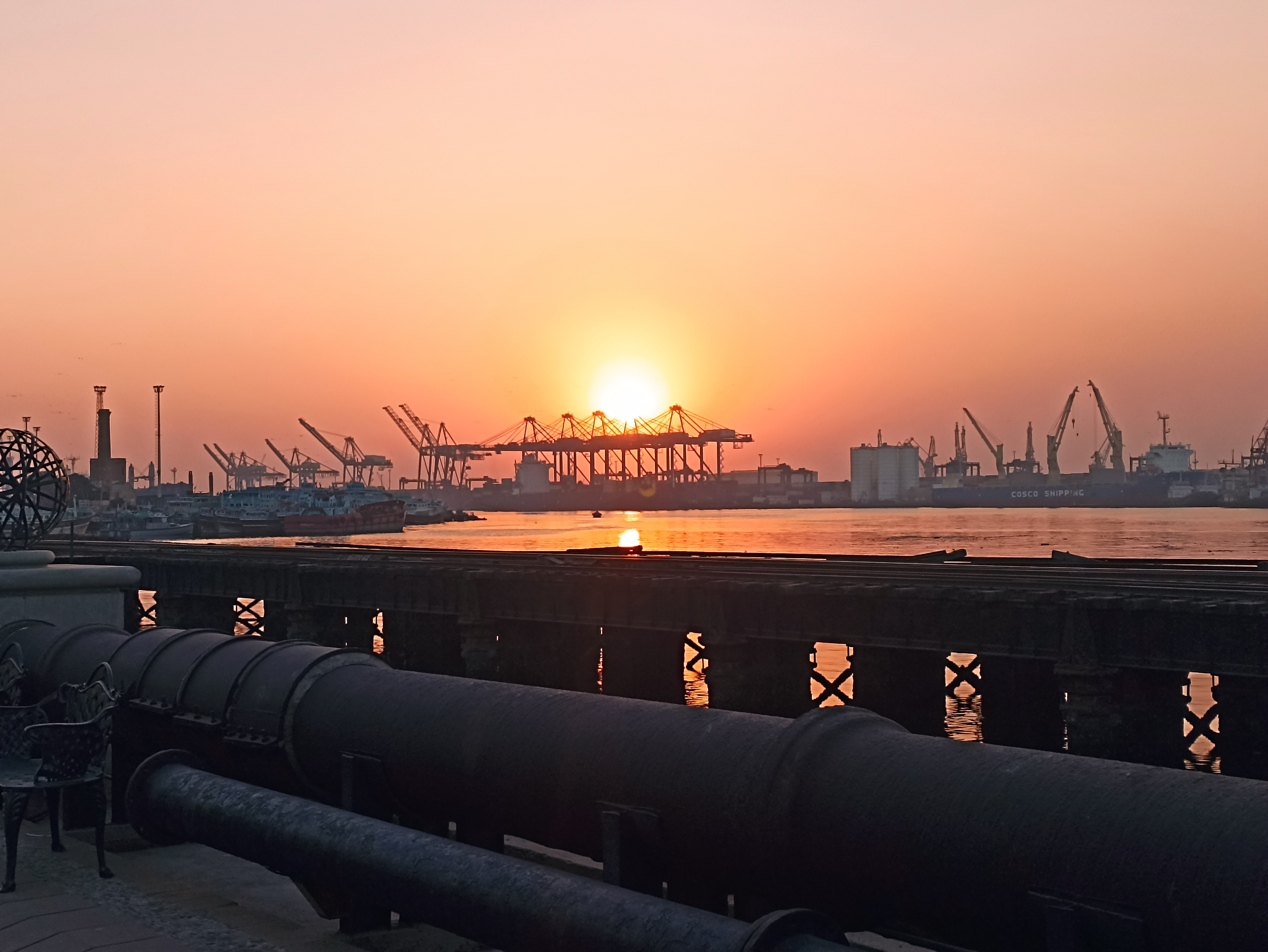
Karachi Seaport as seen from Port Grand

Karachi Port comprises a deep natural harbour with an 11 kilometre long approach channel that provides safe navigation for vessels up to 75,000 tonnes deadweight (DWT). Karachi Port has three wharves; East Wharf with seventeen vessel berths, West Wharf with thirteen vessel berths, and South Wharf with four vessel berths. The maximum depth alongside the berths is currently 11.3 metres. Of these two of the wharves extend in opposite directions along the upper harbour – the East Wharf northeast from Keamari Island and the West Wharf southwest from Saddar town. The two wharves each include a container terminal. The containerized cargo operations started in 1973 at the Karachi Port.

- Karachi Gateway Terminal (Private) Limited (KGTL) started container terminal operations in July 2023. KGTL operates across a quay length of 800 metres at berths 6–10 on the East Wharf of Karachi Port.
- Karachi Gateway Terminal Multipurpose (Private) Limited (KGTML) started bulk and general cargo terminal operations in February 2024. It operates across a quay length of 1500 metres at berths 11–17 on the East Wharf of Karachi Port.
- Karachi International Container Terminal (KICT) started operating a container terminal in 1998 at Karachi Port. KICT operates across a quay length of 600 metres at berths 28–30 on the West Wharf of Karachi Port. KICT has a handling capacity of 300,000 TEUs per annum and can berth container vessels with up to 11 metres draught. The total quay length of 600 metres is divided split into three container berths. KICT is equipped with three Panamax cranes and one post-Panamax crane.
- Pakistan International Bulk Terminal (PIBT) started bulk terminal operations in 2002 at Port Qasim. PIBT operates across a quay length of 600 metres split into two berths. It has a container handling capacity of 350,000 TEUs per annum and handles container ships up to 11.5-metre draught. The terminal is equipped with two Panamax cranes.
- Al-Hamd International Container Terminal (AICT) started container terminal operations in 2001 at a site west of the Layari river. AICT is situated next to the Sindh Industrial Trading Estate, the new truck stand at Hawkes Bay Road and close to the RCD Highway, Super Highway and the future Layari Bypass.

Karachi Port has three liquid cargo-handling berths (oil piers) to handle both POL and non POL products. There port also has a dry dock at Manora for quick boat repairs. Repairs for larger ships are offered at the Karachi Shipyard and Engineering Works (KSEW). The shipyard carries out shipbuilding and repair for both commercial and military customers on a 29-hectare (70 acres) site at the West Wharf. The facilities include a large shipbuilding hall, three shipbuilding berths, two dry-docks and three foundries.

== Expansion ==
The flow of cargo to and from the port is hampered by severe congestion in the harbour with several other maritime facilities located close to the port. Adjacent to the West Wharf is the Karachi Fishing Harbour, which is administered separately from the port and is the base for a fleet of several thousand fishing vessels. The West Wharf also hosts a ship repair facility and shipyard and a naval dockyard at the tip of the wharf, while to the south of the port are the Karachi Naval Base and the Kiamari Boat Club.

The Port of Karachi also faces competition from a new private terminal located 5 kilometres to the west. In recent years the federal government has attempted to alleviate the increased congestion by constructing a second port in Karachi thirty kilometres to the east at Port Qasim and a third major port at Gwadar, about 650 kilometres west of Karachi.

The Karachi Fishing Harbour has been upgraded recently, and a second fishing harbour built 18 kilometres away at Korangi. The transfer of some naval vessels to the new naval base at Ormara has reduced congestion further.

Further deepening of the port has been planned by the Karachi Port Trust in order to enhance facilities. The channel is being dredged initially to 13.5 metres deep to cater for 12-metre draught vessels at all tides. Kiamari Groyne, located at the outer tip of the harbour, will be dredged to 16.5 metres to enable vessels up to 300 metres long to dock. Other projects to expand the port include:

- An increase the handling capacity of KICT from 300,000 TEUs to 400,000 TEUs per annum
- Two new berths at KICT with 14 metres depth alongside and an additional 100,000 m^{2} terminal/stacking area
- Installation of modern facilities at PICT (completed in April 2004)
- A new bulk cargo terminal at East Wharf
- Reconstruction of the oldest oil pier to allow tankers of 90,000 tonnes deadweight (DWT) to berth
- A new 0.4-square-kilometre (100-acre) cargo village to cater for containers and general and bulk cargo
- Reconstruction of the 100-year-old NMB Wharf to enhance the berthing of passenger vessels
- The purchase of a new dredger, two hopper barges, two harbour tugs, two water barges, an anchor hoist vessel, two pilot boats, and a dredger tender
- A new desalination plant to address the city's water shortage problem
- A 150-metre (500 ft) high Port Tower for commercial and recreational use including a revolving restaurant
- The construction of a 2 km^{2} (500-acre) Port Town with 13,000 homes for port workers at nearby Hawkes Bay
- A new Port Club at Chinna Creek adjacent to the East Wharf

On 9 November 2007, the Karachi Port Trust signed a US$1 billion agreement with Hutchison Port Holdings to construct a new terminal called the "Pakistan Deep Water Container Port", which would begin operations by 2010, and would have ten berths capable of handling Super Post Panamax container ships.

== Karachi Gateway Terminal (Private) Limited ==
Karachi Gateway Terminal (Private) Limited - KGTL, operates under a 50-year concession to operate a container terminal at berths 6–10 on the East Wharf of Karachi Port. KGTL is a joint venture firm of AD Ports Group as a major investor and Kaheel Terminals.

AD Ports Group will invest $220 million in the upgradation and expansion of the container terminal. Karachi Gateway Terminal plans on achieving a total handling capacity of 1 million TEUs (Twenty-Foot Equivalent) with investments in machinery and infrastructure.

The current draft depth of berths is 13 metres that KGTL plans to increase to up to 15 metres to cater to larger and deeper vessels. There are also plans to develop a turning basin in collaboration with Karachi Port Trust that would allow vessels of LOA (Length Over All) of about 350 metres.

== Karachi Gateway Terminal Multipurpose (Private) Limited ==
Karachi Gateway Terminal Multipurpose (Private) Limited - KGTML, operates under a 25-year concession to operate a bulk and general cargo terminal at berths 11–17 on the East Wharf o Karachi Port. KGTML is a joint venture of AD Ports Group as a major shareholder and Kaheel Terminals, UAE.

KGTML is scheduled to receive an investment of $100 million from AD Ports Group of which $75 million is expected to be made within the first two years of the concession. The investment will raise operational efficiency to 75% enabling the terminal to handle up to 14 million tons per annum compared to the current cargo handling of 8 million tons. This transactional volume is expected to be achieved within the first five years.

== South Asia Pakistan Terminal ==
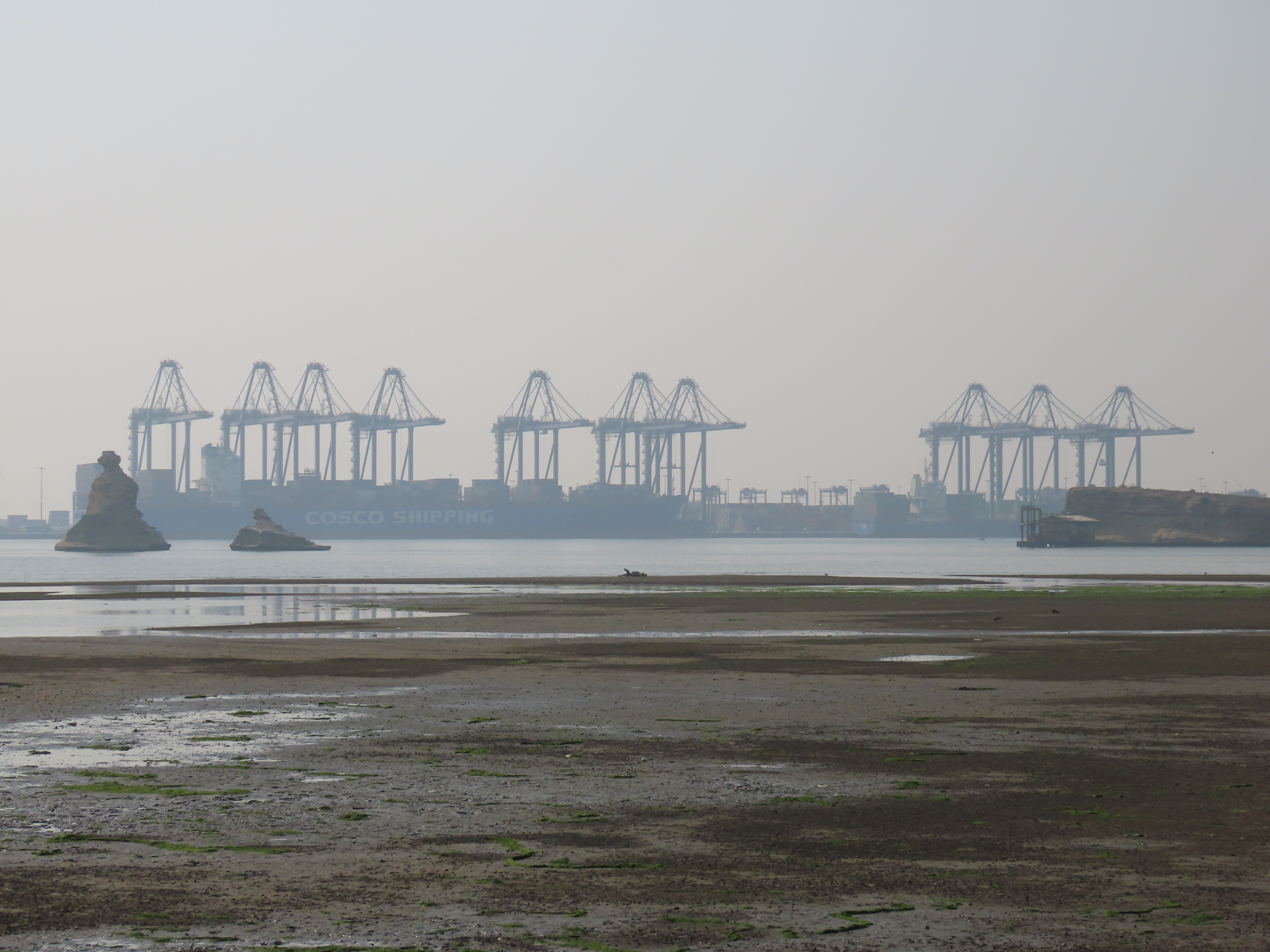
Hutchison Port

Since 2016, South Asia Pakistan Terminal (SAPT) operates the largest deep sea port of the country. Hutchison Ports Pakistan invested $600m in the first phase of SAPT which included two berths having length of 800 metres.

Hutchison Ports Pakistan is a subsidiary of Hutchison Port Holdings, which in turn is a subsidiary of CK Hutchison Holdings. On 18 December 2019, Hutchison Ports Pakistan welcomed CV COSCO BELGIUM, the largest container vessel to ever call at any port of Pakistan, with a length of over 366 metres and a capacity of 13,386 TEUs.

== Environmental concerns ==
In March 2024, The World Economic Forum (WEF) reported that Pakistan has almost tripled its mangrove forests over the last 30 years.

The area around the harbour includes several mangrove forests which are constantly under threat from human activities. To the east of the port lies Chinna Creek, which covers about 6 km^{2} and is dotted with mangrove islands. To the southwest of the port is another much larger mangrove forest in the bay formed by several islands and Manora breakwater; the river Layari flows into this bay, bringing waste from upstream suburbs.

The beach immediately east of the harbour was the scene of a significant oil spillage when the Greek-registered Tasman Spirit ran aground on 28 July 2003. The environmental impact included large numbers of dead fish and turtles and damage to a key mangrove forest, as well as dozens of people suffering nausea.

== Labour relations ==
The Karachi Dock Labour Board (KDLB) is responsible for labour relations between employees and the Karachi Port Trust. In October 2006, the Pakistan government decided to close down Karachi Dock Labour Board by the end of the year as part of its port strategy and under the National Trade Corridor (NTC) programme. The closure of KDLB would cost around Rs 4.2 billion ($70 million) to the national exchequer.

== See also ==
- List of ports in Pakistan
- Pakistan Marine Academy
- Pakistan Merchant Navy
- Gwadar port
- Transport in Karachi
- Transport in Pakistan
- Ministry of Maritime Affairs (Pakistan)
