= Alain Chartier Joly de Lotbiniere =

Officer in Royal Engineers

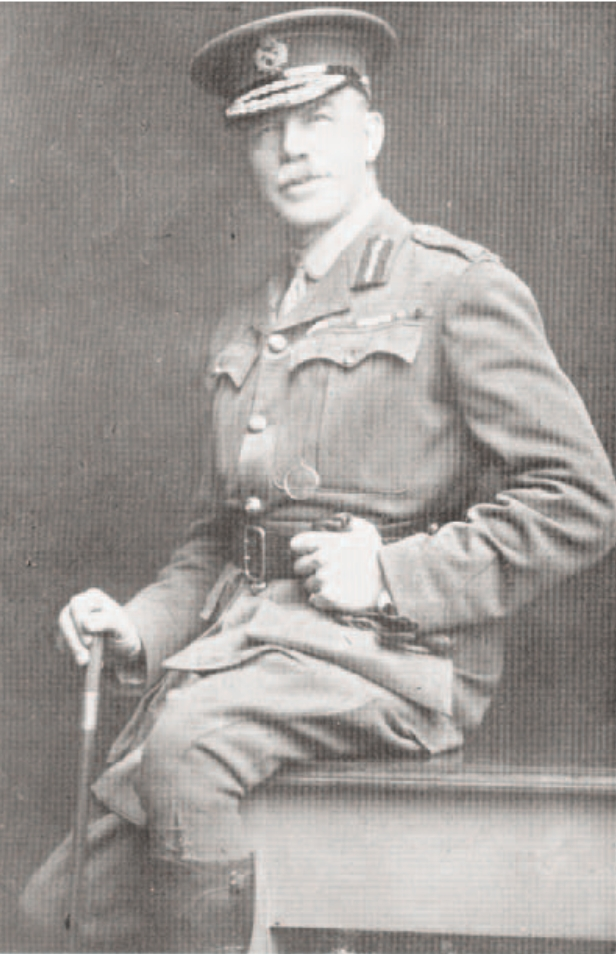

Brigadier General Alain Chartier Joly de Lotbiniere (31 October 1862 – 14 April 1944) was a Canada-born Royal Engineer who served as a chief engineer in India. He was involved in several hydroelectric projects in British India including the setting up of the longest power transmission line in the world at the time in Mysore.

== Life and work ==
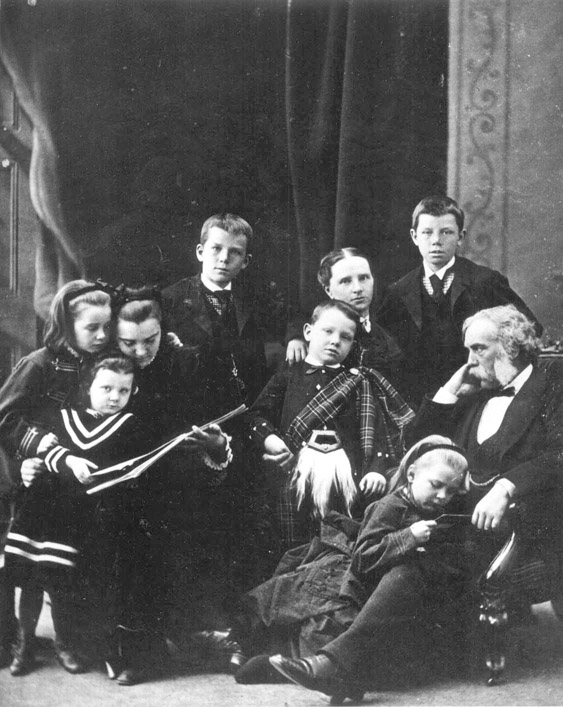
In childhood. Standing rightmost. c. 1875

Joly de Lotbiniere (known to his friends as "Lobo") was born in Quebec, the second son of Sir Henry Gustave Joly de Lotbiniere and Margaretta Josepha Gowen. He was educated at the Bishops College School, Lennoxville, and the Royal Marines College, Kingston Canada in 1883. He served for two years with the Canadian Pacific Railways Workshops hoping to become a mechanical engineer. In 1885 the British Government increased Canadian positions in the army due to the fear of a war with Russia. He then joined the Royal Engineers in 1886 becoming a captain in 1895 and major in 1903. He went to India in 1887 and was involved in the construction of a lighthouse at Manora, Karachi, on the Rawalpindi defences, Murree water supplies, and the Bangalore city water supply. In 1898 he was moved to the Home Establishment and became an instructor at the school of mechanical engineering. In 1899 he was called to Mysore as deputy chief engineer in the Mysore Durbar serving under the chief engineer McNeill Campbell. In 1902 he was involved in establishing the Cauvery Falls power transmission line from Sivasamudram to the Kolar Gold Fields at a cost of £340,000. It was the first large hydroelectric transmission line scheme in Asia and the longest in the world at the time. He was promoted to major in 1903 and was invited by the Kashmir Durbar of Maharaja Pratap Singh to examine hydroelectric power. He set up electric lights in the palace and in some European establishments by 1904. The Mohra hydropower project near Varmul on the River Jhelum was conceptualized in 1904 and completed in 1908. It was also intended to power the Abbotabad-Srinagar railways and in 1906 he was appointed chief engineer, Kashmir State Public Works. He was involved in dredging the outlet of Wular lake to reclaim marshes and to reduce flooding risk. In 1913 he was transferred to Bengal. In 1914 he was selected as chief engineer for the Anzac Corps at Cairo to defend the Suez Canal. He then moved to France and then moved to his home establishment as chief engineer eastern command until he retired with the temporary rank of major general in 1919 in England. He died at Greystoke, Berkshire.

He received Companion of the Most Eminent Order of the Indian Empire in 1905 and a Kaiser-i-Hind gold medal in 1903. He married Marion Helen daughter of Colonel J. Campbell in 1887 who died twelve days after the death of her husband.
