= New Memon Masjid =

Mosque in Karachi, Pakistan

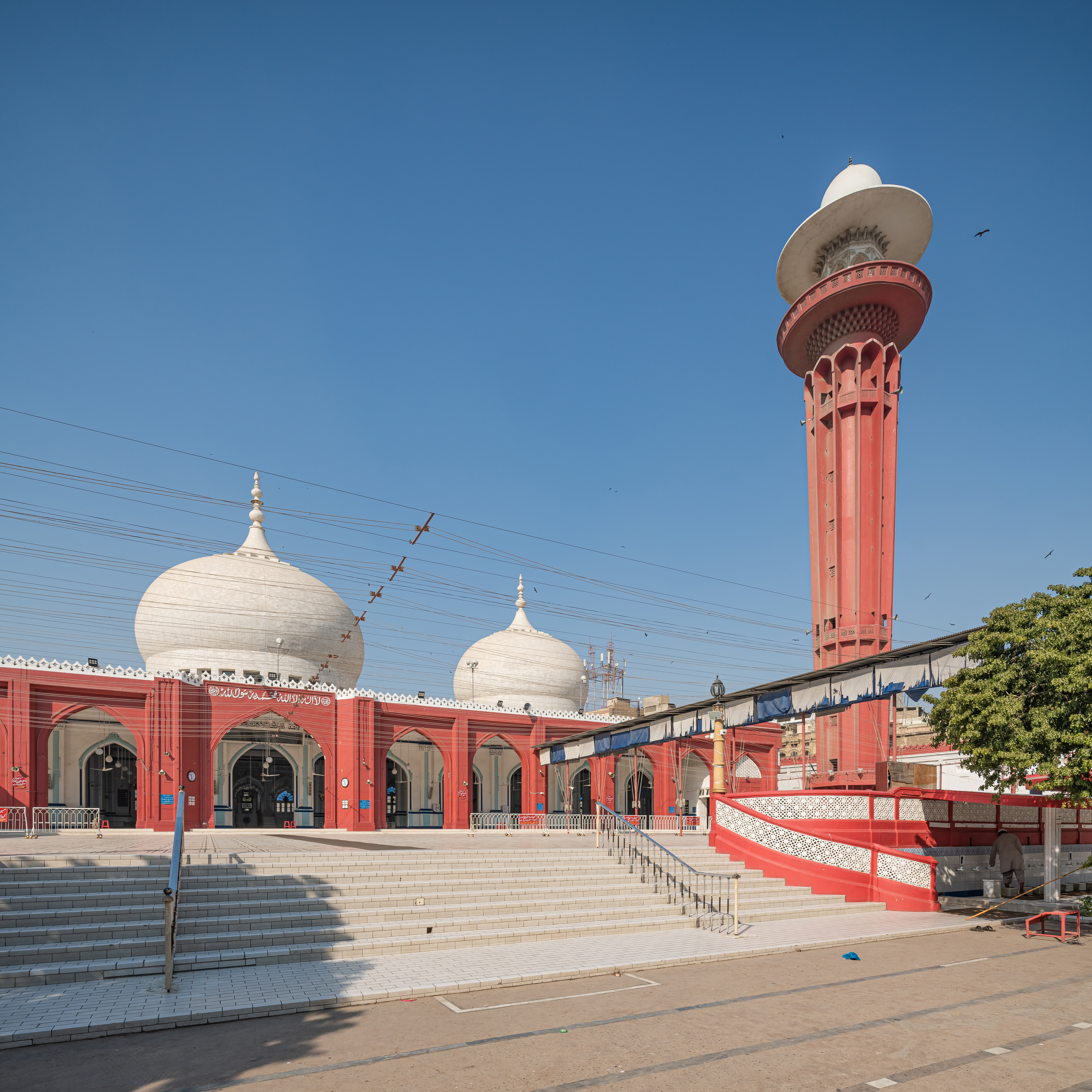

Religion
- Affiliation: Sunni Islam
- Province: Sindh

Location
- Location: Karachi
- Country: Pakistan
- Interactive map of New Memon Masjid
- Coordinates: 24.8514°N 67.0001°E

Architecture
- Established: 1949

The New Memon Masjid (Urdu: نئی میمن مسجد) known as the Memon Masjid is a mosque located in Karachi, Pakistan. It is one of the largest and oldest mosques in the city.

The first committee of the Memon Masjid was formed on 17 September 1948, The First Adhan, also known as Azan or Azaan was given on 15 July 1949. The Foundation-Stone was laid on 24 August 1949 By the Governor General Khuwaja Nazim UD Din.

== History ==
The New Memon Masjid was built when Pakistan did not come into existence, it is said by the people that this Masjid was built over a graveyard. Capacity is now increasing of mosque according to the survey few years ago the capacity of people was 10000. New Memon Masjid is also famous for performing Nikah as people from Memon community perform their Nikah in this Masjid.
