= Karachi Dock Labour Board =

The Karachi Dock Labour Board (KDLB) is responsible for labour relations between employees and the Karachi Port Trust. The KDLB was formed in 1973 to provide dock workers with a rotational system of employment at the docks. In 2006, the World Bank recommended closing the KDLB as part of an overhaul of the Karachi Port operations.

== See also ==
- Karachi Port Trust
