= Baba and Bhit Islands =

Coordinates: 24.821°N 66.962°E

Baba and Bhit Islands جزیرہ بابا بھٹ
- Neighbourhood
- Interactive map of Baba and Bhit Islands جزیرہ بابا بھٹ
- Country: Pakistan
- Province: Sindh
- Division: Karachi Division
- District: Orangi District
- Time zone: UTC+5 (PST)
- Postal code: 75300

Baba and Bhit Islands (Urdu: جزیرہ بابا بھٹ) are two small and densely populated islands located in the Karachi Harbour, in Karachi, Pakistan. The approximate area of Bhit island is roughly 0.16 km^{2} while that of Baba island is around 0.15 km^{2}. Around 5,400 people live on Bhit island and around 6,600 on Baba island. With a population density of 33,750 and 44,000 people per km^{2} respectively, the two islands are among the most densely populated islands in the world.

The islands are connected to Karachi via a ferry service to Keamari.

The islands, along with Shams Pir island, are old fishing villages in the harbor which predate the formal establishment of Karachi. The two islands are said to be over 400 years old. The ethnic groups in Baba and Bhit Islands include Sindhis and Kutchis. The entire population is Muslim. The local fishermen refer to themselves as Morrio Pata. Villagers from these islands later helped settle the slightly bigger Shams Pir island.

== See also ==
- List of islands of Pakistan
