= Kharadar =

Kharadar کھارادر
- Neighbourhood
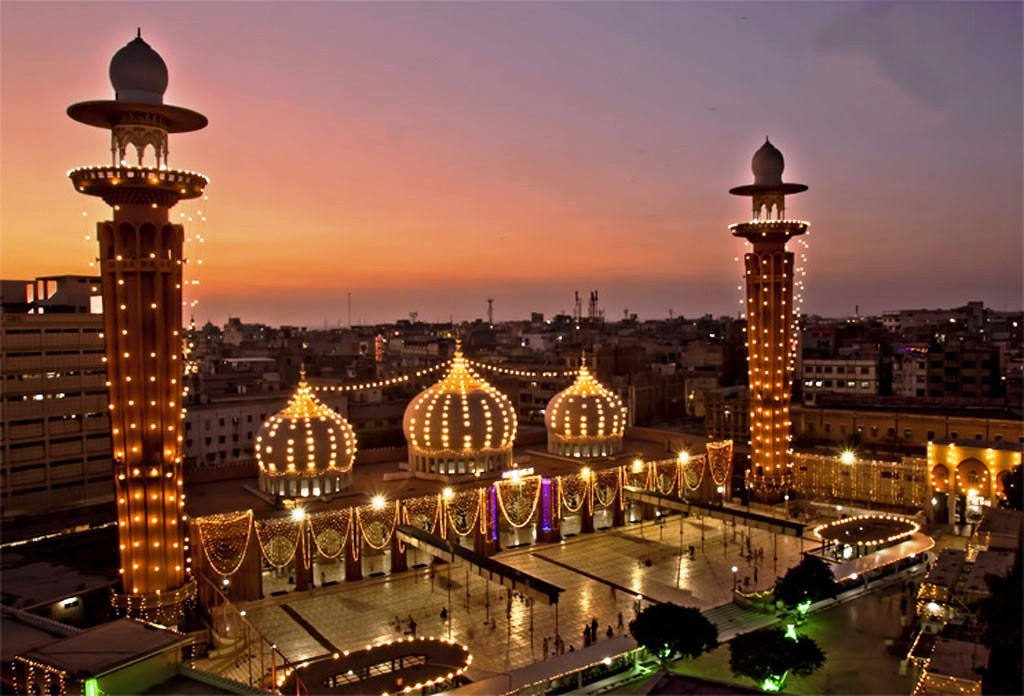
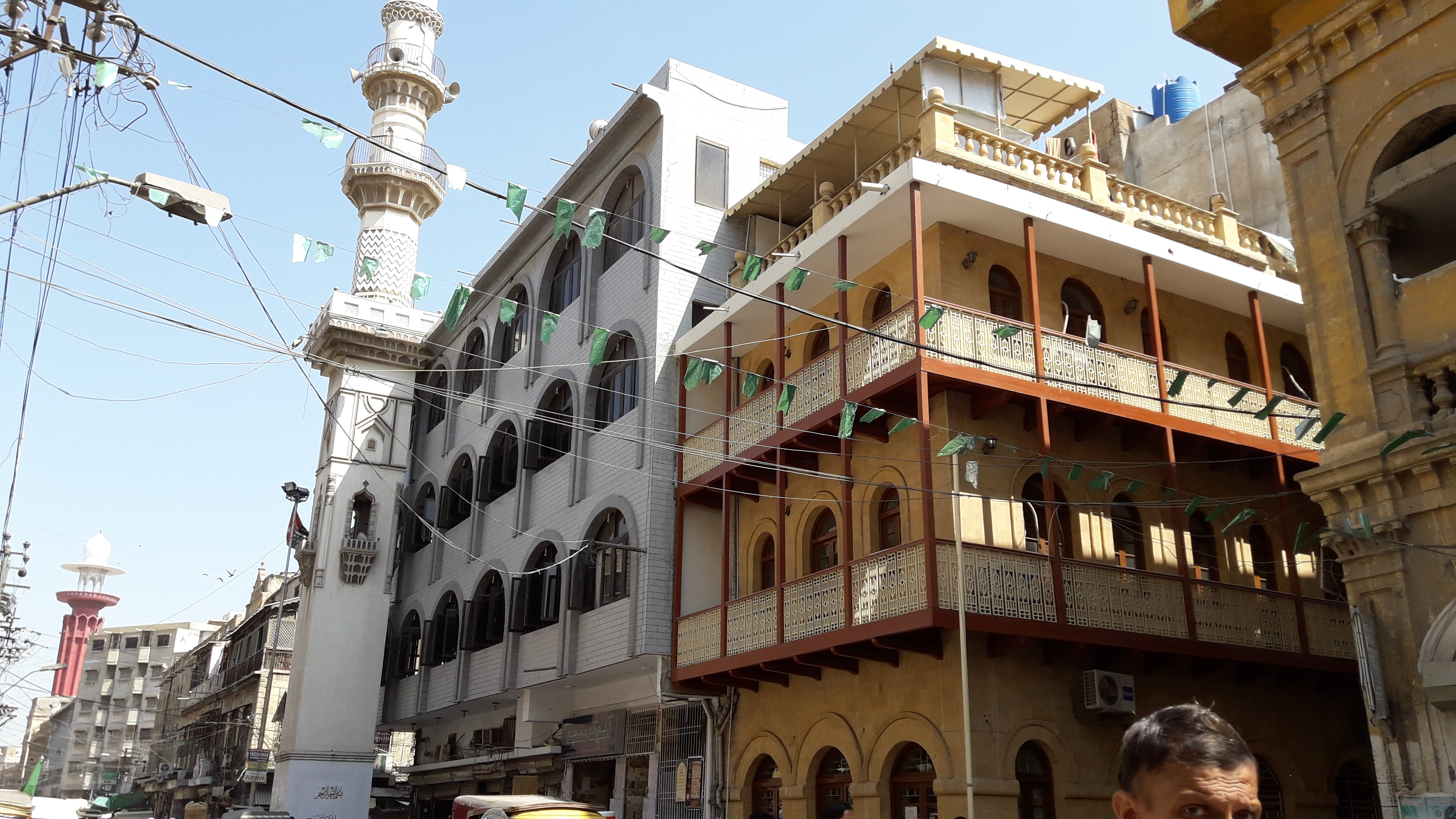
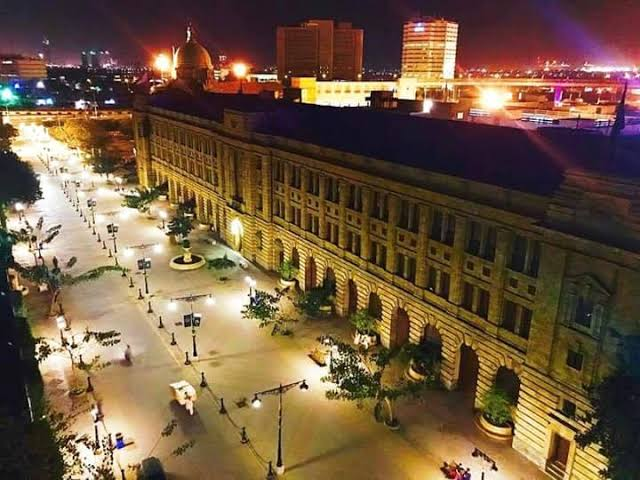
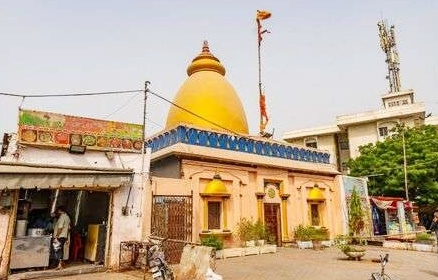
- Clockwise from top: New Memon Masjid, Darya Lal Mandir, Quaid-e-Azam Birthplace Museum, Custom House
- Country: Pakistan
- Province: Sindh
- City: Karachi

Government
  - Constituency: NA-247 (Karachi South-II)
  - National Assembly Member: Aftab Siddiqui (PTI)

Kharadar (Urdu: کھارادر) is a neighbourhood in District South of Karachi, Pakistan. Kharadar and the adjacent communities of Mithadar and Jodia Bazaar together form what is regarded as the original core of Karachi.

== Etymology ==
Kharadar means Brackish Gate in Urdu and ‘‘Saltwater Gate’’ in Sindhi.

== Location ==
Kharadar is located in central Karachi, near the Port of Karachi. Together with the adjacent community of Mithadar, it forms what is regarded as the original core of Karachi, when the city was known as "Kalachi Jo Goath." The combined area of the two is approximately 35 square kilometers.

== History ==
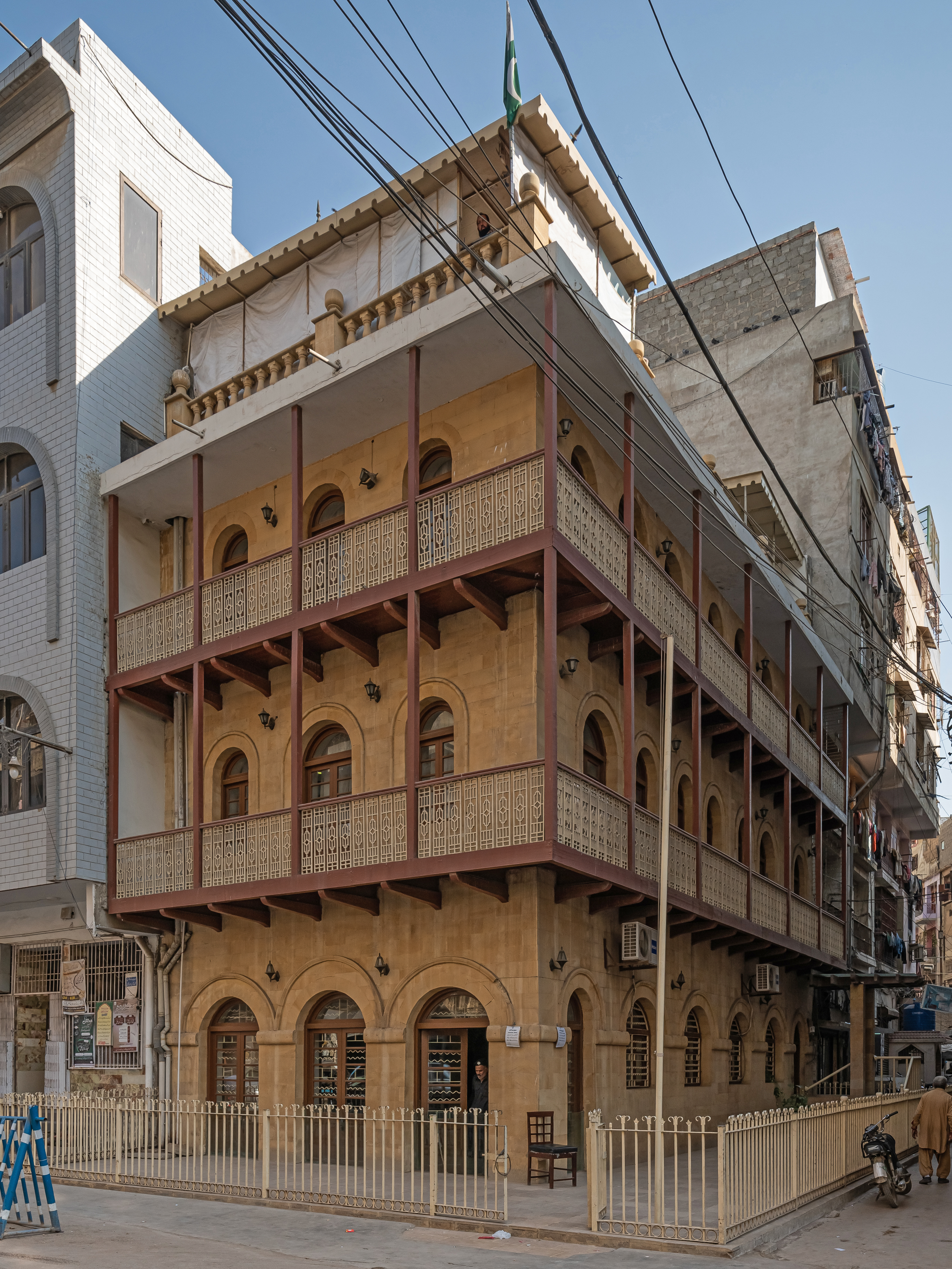
The Wazir Mansion, birthplace of Pakistan's founder Muhammed Ali Jinnah is located in Kharadar

The neighbourhood was named after one of two gates to the old city of Karachi built in 1729 – the other being Mitha Dar or "Sweet Gate," (referring to the potable, fresh water of the Lyari River) which is now the name of the neighborhood adjacent to the northern edge of Kharadar. Both gates were torn down in 1860 after the British conquered Sindh 13 years earlier.

== Economy ==
Kharadar, along with Mithadar, is a center for Karachi's textile industry, with several garment factories and wholesalers located in the adjacent Bolton Markets, as well as numerous textile markets along Laxmi Das Street. Kharadar has also been home to a Muslim South Indian community since the 1890s – a legacy reflected in the name of the nearby market, the Cochinwala Markets named after residents of the city of Cochin in South India.

== Demographics ==
Kharadar being the oldest area along with Mithadar and Lyari is known for its diversity and unity. It is home to people from various faiths. The area has Darya Lal Mandir of the Hindu community, Khoja Isna Ashri Masjid of the Shia community and one of the largest Ismaili Jamat Khana, belongs to Nizari Isma'ili community. Ismaili Muslims traders originally settled in Kharadar after having moved from upper and lower Sindh as well as from Kutch, Kathiawar in Gujarat in the 16th and 17th centuries – well before the British Raj. One of the earliest Ismailis in Kharadar, Syed Ghulam Ali Shah or "Ghulmali Shah" of the Kadiwala clan, was a prominent missionary in Sindh, Kutch and Kathiawar. He died in Karachi in 1792 when there were only a handful of Ismailis. Rather than being buried amongst a small community, his body was transported to Kera in Gujarat for burial. The Ismaili community in Kharadar grew rapidly following a famine in Kutch in 1820, during which 250 Ismailis families fled the area to settle in Kharadar, where they built their first house of worship in the Kagzi Bazar ("Paper Market") in 1825. The area housed the headquarters of the Ismaili faith in Pakistan, until they were moved north to Garden. Kharadar also has a large Memon community.

== Tourism ==
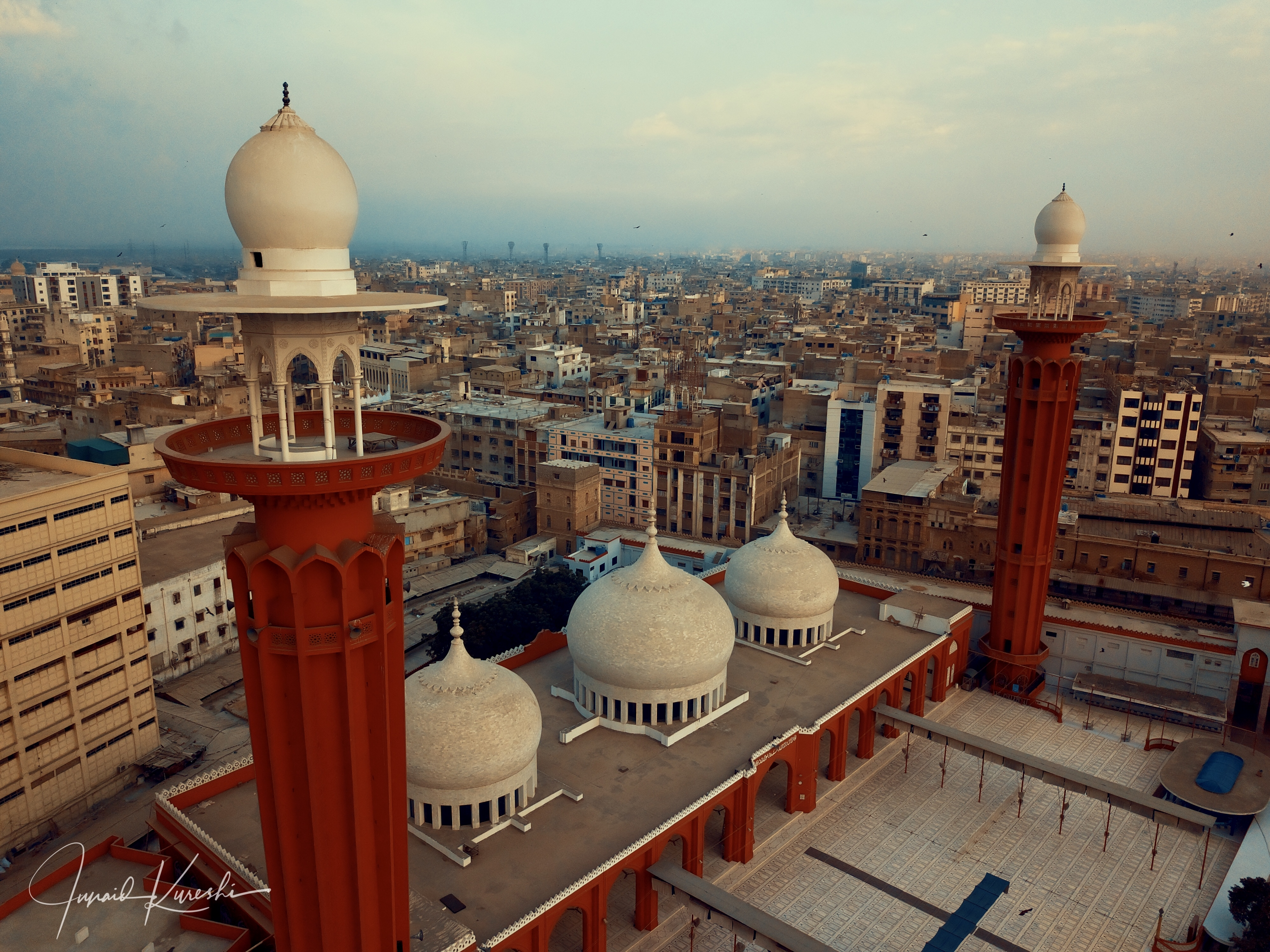
New Memon Masjid

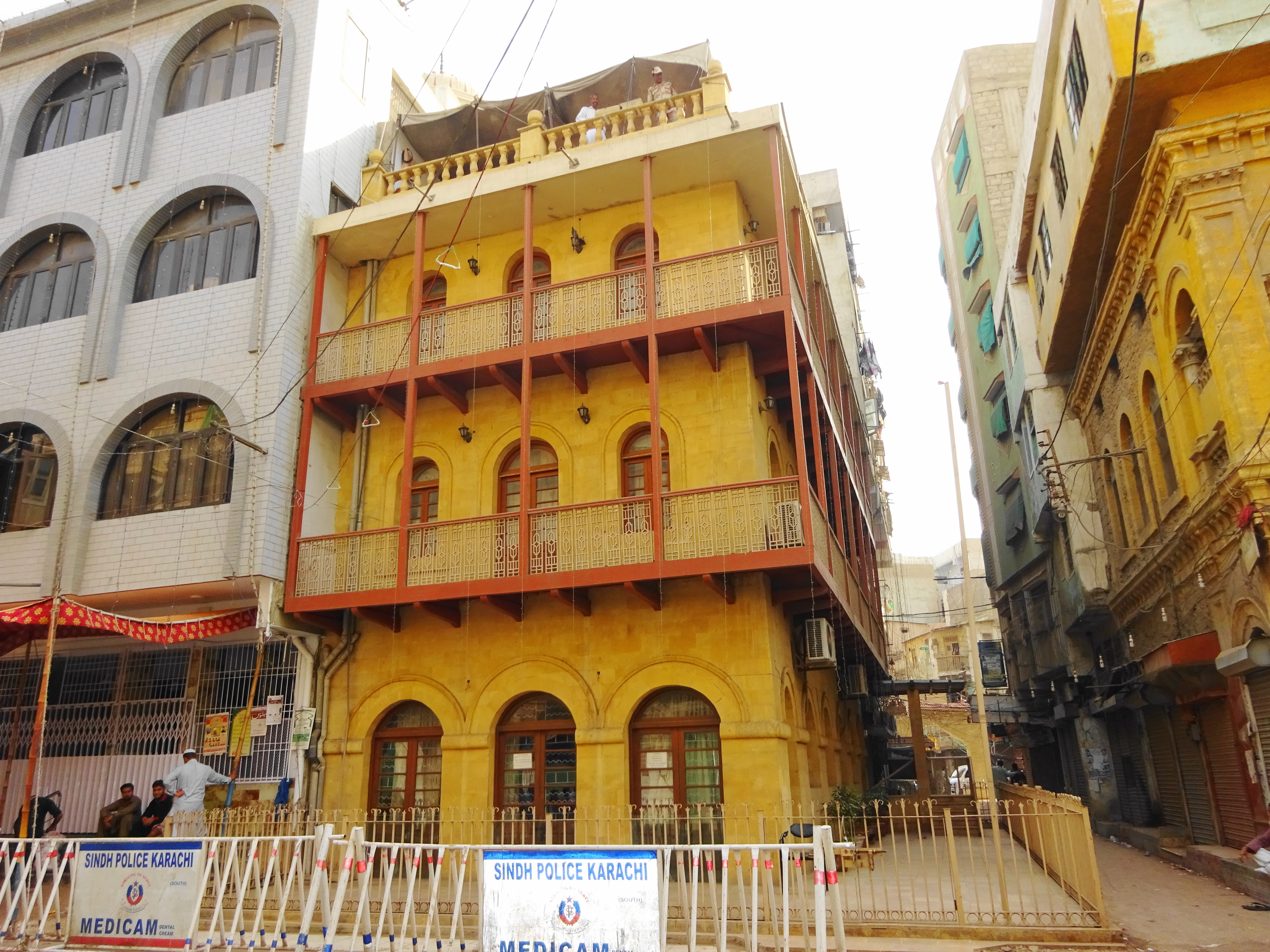
Wazir Mansion

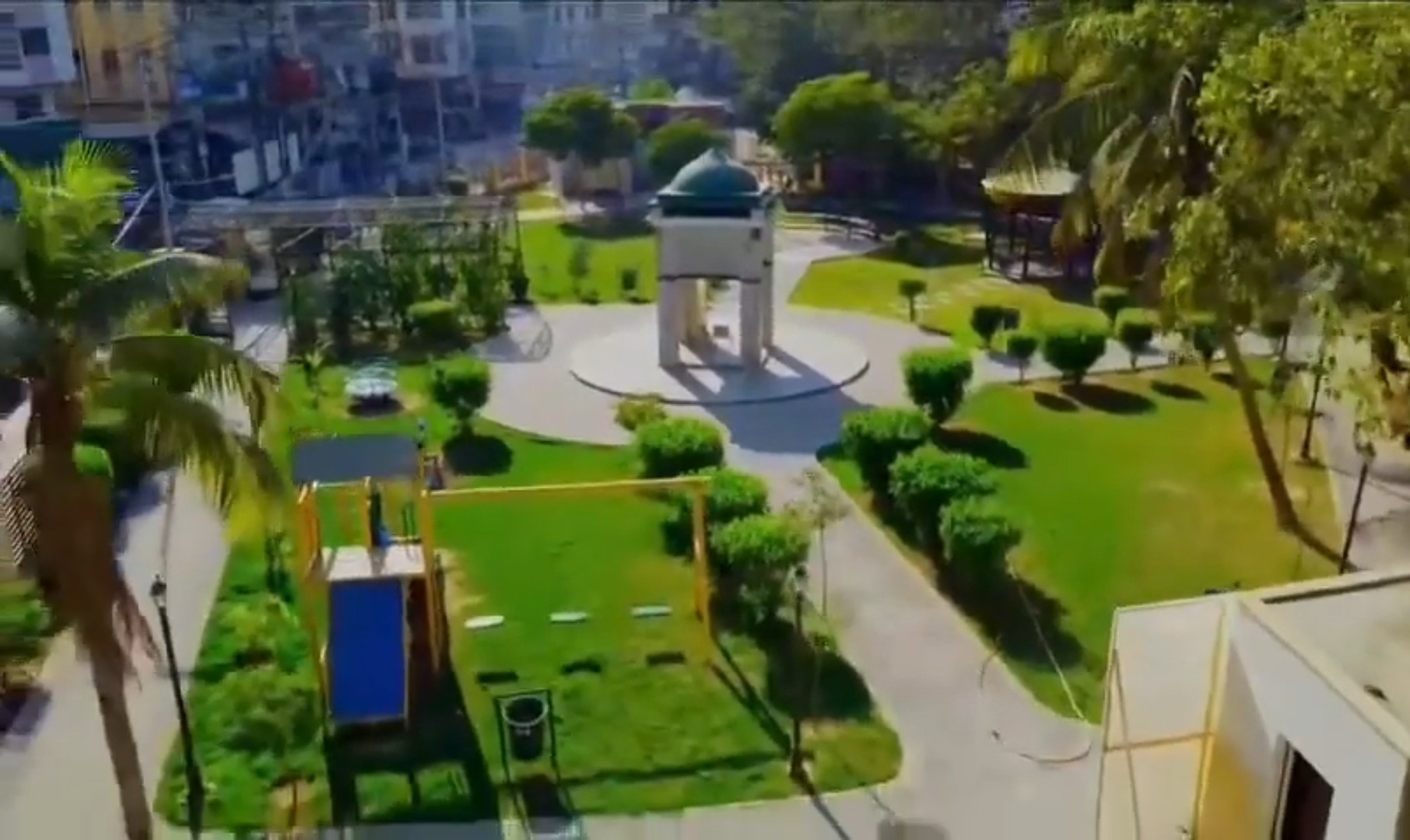
Allah Rakha Park

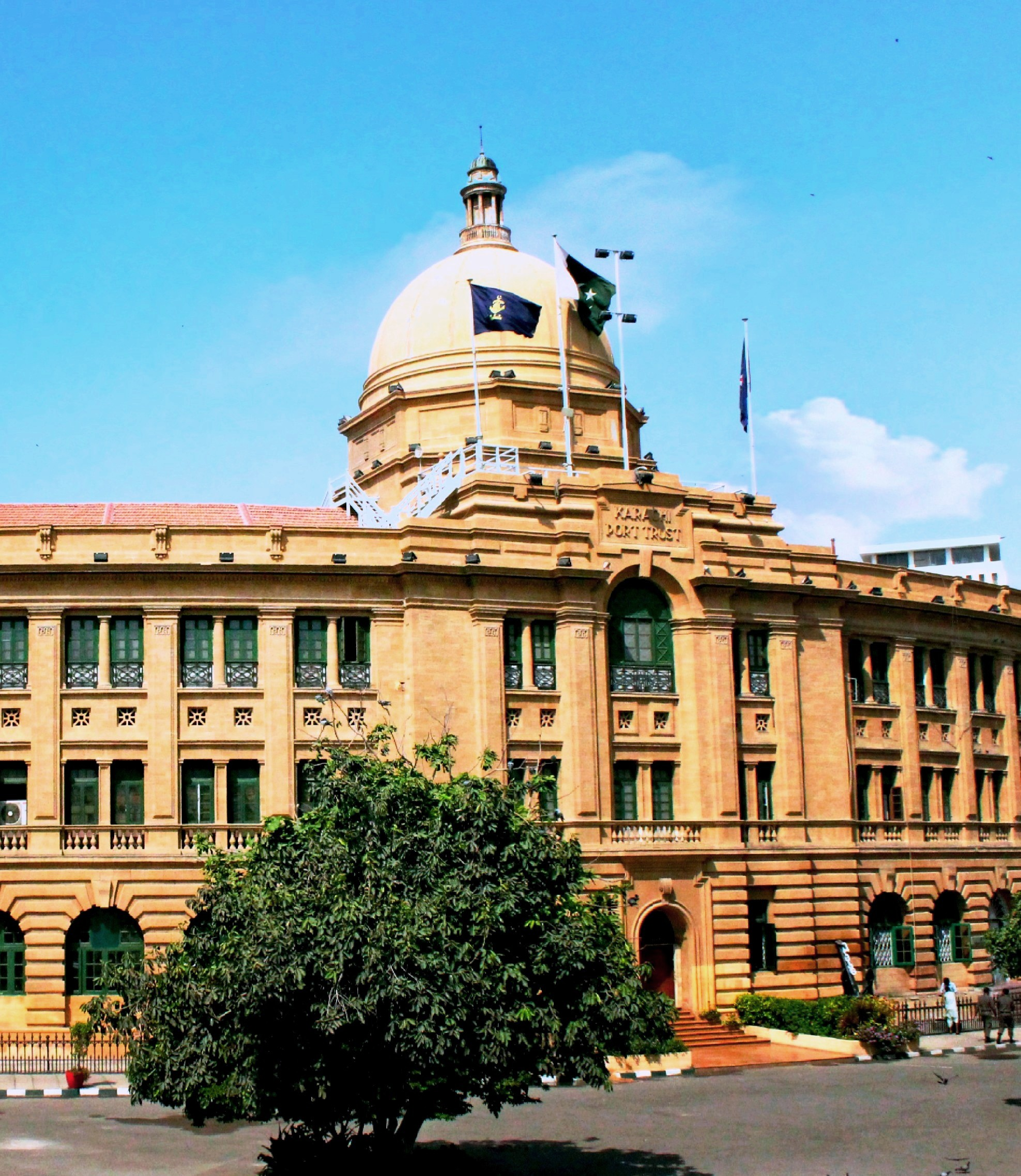
Karachi Port Trust

Kharadar remains a major tourist destination in Karachi. The New Memon Masjid's Foundation-Stone was laid on 24 August 1949 By the Governor General Khuwaja Nazim UD Din. It is one of the largest mosque in the city and has a capacity of 10000 people. Among the most popular sights are Wazir Mansion, birthplace of the founder of Pakistan Quaid-e-Azam, Karachi Port Trust Building which administers the Port of Karachi, ancient Hindu temple Darya Lal Mandir and Kharadar JamatKhana which is one of the largest Jamatkhana of Nizari Ismaili community.

== See also ==
- Kharadar General Hospital
- Saddar Town
