= Sandspit Beach =

Beach in Karachi, Sindh, Pakistan

- Beach
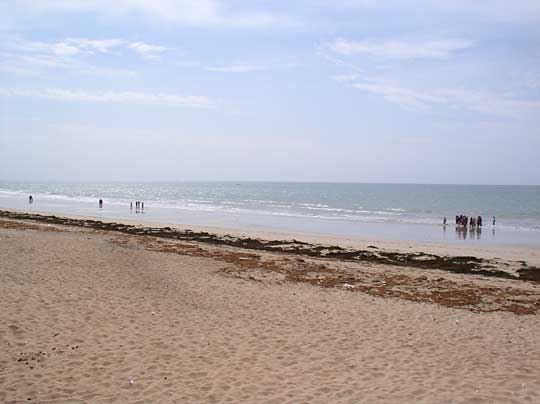
- View of Sandspit Beach

- Location within Sindh Location within Pakistan
- Coordinates: 24.8404°N 66.9098°E
- Location: Karachi, Pakistan

Sandspit Beach is a beach located southwest of Karachi, Sindh, Pakistan.

A remarkable variety of marine life is found here, including algae and crabs. The shallow waters are ideal for swimming and sunbathing. It has an unusual rocky formation. Sandspit Beach is a popular hangout and relaxation spot and a famous tourist spot in Karachi. Facilities at Sandspit Beach include horseback and camel riding.

Sandspit Beach is also a nesting ground for green and olive ridley sea turtles, implemented by the Sindh Wildlife Department over the past two decades. Nesting takes place in early winter months. In recent years WWF-Pakistan has also become involved in turtle conservation activities by establishing a wetland centre at Sandspit Beach.
