= Mithadar =

Mithadar میٹھادر
- Neighbourhood
- Country: Pakistan
- Province: Sindh
- City: Karachi

Government
  - Constituency: NA-247 (Karachi South-II)
  - National Assembly Member: Aftab Siddiqui (PTI)

Mithadar (Urdu: میٹھادر) is one of the neighbourhoods of Saddar Town in Karachi, Sindh, Pakistan, and comprises the oldest part of Karachi that was once encircled by a wall. Mithadar and the adjacent community of Kharadar together form what is regarded as the original core of Karachi.

== Etymology ==
Mithadar literally means Sweet Gate in both Sindhi and Urdu, in reference to the potable, non-saline waters of the Lyari River.

== Location ==
The neighborhood is bordered by Kharadar, Jodia Bazar, and Lyari Town across Embankment Road. The area also at one time was on the banks of the Lyari River, until it shifted course in the 19th century. The combined area of Mithadar and Kharadar is approximately 35 square kilometers.

== History ==
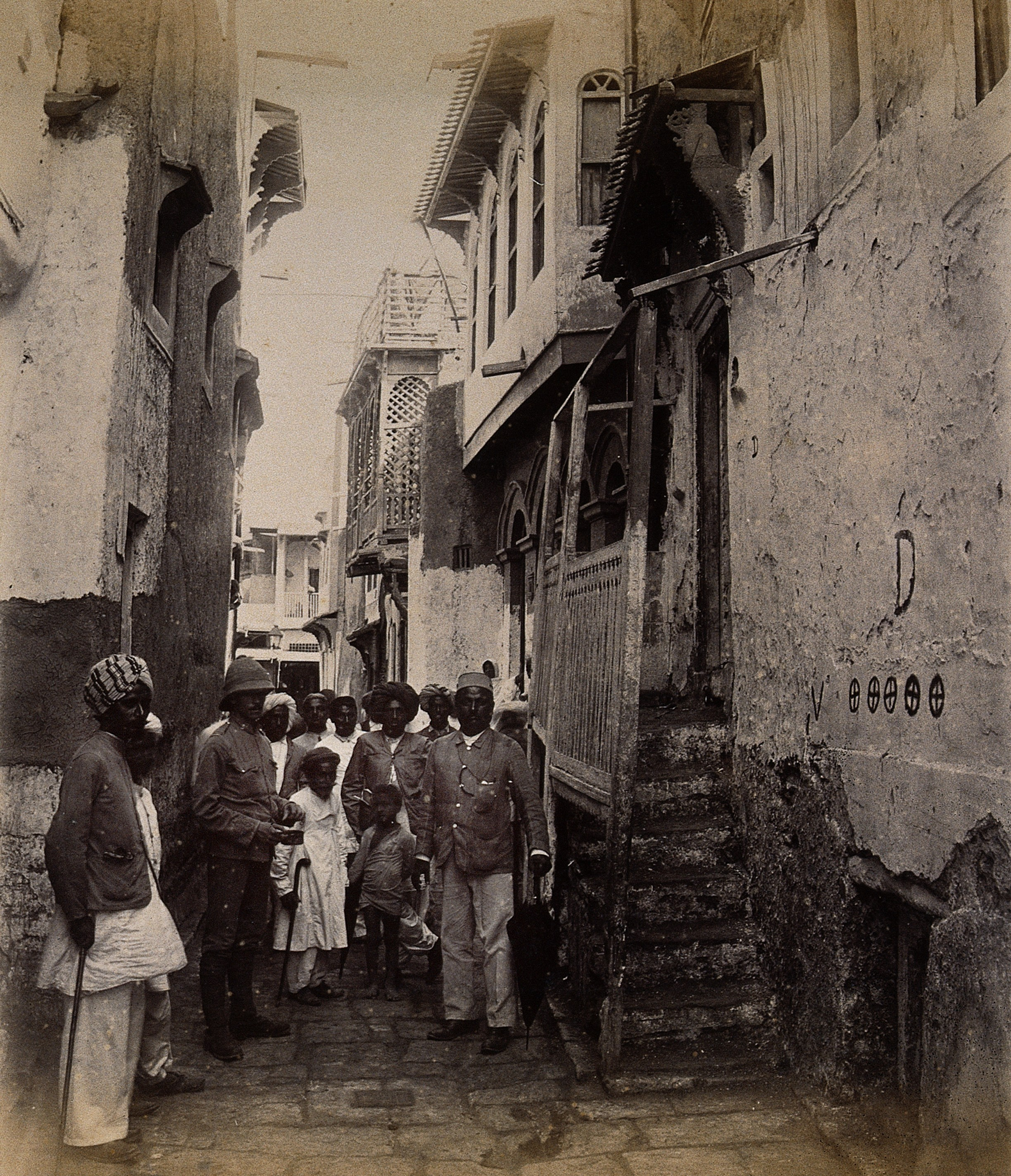
Mithadar in 1897

'Mithadar' literally means Sweet Gate in both Sindhi and Urdu, and was the name of one of two gates in old Karachi - the other being "Khara Darwaza" (Brackish Gate) to the west - now known as Kharadar. Both gates were built in 1729, and were torn down in 1860 after the British conquered Sindh 13 years earlier. Together with the adjoining community of Kharadar, it forms what is regarded as the original core of Karachi, when the city was known as "Kalachi Jo Goath."

== Economy ==
Mithadar was once the epicenter of Karachi's business community before the arrival of the British prompted businessmen to migrate directly east and south to the areas of Saddar, Cantonment, and Bolton Markets. The area is known for its many textile markets that are located in Mithader and the adjoining communities of Kharadar and Bolton Market.

The area was once home to a thriving Hindu business community prior to the independence of Pakistan. Up until independence, the area was a Hindu majority area - a legacy which is still reflected in major street names such as Chandan Mukhi Lane, and Vishramdas Sukhramdas Street. At the eastern end of the neighborhood begins Rampart Row, where elaborate examples of 20th century Sikh and Hindu architecture can still be found. The area is still home to the Devi Mata and Bhagnari Shiv temples.

== See also ==
- Saddar Town
