= Goth (village) =

Goth (Urdu: ـ گوٹھ) means 'village' in Sindhi language. Goth is a prefix or postfix commonly used for village names throughout Sindh and in some parts of Balochistan and Punjab provinces of Pakistan. In Karachi, Goth can also be a small neighborhood populated mainly by the Sindhi people.

Examples include:

- Machi Goth
- Somar Goth
- Abdul Rehman Goth
- Rais Goth
- Pehlwan Goth
- Sohrab goth

== Other parts of region and settlement names ==
- khel (Urdu: خیل) means settlement or town. Example: Darra Adam Khel درہ آدم خیل.
- -abad (Urdu: ـ آباد) means settlement or town. Example: Islamabad, Faisalabad.
- dera- (Urdu: ڈیره ـ) means settlement or town. Example: Dera Ismail Khan.
- -garh (Urdu: ـ گڑھ) means fort or settlement. Example: Islamgarh.
- Goth (Urdu: ـ گوٹھ) means settlement or town. Example: Yousuf Goth.
- -istan (Urdu: ـستان) means land. Example: Pakistan.
- -kot (Urdu: ـکوٹ) means settlement or town. Example: Islamkot, Sialkot.
- -nagar (Urdu: ـ نگر) means settlement or town. Example: Islamnagar.
- -pur (Urdu: ـ پُور) means settlement or town. Example: Nasarpur.
- -wala (Urdu: ـوالا) means settlement or town. Example: Gujranwala.
