= Skender (disambiguation) =

Skender is a male given name.

Skender may also refer to:

== People ==
- Skënder Anamali (1921–1996), Albanian archaeologist and historian
- Skënder Begeja (1924–2010), Albanian footballer
- Skënder Bruçaj (born 1976), Geand Mufti of Albania
- Skënder Gega (born 1963), Albanian footballer and coach
- Skënder Gjinushi (born 1949), Albanian politician
- Skënder Halili (1940–1982), Albanian footballer
- Skënder Hodja (born 1960), Albanian footballer
- Skënder Hyka (1944–2018), Albanian footballer
- Skënder Hyseni (born 1955), Foreign Minister of the Republic of Kosovo
- Skënder Jareci (1931–1984), Albanian footballer and manager
- Skender Kulenović (1910–1978), Yugoslav poet, novelist and dramatist of Bosniak origin
- Skender Loshi (born 1999), Albanian footballer
- Skënder Luarasi (1900–1982), Albanian scholar and activist
- Skënder Muço (1904–1944), Albanian lawyer
- Skender Pasha (fl. 1478–1504), Bosnian sanjakbey
- Skënder Rizaj (1930–2021), Albanian scholar and historian
- Skënder Sallaku (1935–2014), Albanian comedian and actor
- Skënder Shengyli (born 1960), Kosovar Albanian footballer
- Skënder Temali (1946–2021), Albanian writer, poet, prozator, journalist
- Skënder Zogu (born 1933), Albanian author and member of the Royal Family
- Gabrijela Skender (born 1999), Croatian cross-country skier
- Marin Skender (born 1979), Croatian football goalkeeper

== Places ==
- Skenderaj (Albanian: Skënder), a city and municipality in Kosovo
- Skender Vakuf, a town and municipality in central Bosnia and Herzegovina

== Other ==
- Korçë Skënder, a currency used 1921–1926 in the Albanian city of Korçë

== See also ==
- Alexander
- Iskandar (disambiguation)
- İskender (disambiguation)
- Sikandar (disambiguation)
- Skanderbeg (disambiguation)
- Skenderija, a neighborhood in the city of Sarajevo in Bosnia and Herzegovina
