= Eskandari =

Eskandari (Persian: اسکندری), also rendered as Iskandari, may refer to:

== People with the surname Eskandari ==
- Abbas Eskandari (1897–1955) Qajar prince, and Iranian Communist politician.
- Abdollah Eskandari (born 1945), Iranian make-up artist.
- Abdolmajid Eskandari, Iranian academic leader
- Iraj Eskandari (1908–1985), Qajar prince, and Iranian Communist politician.
- Matt Eskandari (21st century), Iranian-American film director and screenwriter.
- Mohammad-Reza Eskandari (20th century), Iranian politician, former Minister of Agriculture
- Mohtaram Eskandari (1895–1924), Iranian intellectual and a pioneer of the Iranian women's movement.
- Setareh Eskandari (born 1974), Iranian actress
- Soleiman Eskandari (1875–1944), Iranian Qajar prince, and Socialist politician

== People with the surname Iskandari ==
- Ibn Ata Allah al-Iskandari (658–709 AH), Egyptian Malikite jurist, muhaddith and the third murshid (spiritual "guide" or "master") of the Shadhili Sufi order.
- Rustam Iskandari (born 1991), Tajikistani freestyle wrestler.
- Sa'id ben Hasan al-Iskandari (fl. 13th–14th centuries), Jewish convert to Islam

== Places ==
- Eskandari, Iran, a village in Kohgiluyeh and Boyer-Ahmad Province, Iran
- Eskandari-ye Baraftab, a village in Isfahan Province, Iran
- Eskandari-ye Barmeyun, a village in Kohgiluyeh and Boyer-Ahmad Province, Iran
- Eskandari-ye Nesa, a village in Isfahan Province, Iran

== See also ==
- Eskandar (disambiguation)
