= Sikandarabad =

Sikandarabad may refer to:

- Sikandarabad, Bhopal, a village in Madhya Pradesh, India
- Sikandrabad, a town in Uttar Pradesh, India
- Secunderabad, a city in Telangana, India
  - Secunderabad (Lok Sabha constituency)
  - Secunderabad (Assembly constituency)
- Sikandarabad, Gilgit–Baltistan, a village in Pakistan
- Sikandrabad Colony, Abbottabad, a locality in Pakistan
- Gulshan-e-Sikandarabad, a neighbourhood of Karachi in Pakistan
- Sikandarabad, Sindh, a union council of Khairpur District, Pakistan

== See also ==
- Sikandarpur (disambiguation)
- Sikanderpur (disambiguation)
- Sikandar (disambiguation)
