= Iskandar (name) =

Iskandar, Iskander, Skandar, Skander, Askandar, Askander, Eskandar, Eskender, Eskinder, Iskinder, Sikandar, Sikander, Skandier, Scandar, Scander or İskender (Arabic: إسكندر; Amharic: እስክንድር eskinder; Persian: اسکندر Eskandar or سکندر Skandar), is a variant of the given name Alexander in cultures such as Iran (Persia), Arabia and others throughout the Middle East, North East Africa, South Asia, Caucasus, Volga region and Central Asia. In Egypt, its bearers are mostly of Christian (Coptic) descent. Originally referring to Alexander the Great, it was transmitted through works such as the Iskandarnameh and the Sirr al-Asrar, and became a popular name for rulers in the medieval period.

The Arabic version may also add the definite-article prefix al-, giving al-ʾiskandar (Arabic: الاسكندر,الإِسْكَنْدَر). al-Iskandarīyah ("of Alexander") is the Arabic name of the Egyptian city of Alexandria.

== Given name ==
=== Iskandar ===
- Sultan Iskandar (disambiguation), names of several Muslim rulers who share the same title and name
- Iskandar-i Shaykhi (died 1403), ruler of the Afrasiyab dynasty from 1393 to 1403. He was the son and successor of Kiya Afrasiyab
- Iskandar (Timurid dynasty) (1384–1415), ruler of Persia
- Iskandar Dzhalilov (born 1992), Tajikistani footballer
- Iskandar Ghanem (1911–2005), Lebanese army general
- Iskandar Jalil (born 1940), Singaporean ceramist
- Iskandar Khatloni (1954–2000), Tajikistani journalist
- Iskandar Muda (c. 1583 – c. 1636), sultan of Aceh
- Iskandar bin Rahmat (1979–2025), convicted murderer and former police officer in Singapore
- Iskandar Ramis (born 1946), vice governor of Bengkulu
- Iskandar Safa (1955–2024), Lebanese-French businessman
- Iskandar Thani (1610–1641), sultan of Aceh
- Jalal al-Dawla Iskandar (died 1359), ruler of the Paduspanid dynasty
- Muhammad Iskandar bin Sa'at, Singaporean criminal

=== Iskander ===
- Iskander Hachicha (born 1972), Tunisian judoka
- Iskander Mirza (1899–1969), first President of the Republic of Pakistan
- Ibrahim Iskander ll (1707-?), the sultan of the Maldives
- Sultan Iskander Mastura Kudarat III (died 1938) was the last sultan of the Sultanate of Maguindanao
- Sultan Iskander Kudarat II (died 1853 or 1854) sultan of the Sultanate of Maguindanao

=== Iskinder ===
- Iskinder Desta (1934–1974), member of the Ethiopian Imperial family and naval officer.

=== Eskandar ===
- Eskandar Shora (fl. 1948), Iranian boxer

=== Eskender ===
- Eskender Mustafaiev (born 1981), Russian-Ukrainian paralympic swimmer.
- Eskender (Kwestantinos II or Constantine II) (1471–1494), Emperor of Ethiopia.

=== Eskinder ===
- Eskinder Nega (born 1969), Ethiopian journalist.

=== Scandar ===
- Scandar Copti (born 1975), Palestinian Israeli filmmaker

=== Skandar ===
- Skandar Keynes (born 1991), English political advisor and former actor

=== Others ===
- Skanderbeg (1405–1468), 15th century war lord and national hero of Albania

== Surname ==
=== Iskandar ===
- Afifa Iskandar (1921–2012), Iraqi singer
- Anang Iskandar (born 1956), Indonesian police officer
- Azri Iskandar (born 1968), Malaysian actor
- Charbel Iskandar (born 1966), Lebanese actor
- Djoko Iskandar (born 1950), Indonesian zoologist
- Georges Iskandar (born 1968), Lebanese Melkite Greek Catholic archbishop
- Irawati Iskandar (born 1969), Indonesian tennis player
- Layla Iskandar (born 2002), Lebanese footballer
- Mohd Azlan Iskandar (born 1982), Malaysian squash player
- Muhaimin Iskandar (born 1966), Indonesian politician and government minister
- Noer Muhammad Iskandar (1955–2020), Indonesian Islamic cleric
- Nouri Iskandar (born 1938), Syrian musicologist and composer
- Nur Iskandar (born 1986), Indonesian footballer
- Samih Abdel Fattah Iskandar, Jordanian scout official
- Syaiful Iskandar (born 1985), Singaporean footballer

=== Iskander ===
- Abdur Razzaq Iskander (1935–2021), Pakistani Islamic scholar
- Amin Iskander (born 1952), Egyptian politician, writer and activist
- Fazil Iskander (1929–2016), Soviet Russian novelist
- Laila Iskander, Egyptian entrepreneur and politician
- Magda Iskander, Egyptian entrepreneur
- Maryana Iskander (born 1975), CEO of the Wikimedia Foundation
- Qara Iskander (died 1436), ruler of the Kara Koyunlu
- Sayeed Iskander (1953–2012), Bangladeshi army major and politician
- Willem Iskander (1840–1876), Indonesian writer, nationalist, teacher and educator

=== Scandar ===
- Georges Scandar (1927–2018), Lebanese Maronite bishop

== Military ==
- 9K720 Iskander, a Russian missile system.

== See also ==
- İskender (disambiguation)
- Skander
- Skanderbeg (disambiguation)
- Sikandar or Sikander
