= Sikandarpur (disambiguation) =

Sikandarpur is a union council in Haripur District, Khyber Pakhtunkhwa, Pakistan.

Sikandarpur may also refer to:

- Sikandarpur, Jagatpur, Raebareli, a village in Uttar Pradesh, India
- Sikandarpur, Mainpuri, a village in Uttar Pradesh, India
- Sikandarpur, Rahi, a village in Uttar Pradesh, India
- Sikandarpur, Sikandarpur Sarausi, a village in Uttar Pradesh, India
- Sikandarpur, Tadiyawan, a village in Uttar Pradesh, India

== See also ==
- Sikanderpur (disambiguation)
- Sikandarabad (disambiguation)
- Sikandar or Sikander
