= Gulshan-e-Sikandarabad =

Neighbourhood of Karachi in Pakistan

Gulshan-e-Sikandarabad (گلشن سکندرآباد) is a village and neighbourhood of Keamari Town in the southern part of Karachi, Sindh, Pakistan.

It is densely populated area of Keamari District of southern Karachi, characterized by katchi abadis (informal settlements).

== Location ==
Sikandarabad is situated in the Keamari area, near the Karachi port. It is located on the southern bank of the Chinna Creek. It is bordered by the creek to the north, Boat Basin the east, Clifton and Shirin Jinnah Colony to the South and Bhutta Village to the west.

== Demographics and Community ==
It is primarily a low-to-middle-income area mainly consisting of informal settlements and congested residential blocks

== Land Ownership Issues ==
Much of the land officially belongs to the Karachi Port Trust (KPT). However land mafia largely controls the area and in the past headed by Sikander Jadoon led extensive encroachment and reclamation of the creek to expand the land area.

Over time the area has grown through informal expansion, "china cutting" (illegal subdivision of land) and encroachment on the adjoining Chinna Creek, making formal urban planning nearly impossible.

The leader of the land mafia group, Sikandar Jadoon, first attacked on KPT Estate Manager and Judicial Magistrate through direct firing from automatic weapons while officials were monitoring the area. An FIR number 187/2011 was registered against him in Jackson Police Station. Couple of days later, the mafia under the leadership of Sikandar Jadoon took under siege the joint check post of Police and Port Security Force (PSF) and put it on fire. They even opened fire on officials of PSF KPT, including a DSP and three SHOs of the area. KPT again registered an FIR number 235/11 in Jackson Police Station against the mafia group.

The Mukhtyar Kar also registered an FIR number 22/2011 against Sikandar Jadoon according to prevailing rules and regulations of Anti Encroachment Act incorporated under the Board of Revenue, however, so far it resulted in no arrests. The eastern backwaters form an important reservoir for maintaining the hydraulic regime of the harbour.
