= Skander =

Skander is both a given name and a surname. Notable people with the name include:

== Given name ==
- Skander Djamil Athmani, (born 1992), Algerian athlete
- Skander Cheikh (born 1987), Tunisian footballer
- Skander Kasri (born 1958), Tunisian football manager
- Skander Mansouri (born 1995), Tunisian tennis player
- Skander Missaoui (fl. 2014), Tunisian wrestler
- Skander Souayah (born 1972), Tunisian footballer
- Skander Zaïdi (born 1997), Tunisian handball player

== Surname ==
- Abdelhamid Skander (born 1928), Algerian footballer
- Sadri Skander (born 1982), Tunisian TV presenter

== See also ==
- Iskandar (name)
- Gjergj Kastrioti (1405-1468), aka Skanderbeg, Albanian nobleman, military leader and folk hero
