= Goth Haji Salar =

Coordinates: 24°51′N 66°55′E

Goth Haji Salar is a village and neighbourhood of Keamari Town in Karachi, Sindh, Pakistan.
