= Goth Mauladad =

Neighbourhood of Keamari Town in Sindh, Pakistan

Coordinates: 24°51′N 66°55′E

Goth Mauladad is a neighbourhood of Keamari Town in the southern part of Karachi, in Sindh, Pakistan.
