= Boat Basin =

Water body in Karachi

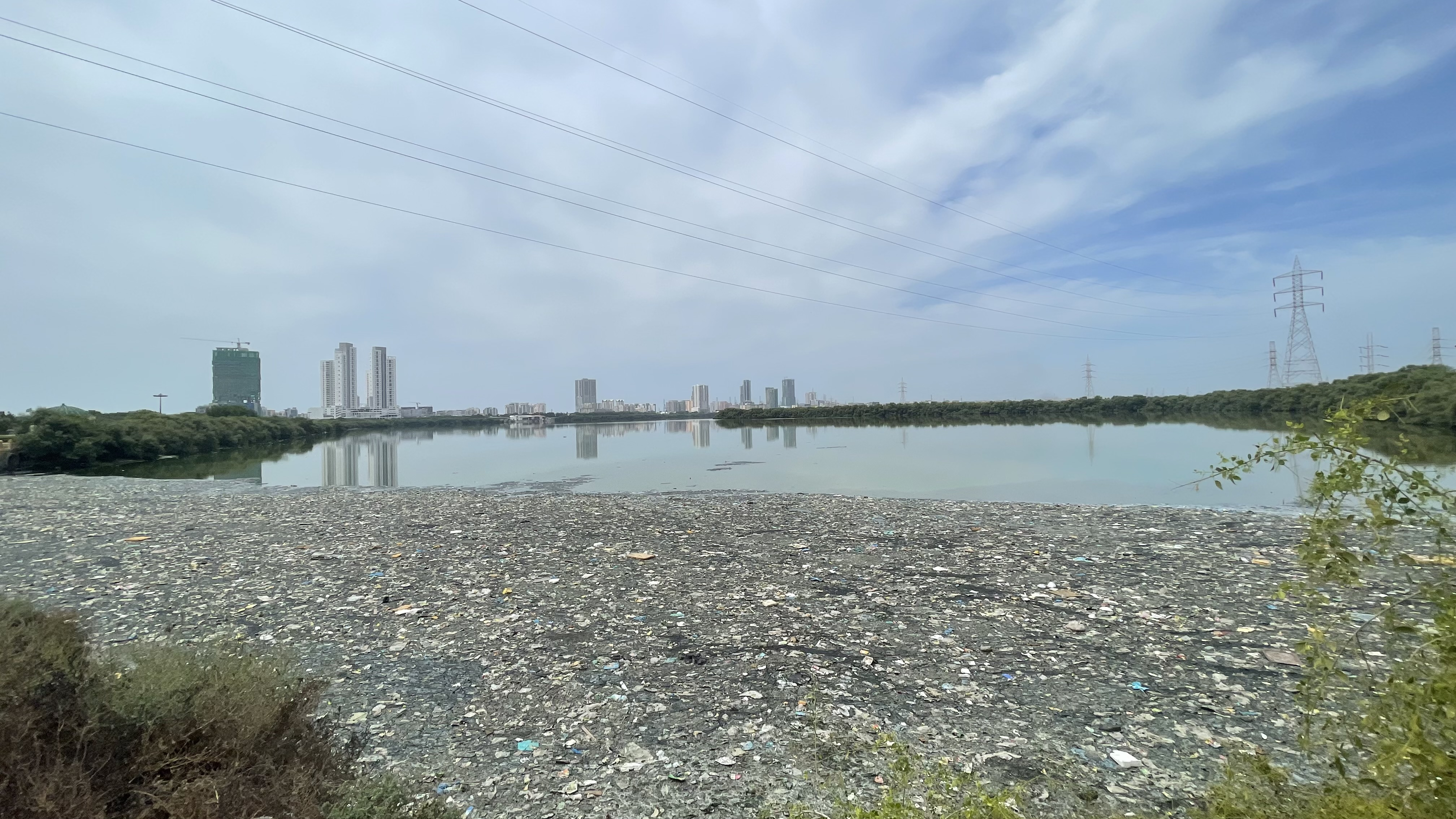
- The vista across the Boat Basin from the north to the southwest.

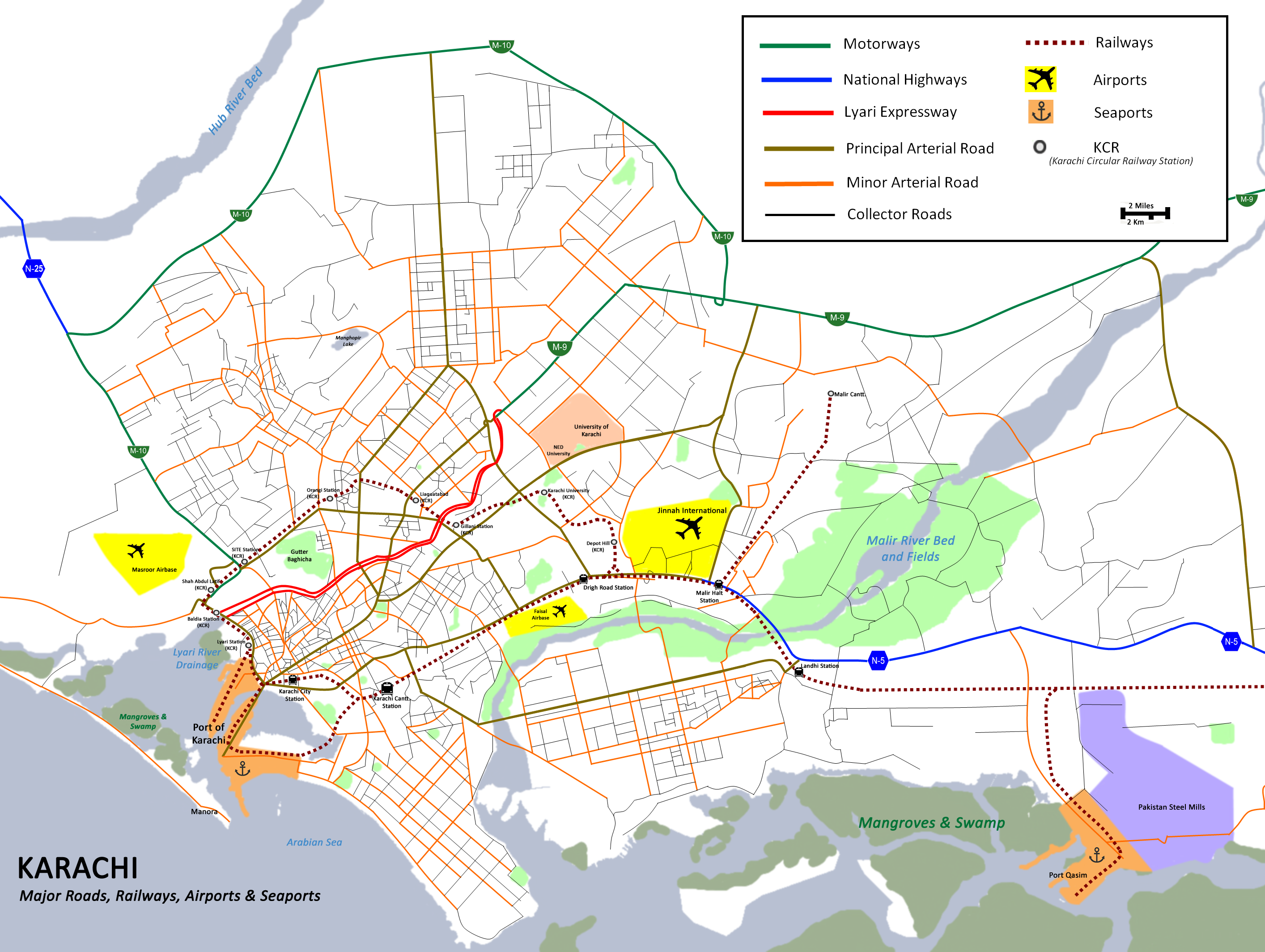
- Location within Karachi Location within Sindh Location within Pakistan
- Location: Sindh
- Coordinates: 24.821°N 67.018°E
- Type: Artificial
- Primary inflows: Nehr-e-Khayyam
- Primary outflows: Chinna Creek
- Basin countries: Pakistan
- Max. length: 1.6 kilometres (0.99 mi)
- Max. width: 0.5 kilometres (0.31 mi)
- Surface elevation: 0 m (0 ft)
- Settlements: Clifton, Karachi

The Boat Basin (Urdu: بوٹ بیسن), located in Clifton, Karachi, is a small human-made sea inlet in Pakistan.

== Location ==
Connected to Chinna Creek on its western side, it is bordered by Boat Basin Park along its northern and eastern waterfronts, running parallel to Kheyaban-e-Saadi. Near Karachi Grammar School, wastewater channel from Nehr-e-Khayyam flows in, contributing to water pollution.

The National Sailing Center is located on the southern side, where there are some remains of mangroves, while the western side is bordered by a railway line, separating the densely populated Sikanderabad settlement from the waters.

== History ==
The Boat Basin, extending westward from Chinna Creek, has experienced gradual degradation, attributed to human interventions dating back to the 19th century. Driven by economic motives to optimise harbour utilisation, alterations were made to reduce tidal differences, thereby affecting the natural flow of sea water into the Basin. Consequently, Clifton and Keamari, initially islands and natural swamps, became connected to the eastern and northern coastland, respectively, forming the current basin but disrupting the crucial influx of fresh seawater. This was part of the land reclamation under the British in Karachi between 1916 and 1920.

== Environmental Challenges ==
The Boat Basin, serving as a crucial link between neighbouring blackwater drainages such as the Nehr-e-Khayyam, is a focal point for the accumulation of untreated wastewater and toxic waste, precipitating the degradation and loss of its natural flora and fauna. Studies have shed light on the alarming pollution levels within the creek, uncovering a diverse range of hazardous pollutants stemming from domestic and semi-industrial sources floating through the Boat Basin as well. These pollutants pose substantial risks to marine life and the overall ecosystem integrity.

== Development ==
The original pond, founded in 1912 for sailing and motorboats, boasted four piers and spanned 8.4 hectares .

The surroundings of the basin have evolved from being primarily for boating visitors into a lively commercial and recreational hub, with many restaurants, cafes, and food stalls at Khayaban-e-Saadi. It's a popular dining spot for Karachiites, especially in the evenings and on weekends, owing to its vibrant atmosphere and diverse culinary offerings.
