= Boat Basin Park =

Park in Karachi, Pakistan

Coordinates: 24.8197°N 67.0214°E

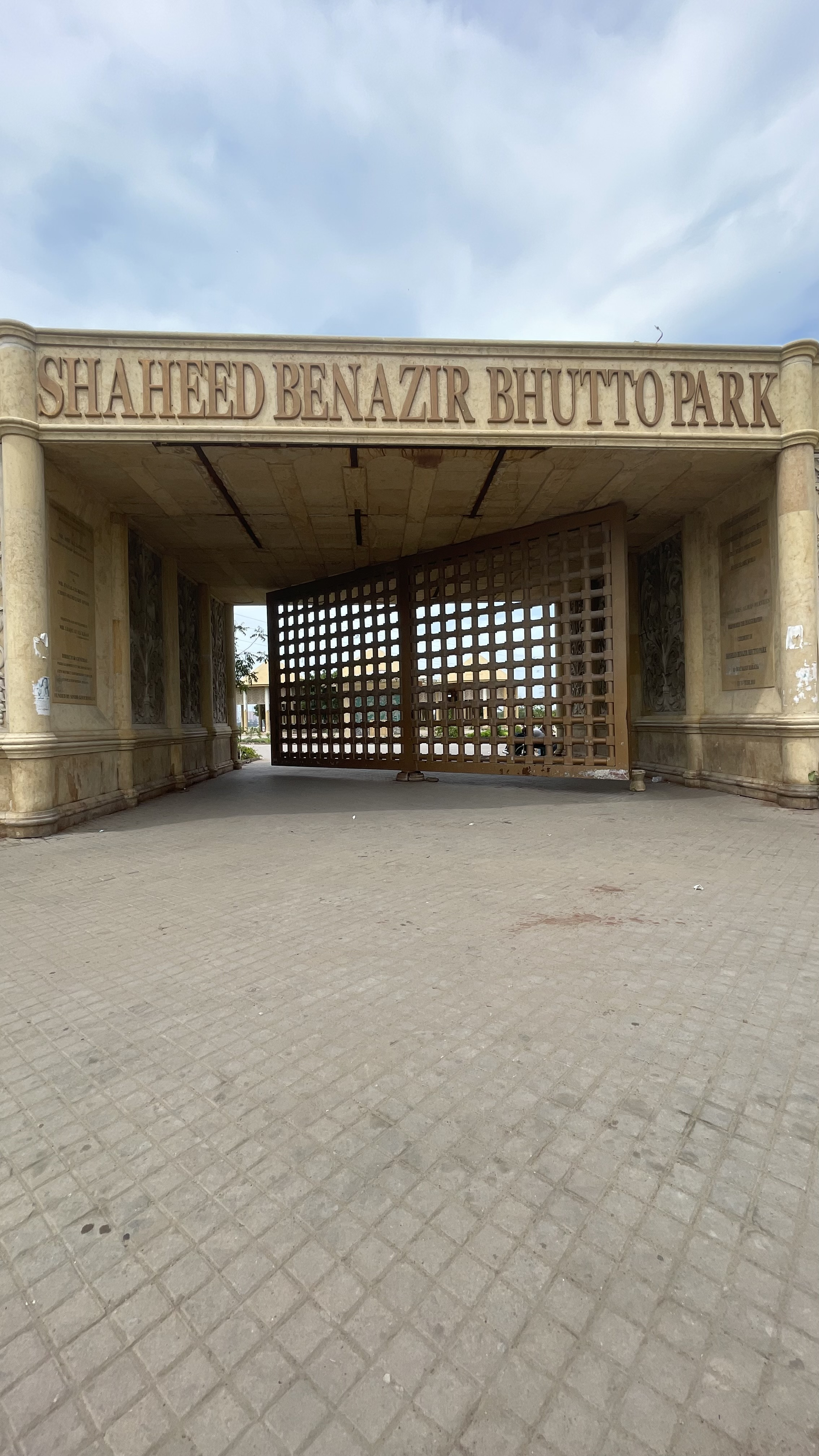
- The park at the Boat Basin was renamed in 2010 by President Zardari.
- Interactive map of Boat Basin Park
- Location: Clifton, Karachi, Block 6
- Area: 55 acres
- Created: 1960s

The Boat Basin Park, officially known as Shaheed Benazir Bhutto Park, is situated at Boat Basin, Clifton, Karachi. In the 1960s, the Karachi Development Authority built the 55-acre park. It was then owned by the Karachi Metropolitan Corporation and the Government of Karachi.

The COM3 Plaza high-rise was illegally built on land designated for parking at Shaheed Benazir Bhutto Park.

== See also ==
- List of parks and gardens in Pakistan
- List of parks and gardens in Lahore
- List of parks and gardens in Karachi
