= Sultan Iskandar =

Sultan Iskandar may refer to:

- Sultan Iskandar Shah, commonly identified with Parameswara (king), the 5th and last Raja of Singapura and the 1st ruler of the Malacca Sultanate
- Sultan Mahmud Iskandar Shah, 11th Sultan of Perak
- Sultan Iskandar Zulkarnain, 15th Sultan of Perak
- Sultan Ibrahim Iskandar ll, ruler of Maldives,
- 17th century Sultan Iskandar Muda (1583–1636), Acehnese ruler (r. 1607-36)
- Sultan Ali Iskandar Shah, or Sultan Ali of Johor (1824–1877), 19th Sultan of Johor
- Iskandar of Perak (1876–1938), 30th Sultan of Perak
- Iskandar of Johor (1932–2010), 8th Yang di-Pertuan Agong of Malaysia, the 24th Sultan of Johor

== See also ==
- Iskandar
