= Iskandar =

Iskandar or Eskandar or variations may refer to:

== Places ==
- Iskandar Malaysia, the new main southern development corridor in Johor, Malaysia
- Iskandar (town), Tashkent Region, Uzbekistan
- Iskandar Airport, a military airport in Pangkalan Bun, Central Kalimantan, Indonesia

=== Iran ===
- Eskandar, Iran, a village in Sistan and Baluchestan Province
- Eskandar, East Azerbaijan, a village in East Azerbaijan Province
- Eskandar, South Khorasan, a village in South Khorasan Province

== Other uses ==
- 9K720 Iskander, a Russian ballistic missile
- Iskandar (film), a 2003 film
- Iskandar (name), masculine given name and surname

== See also ==
- Alexander the Great
- Iskanderkul, an alpine lake located in the Fann Mountains of Tajikistan
- Iscandar, a fictional planet in Space Battleship Yamato a.k.a. Star Blazers
- List of Fate/Zero characters
- Sikandar (disambiguation)
- İskender (disambiguation)
- Eskandari (disambiguation)
