= Darvesh Goth =

Coordinates: 24°51′N 66°55′E

Darvesh Goth is a neighbourhood of Keamari Town in Karachi, Sindh, Pakistan.
