= Skender =

Name

Skender (Albanian: Skënder) (Bosnian: Skender) is a masculine first name, commonly found in Albania and Kosovo and among people of Bosniak ethnicity in present-day Bosnia and Herzegovina, Serbia and Montenegro. Skender is also used as a surname and there are a number of closely related family names found globally which are derived from Skender (such as Skeja, Skejić, Skejo, Skenderi, Skenderija, Skenderović, Skenderovski, Skendžić, Schender, Skander, Skinder, Skenner and Skanderson). Modern Skender Surname distribution

The historic origins of the surname Skender are unclear as the name appears to have originated independently in the several countries in which it is found. The reason for the name being found in so many different countries is that, as a word, the name Skender is a root word (Urwort) in the entire Indo-European family of languages. This is the group of languages spoken today in all countries ranging from India to Iceland. It is especially prevalent as root word in the Celtic and ancient Germanic (Urgermanische) languages – the most compelling evidence that the name is most probably of ancient Celtic origin.

The origin of the name Skender in the Balkan region is from the closely related Turkish name Iskender, Persian Iskandar and Arabic Al-Iskandar, which are all in turn derived from Alexander. It is then hypothesized that the Albanian Skender entered the language through contact and islamization of the region by the Ottoman Empire, while the Albanian language also retained its native corruption of Alexander in the form of Leka.

Johann Pokorny, in his 1898 Indo-Germanische Wörterbuch (Indo-Germanic Bronze Age Dictionary), is the source of this hypothesis. Pokorny gives two possible original meanings of the name, using the roots "skend" and "skand". On page 929 Pokorny lists the root "skend" as the separating of skin, scale or rind. "Sken-tr" is the act of cutting and "sken-to" is the part that has been cut off. In newer, but still very old Celtic one finds the word on 2,000-year-old Alpine rune stones as "ysgynthr" with the same meaning. In modern German, one finds the expansion of this root as schinnen, which comes from the same Celtic origin and means to skin one's enemy, plunder and mishandle him. Thus, Pokorny notes the word "skan-do", meaning "land laying in waste" (that is, plundered or "skinned") is the Celto-Germanic root of certain family names found in Baden, Switzerland.

Skender is also found in the old German and Saxon word Skander, which means Scandinavian or Viking raider. It may be the origin of the Gaelic word Skene and Skene-to, which is the traditional knife the Scots carry in their stockings, as well as the source of the Latvian name, Skenders, which is believed to have come to that land via the Teutonic Knights who would have had this ancient German word meaning "violent or scandalous behavior". The name is also found in Denmark in family names such as Skander, Skenner, Skinder and Skanderson. In Jutland, there is the town of Skanderborg and the former monastery at Skenderup. The name Skinder is found on street signs in the Danish cities of Helsingör and Copenhagen. Records from the town of Skanderborg, Denmark, for instance, record the name Skender and its variations as early as the year 1100. This first root seems to prevail in the northern European areas.

On page 526 of the same book, Pokorny notes the second root "skend-" as meaning "illuminated, glowing or bright," This root has more of a visual or "seeing" connotation. This root derivation is found in the middle and southern European lands originally inhabited by Celts. These lands included southern Germany, Austria and the Alpine regions of Slovenia and the Dinaric Alps along the Adriatic as far south as Albania and Macedonia. The Skender name is found historically in this form throughout this area.
