= Goth Shaikhan =

Neighbourhood of Karachi, Pakistan

Coordinates: 24°51′N 66°55′E

Goth Shaikhan is a neighbourhood of Keamari Town in the southern part of Karachi, Sindh, Pakistan.
