= Sikanderpur =

Sikanderpur may refer to these places in India:

- Sikanderpur, Kannauj in Kannauj district, Uttar Pradesh, India
- Sikanderpur, Mathura, a village in Mathura district, Uttar Pradesh, India
- Sikanderpur, Punjab, a village in Jalandhar, India
- Sikanderpur, Uttar Pradesh in Ballia district, Uttar Pradesh, India
  - Sikanderpur Assembly constituency
- Sikanderpur metro station, of the Delhi Metro in Gurgaon, India

== See also ==
- Sikandarpur (disambiguation)
- Sikandarabad (disambiguation)
- Sikander (disambiguation)
- Sikandar or Sikander
