= Jackson Market =

Second-hand products market in Karachi

Coordinates: 24.8237°N 66.9791°E

Jackson Market جیکسن بازار
- Marketplace
- Interactive map of Jackson Market
- Country: Pakistan
- Province: Sindh
- City: Karachi
- Founded: 1982

Jackson Market, also known as Jackson Bazaar, (Urdu: جیکسن بازار) is a flea market located in Keamari, Karachi. It is known as a marketplace of second-hand goods and is popular among lower-middle class of Karachi. It is also sometimes called black market because of smuggled goods sold there.

== History ==
It was founded around 1982 as a marketplace and used to sell second-hand appliances from ships only. The shops now also sell smuggled goods along with reconditioned equipment.

Previously, it was known as cheap-as-chips goods market.
