= Port Tower Complex =

- مجتمع برج بندر

General information
- Status: Proposed
- Type: Commercial & Mix Use
- Architectural style: Contemporary Modern
- Location: Karachi, Pakistan
- Cost: US$350,000,000
- Owner: Karachi Port Trust

Height
- Roof: 593 m (1,946 ft)

Technical details
- Floor count: 117

Design and construction
- Architect: Mott MacDonald
- Architecture firm: AEDAS (UK) & Mott MacDonald

The Port Tower Complex was a proposed skyscraper, with a planned height of 593 metres (1,946 ft), to be located in Karachi, Sindh, Pakistan.

The complex was planned to be located on 32 hectares (80 acres) of land reclaimed from wetlands by the Karachi Port Trust, alongside the Mai Kolachi Bypass.Since, no progress has been built to this very day.

== See also ==
- List of tallest buildings in Karachi
- List of tallest buildings in the world
- List of tallest buildings in Pakistan
- KPT Officers Society
