= Goth Mohammad Ali =

Coordinates: 24.883°N 66.832°E

Goth Mohammad Ali is a neighbourhood of Keamari Town in the southern part of Karachi, Sindh, Pakistan.
