= Nehr-e-Khayyam =

Water channel in Karachi

- Nehr-i-Khayyam
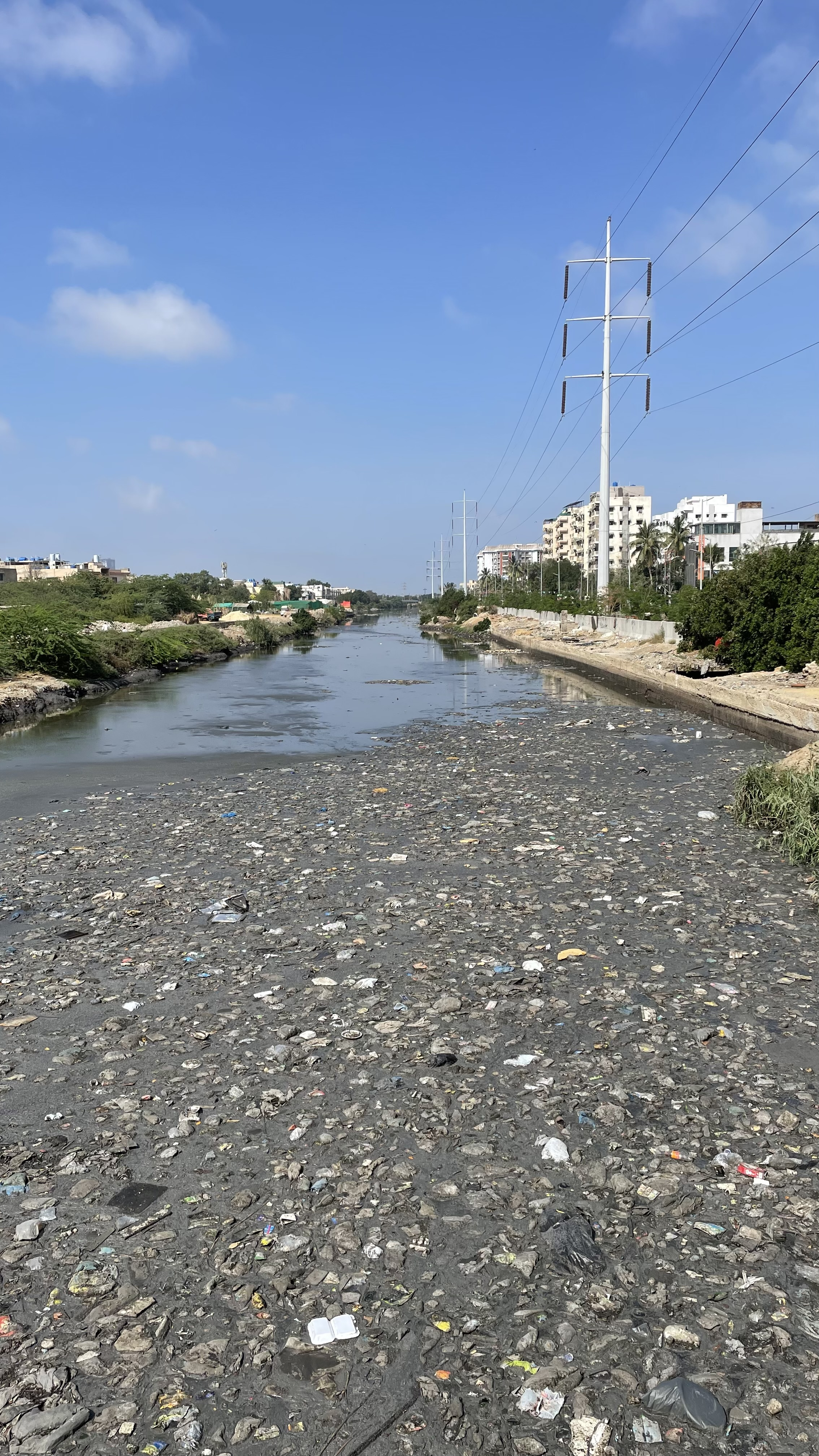
- View along the channel from east to west.
- Interactive map of Nehr-e-Khayyam
- Location: Clifton, Karachi
- Coordinates: 24.82502°N 67.02993°E
- Type: Channel (Stormwater Drain)
- Primary inflows: Raw municipal waste water
- Primary outflows: Boat Basin
- Basin countries: Pakistan
- Max. length: 2.5 kilometres (1.6 mi)
- Average depth: 3 metres (9.8 ft)
- Surface elevation: 0 m (0 ft)

Nehr-e-Khayyam (Urdu: نہر خیام), situated in Clifton, Karachi, Pakistan, is a water channel originally constructed as a storm drain.

== Features and location ==
Roughly 10-feet-deep, the channel is approximately two and a half kilometer in length, half exposed to the open air while the other half is covered, overbuilt by road and buildings. Stretching from Bank Road at Khayaban-e-Iqbal to Khyaban-e-Saadi, the channel is linked with the sea, connecting through Boat Basin. The water flow of Nehr-e-Khayyam is bidirectional: during low tide, water moves from the land to the sea, while during high tide, it reverses course, flowing from the sea back to the land.

== Development ==
Despite its original purpose of draining rainwater into the sea, and first plans as a 'recreational zone' in the 1970s, Nehr-e-Khayyam has, over the decades, become a focal point of urban interest for environmental reasons. The channel is plagued by heavy pollution, filled with garbage and sewage, a stark contrast to its location in the densely populated and upscale neighbourhood of Clifton. Numerous efforts have been made to address the pollution and enhance the aesthetic appeal of the area. However, these endeavors have been marred by challenges such as broken contracts, unclear responsibilities, and financial discrepancies, resulting in unresolved legal disputes awaiting adjudication in courts. Beyond issues of pollution and degraded water quality, scientific studies have highlighted the pervasive presence of bacteria within the channel, all of which eventually flow through the Chinna Creek into the Arabian Sea.

== See also ==
- History of water supply and sanitation
- Sanitation
