= Mojokerto =

City in East Java, Indonesia

- City
- City of Mojokerto; Kota Mojokerto

Regional transcription(s)
  - Javanese: Kuthå Måjåkěrtå (Gêdrig) كوڟا ماجاكۤرتا (Pégon) ꦏꦸꦛꦩꦗꦏꦼꦂꦠ (Hånåcåråkå)
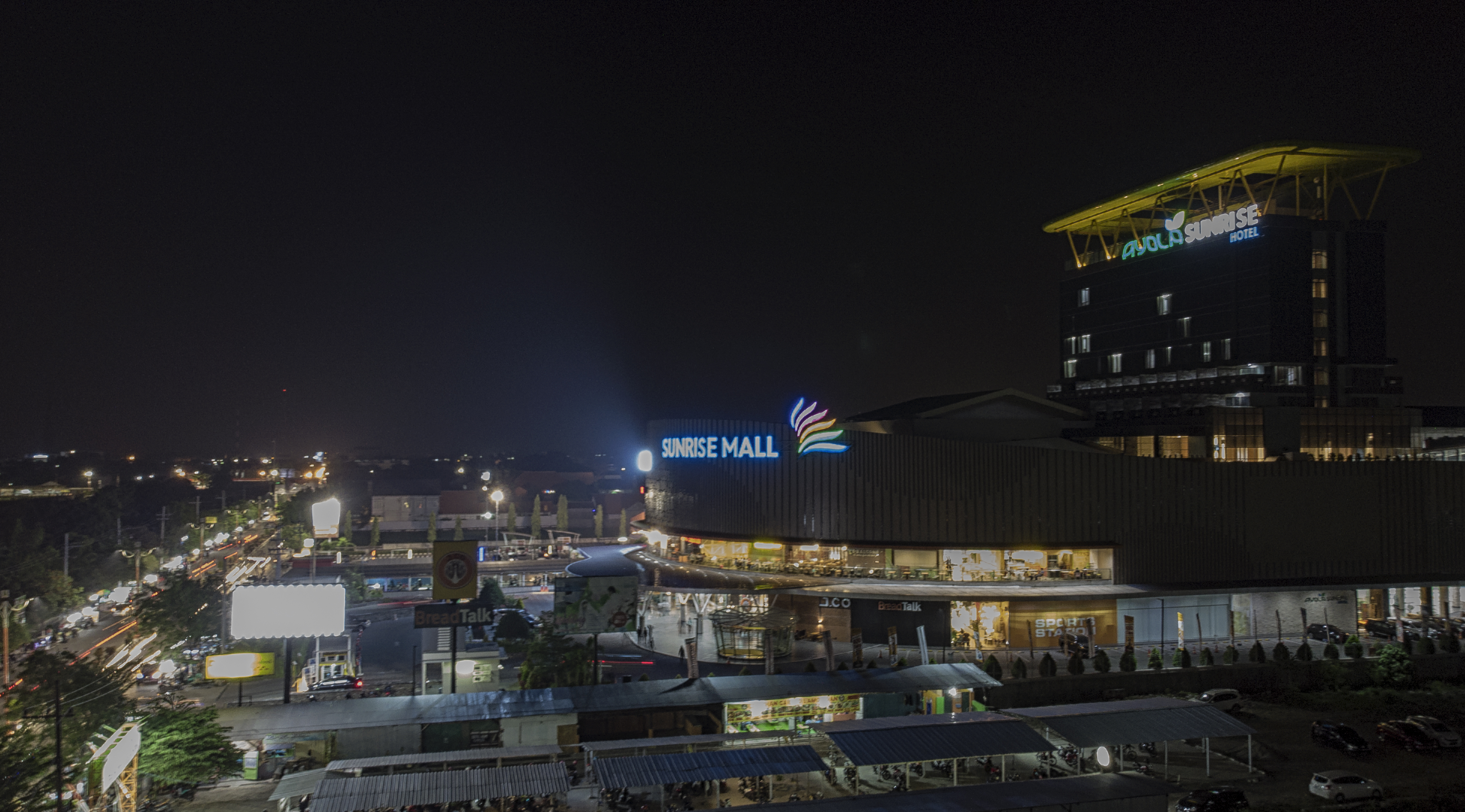
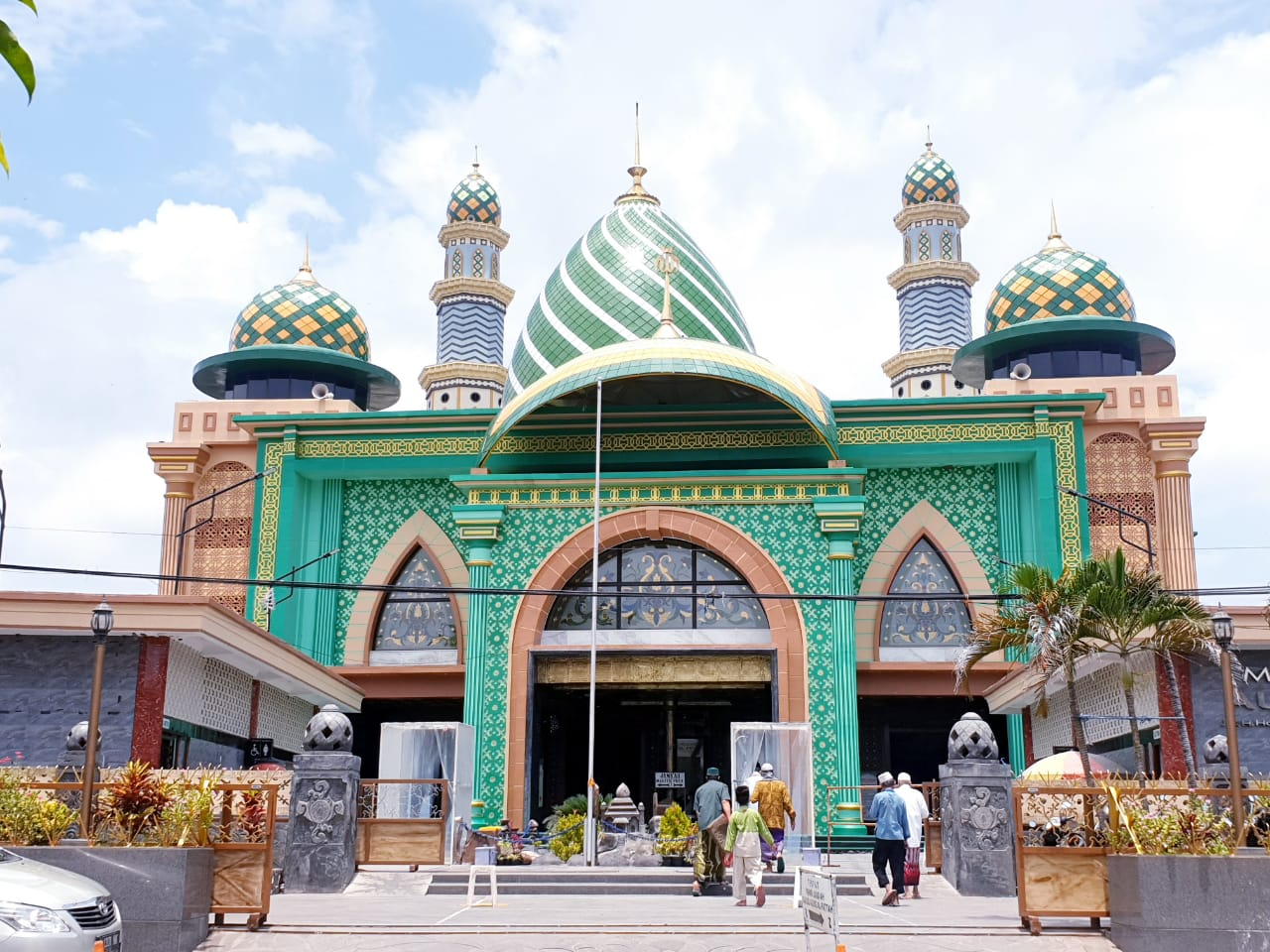
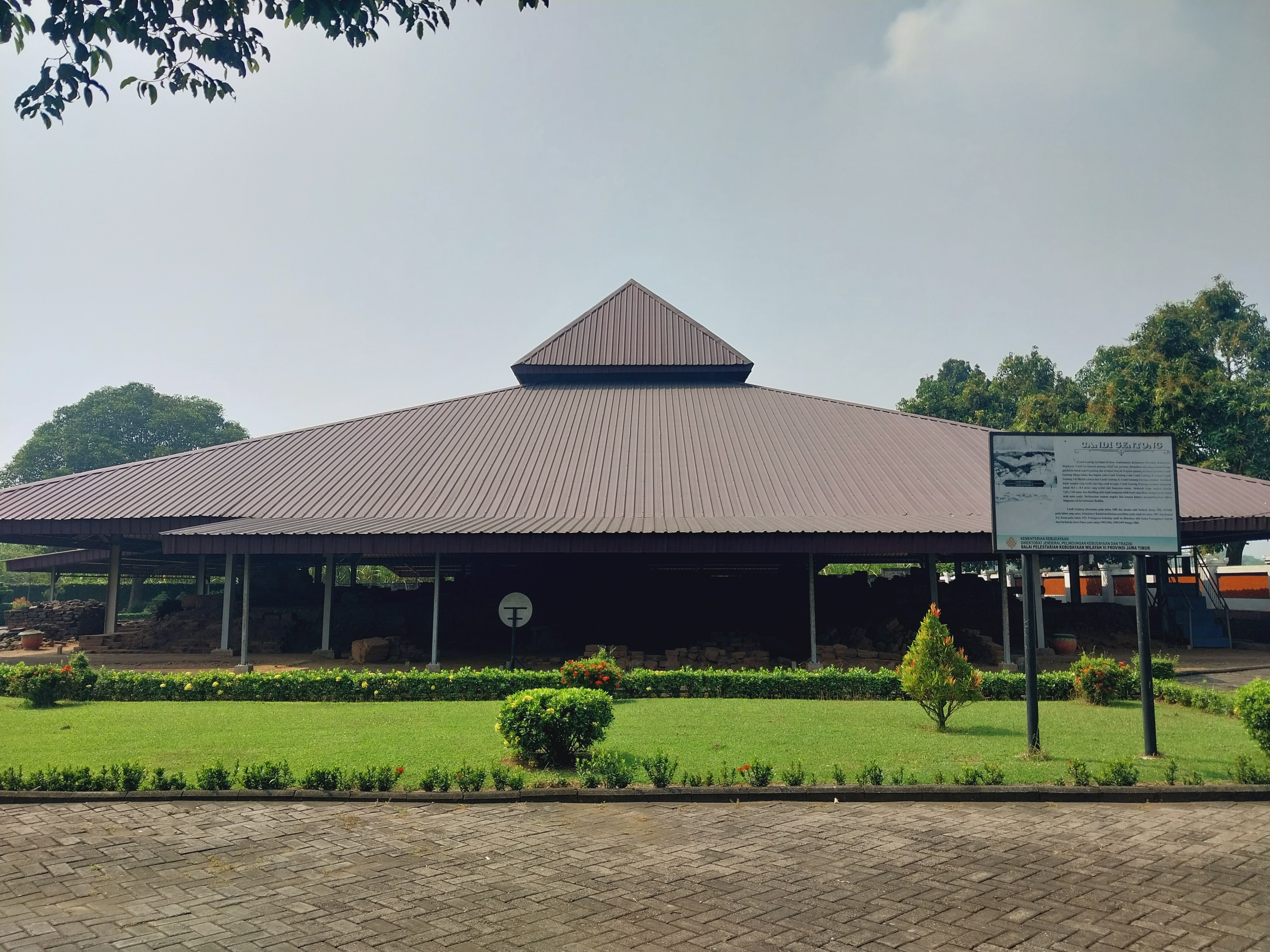
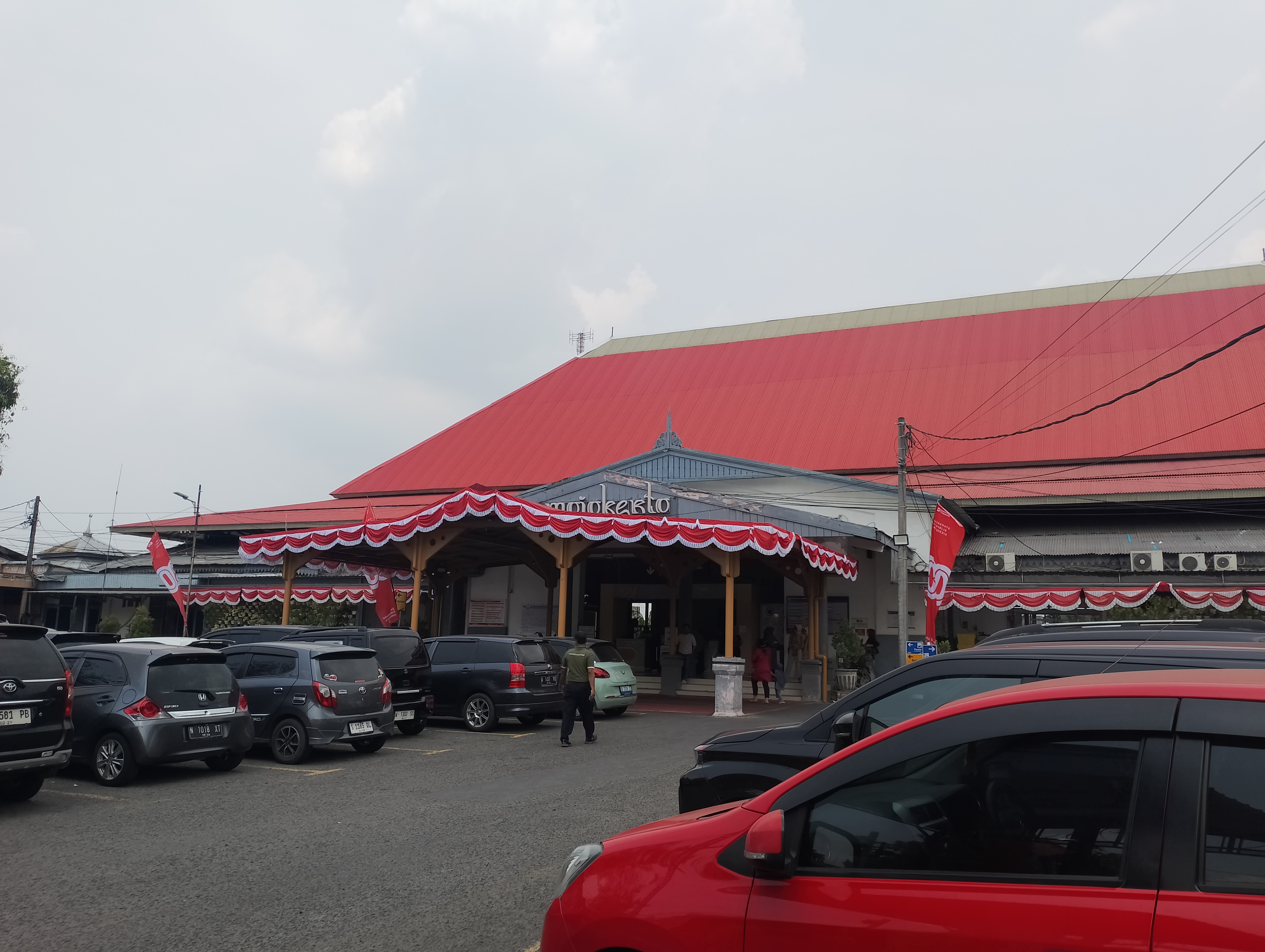
- Sunrise Mall at night, Al-Fattah Great Mosque, Candi Gentong, Mojokerto station

- Coat of arms
- Nicknames: Kota Onde-onde (Sesame Balls City); Mexico van Java (Dutch) (Mexico of Java)
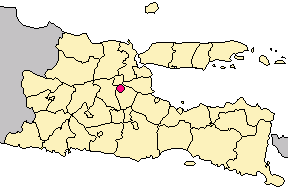
- Location within East Java

- Location in Java and Indonesia Mojokerto (Indonesia)
- Coordinates: 7°28′20″S 112°26′1″E
- Country: Indonesia
- Province: East Java
- Metropolitan area: Gerbangkertosusila
- Founded: 1293
- Gemeente: 1918
- Kota: 1950
- Founder: Raden Wijaya

Government
  - Mayor: Ika Puspitasari
  - Vice Mayor: Rachman Sidharta Arisandi

Area
  - Total: 20.21 km^{2} (7.80 sq mi)
  - Rank: 95

Population (mid 2024 estimate)
  - Total: 142,272
  - Rank: 20
  - Density: 7,040/km^{2} (18,230/sq mi)
- Time zone: UTC+7 (IWST)
- Area code: (+62) 321
- HDI (2024): ▲0.809 (2024); Very High
- Website: mojokertokota.go.id

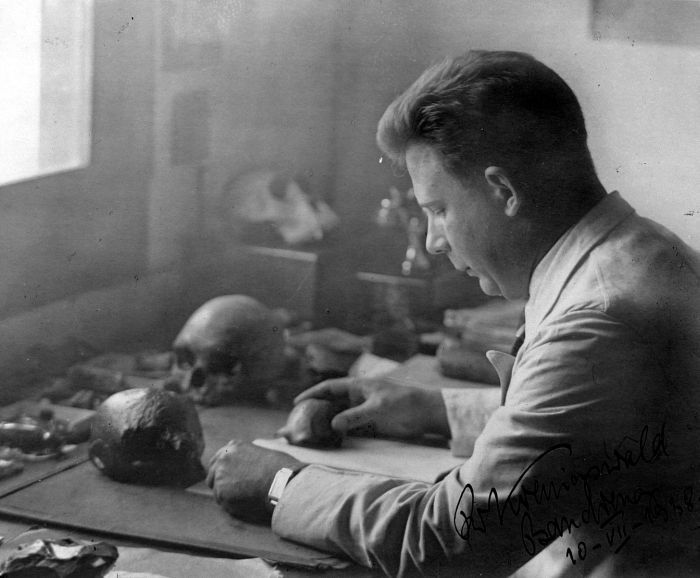
G.H.R. von Koenigswald (1902–1982), whose team discovered the Mojokerto child

Mojokerto (Javanese: ꦩꦗꦏꦼꦂꦠ (Måjåkěrtå)) is a city in East Java Province of Indonesia. It is located 40 km southwest of Surabaya, the provincial capital, and constitutes one of the component units of the Surabaya metropolitan area (known as Gerbangkertosusila) which comprises Gresik Regency, Bangkalan Regency, Mojokerto Regency, Mojokerto City, Surabaya City, Sidoarjo Regency, and Lamongan Regency. The city covers an area of 20.21 km^{2}, and had a population of 120,196 at the 2010 census and 132,434 at the 2020 Census; the official estimate as of mid-2024 was 142,272 (comprising 70,647 males and 71,625 females).

== Administrative districts ==
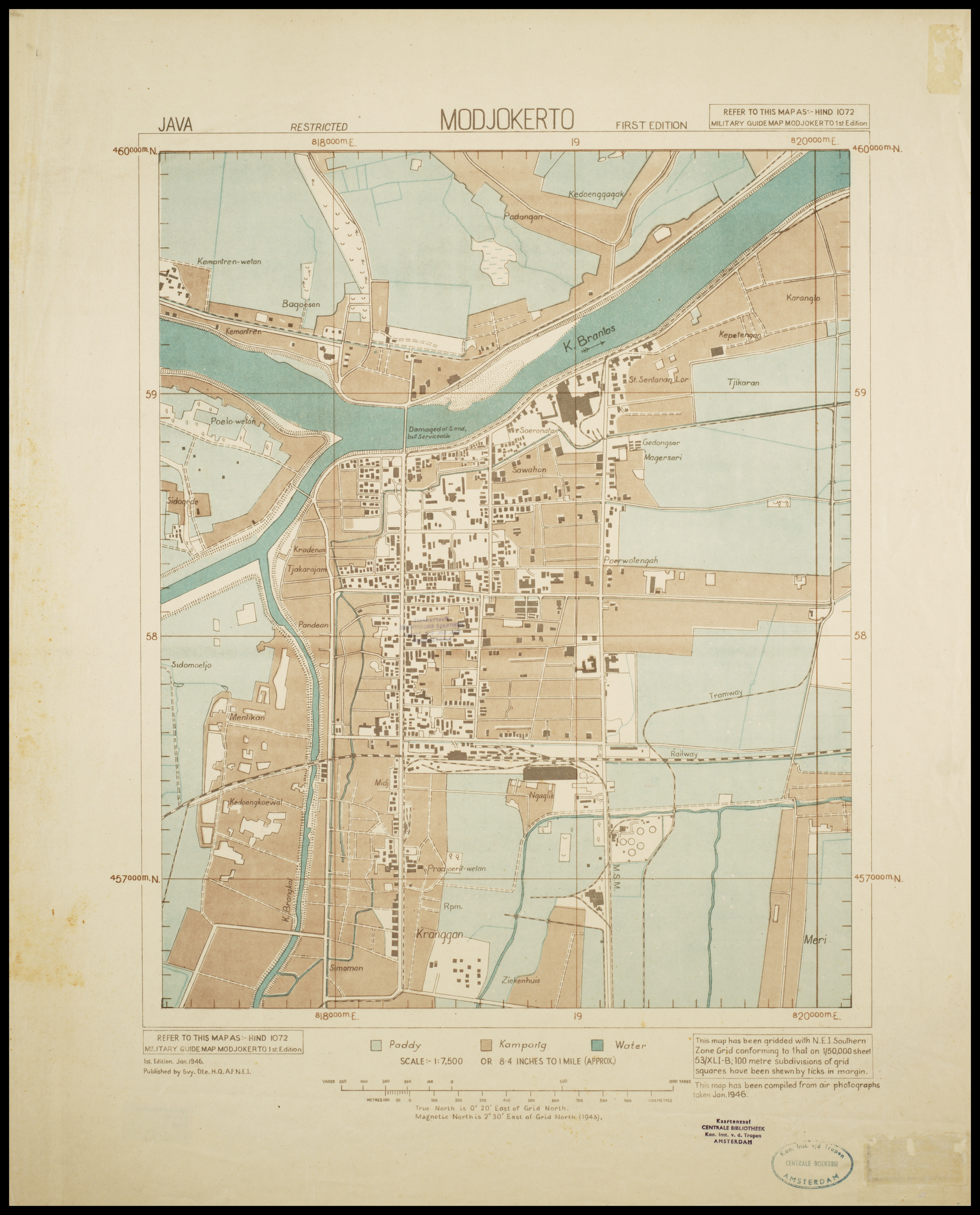
1946 Mojokerto City Map

The city of Mojokerto is administratively divided into three districts (kecamatan), tabulated below with their areas and their populations at 2010 and 2020 Censuses, together with the official estimates as of mid-2024. The table also includes the numbers of administrative villages (urban kelurahan) in each district, with their names and postcodes

Kode Wilayah	Name of District (kecamatan)	Area in km^{2}	Pop'n Census 2010	Pop'n Census 2020	Pop'n estimate mid 2024	No. of villages	Names of urban villages - kelurahan (with post codes)
35.76.01	Prajurit Kulon	7.28	53,183	40,693	43,502	6	Mentikan (61323), Kauman (61324), Pulorejo (61325), Prajurit Kulon (61326), Blooto (61327), Surodinawan (61328)
35.76.02	Magersari	8.27	67,013	56,588	60,588	6	Balongsari (61314), Gunung Gedangan (61315), Kedundung (61316), Wates (61317), Magersari (61318), Gedongan (61319)
35.76.03	Kranggan	4.65	^{(a)}	35,153	38,132	6	Purwotengah (61311), Sentanan (61312), Jagalan (61313), Meri (61315), Kranggan (61321), Miji (61322)
	Totals	20.21	120,196	132,434	142,272	18	

Note: (a) Kranggan District created since 2010 from parts of the other two districts; its population in 2010 is included with that of the districts from which it was formed.

The 2022 populations of the 18 urban "villages" (kelurahan) are listed below:

- Kecamatan Prajurit Kulon
  - Surodinawan (9,255)
  - Prajurit Kulon (8,178)
  - Blooto (7,123)
  - Mentikan (6,310)
  - Kauman (3,092)
  - Pulorejo (8,550)
- Kecamatan Magersari
  - Gunung Gedangan (7,903)
  - Kedundung (15,959)
  - Balongsari (7,930)
  - Gedongan (2,225)
  - Magersari (5,656)
  - Wates (20,355)
- Kecamatan Kranggan
  - Kranggan (13,348)
  - Meri (9,213)
  - Jagalan (2,941)
  - Miji (8,603)
  - Sentanan (2,237)
  - Purwotengah (1,564)

== Economy ==
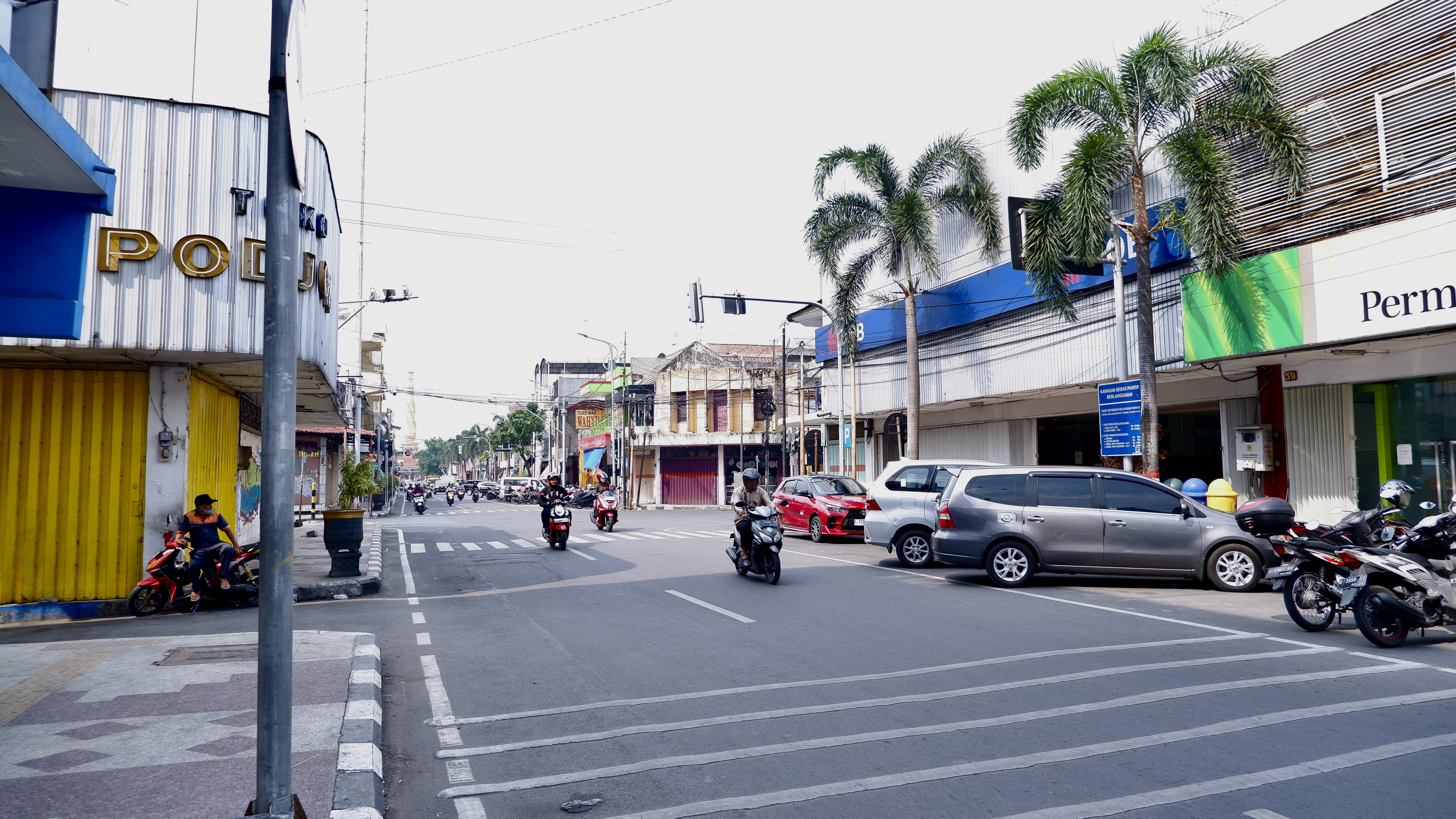
Mojopahit street, Mojokerto

Mojokerto occupies a strategic position and role in East Java. It functions as a reliable sustaining stock of foodstuff and tourist attractions. Historically, Mojokerto is widely known as the then center of Wetan Mas Kingdom of King Airlangga (1029/1041), and of the Majapahit Kingdom with its Rajasa dynasty (1292–1400) and its territories exceeding Nusantara (standardized concept of Indonesian archipelagic territories).

Mojokerto has a motto of "Kota Budi Parinda"

== Etymology ==
The name "Mojokerto" is a local Javanese pronunciation of the Javanese words "Maja" and "Karta". The word Maja is the same as that of Majapahit and originates from the word 'bael fruit' that was found at the location of the new capital of the Majapahit Empire. Karta and Kerta mean 'Masterpiece', therefore Mojokerto means 'Masterpiece of Majapahit'.

== Culinary ==
Mojokerto is widely known as "Kota Onde-onde" (The city of sesame balls).

== The Seven Age Anniversary Plan of Majapahit Glory ==
Since four years ago, there have been several cultural fairs in East Java, lasting for a week. Some 37 districts participated. These activities have been held in alternate towns and cities such as Surabaya, Malang, Jember, and Madiun. The activities were aimed at utilizing East Java's specific potentials either in the form of traditional arts or special foods in the framework of marketing tourist attractions of East Java. This year coinciding with the year of the Green Environment, of Tourist Visit, and of Seven-Age commemoration stipulated Mojokerto as the site for holding the cultural fair. For this purpose local and provincial committees are and have been taking the following measures:

- To hold a symposium on the verge of the seven-age anniversary of Majapahit and to carry any book-writing concerning Majapahit
- To designate the year of Green Environment by planting rare plants in the area Majapahit remains; thirty-seven Kabupaten in East Java Province will participate on this occasion.
- To innovate Majapahit's artifacts (archaeological remains)
- To establish facilities at tourist attractions

Various activities being arranged are as follows:

- East Java's cultural and tourist fair reflecting the glory of Majapahit
- Archaeological Exhibition
- Seminars of archaeologists and historians
- Cultural arts and festivals
- Introduction to tourist attractions

The above-mentioned events took place from July 5 to July 15, 1993. Some foreign tourists came from China, Finland, Denmark, Malaysia and the Middle East.

== Climate ==
Mojokerto has a tropical savanna climate (Köppen Aw) with moderate to little rainfall from May to November and heavy to very heavy rainfall from December to April.

Climate data for Mojokerto
Month	Jan	Feb	Mar	Apr	May	Jun	Jul	Aug	Sep	Oct	Nov	Dec	Year
Mean daily maximum °C (°F)	30.4 (86.7)	30.4 (86.7)	30.7 (87.3)	31.1 (88.0)	31.3 (88.3)	31.2 (88.2)	31.1 (88.0)	31.8 (89.2)	32.4 (90.3)	32.8 (91.0)	32.3 (90.1)	31.1 (88.0)	31.4 (88.5)
Daily mean °C (°F)	26.5 (79.7)	26.4 (79.5)	26.6 (79.9)	26.7 (80.1)	26.6 (79.9)	26.1 (79.0)	25.7 (78.3)	26.2 (79.2)	26.8 (80.2)	27.4 (81.3)	27.4 (81.3)	26.8 (80.2)	26.6 (79.9)
Mean daily minimum °C (°F)	22.6 (72.7)	22.5 (72.5)	22.5 (72.5)	22.4 (72.3)	22.0 (71.6)	21.1 (70.0)	20.4 (68.7)	20.6 (69.1)	21.2 (70.2)	22.1 (71.8)	22.5 (72.5)	22.5 (72.5)	21.9 (71.4)
Average rainfall mm (inches)	327 (12.9)	339 (13.3)	314 (12.4)	164 (6.5)	108 (4.3)	39 (1.5)	31 (1.2)	11 (0.4)	5 (0.2)	47 (1.9)	125 (4.9)	273 (10.7)	1,783 (70.2)
Source: Climate-Data.org

== Notable people ==
- Anang Iskandar (born 1958), former senior ranking officer of the Indonesian National Police (POLRI)
