= Sikandar =

Sikandar (sometimes Sikander) is Persian variant of Alexander, which is Ancient Greek for "defender" or "warrior" (literally "the man who repels [enemies]"). When Alexander of Macedonia conquered Persia, the Persians called him Sikandar lidi, a variant of Iskandar.

== People ==
=== Rulers ===
- Alexander the Great (BC 356–323), also known as Sikandar-i-Azam
- Alauddin Khalji (1266–1316), Sultan of Delhi, who minted coins using the title Sikandar-e-Sani (The Second Alexander)
- Sikandar Khan Ghazi (14th century), Vizier of Sylhet
- Abul Mujahid Sikandar Shah (died 1390), Sultan of Bengal
- Sikandar Shah Miri Butshikan (1353–1413), Sultan of Kashmir
- Sikandar Shah, Sultan of Bengal (1358–1390)
- Nuruddin Sikandar Shah (15th century), Sultan of Bengal
- Sikandar Khan Lodi (1458–1517), Sultan of Delhi
- Sikandar Shah of Gujarat, ruler of Gujarat Sultanate (died 1526)
- Sikandar Shah Suri (died 1559), Sultan of Delhi
- Sikander Jah, Asaf Jah III (1768–1829), Nizam of Hyderabad

=== Other people ===
- Sikandar Hayat Khan (1892–1942), politician in British India
- Sikandar Abu Zafar (1918–1975), Bangladeshi journalist and poet
- Sikander Bakht (1918–2004), Indian politician
- Sikander Bakht (born 1957), Pakistani cricketer
- Sikandar Kher (born 1982), Indian actor
- Sikandar Sultan, Pakistani businessman
- Sikandar Raza (born 1986), Pakistani-Zimbabwean cricketer
- James Skinner (East India Company officer) (1778–1841), also known as Sikandar, Anglo-Indian officer of the East India Company

== Places ==
- Secunderabad, a city in Telangana, India, named after Sikandar Jah
- Sekandar, Markazi, a village in Markazi Province, Iran
- Sikandar, Iran, a village in Sistan and Baluchestan Province, Iran
- Sikandar Bagh, a fortified villa and garden in Lucknow, India, a sepoy stronghold during the Indian Mutiny

== Media ==
- Sikandar (1941 film), an Indian film by Sohrab Modi about Alexander the Great
- Sikandar (2009 film), an Indian Hindi-language film directed by Piyush Jha
- Sikander, a 2013 Indian Punjabi-language film
  - Sikander 2, its sequel film by Manav Shah
- Sikandar (2025 film), an Indian Hindi-language film directed by AR Murugadoss
- Sikandar, a fictional villain in the 2001 Indian film Farz, portrayed by Mukesh Tiwari

== See also ==
- Iskandar (disambiguation)
- İskender (disambiguation)
- Sikandarabad (disambiguation)
- Sikanderpur (disambiguation)
- Sikandarpur (disambiguation)
