= Masroor Colony =

Coordinates: 24°51′N 66°55′E

Masroor Colony is a neighbourhood of Keamari Town in the southern part of Karachi, Sindh, Pakistan.
