= Anang Iskandar =

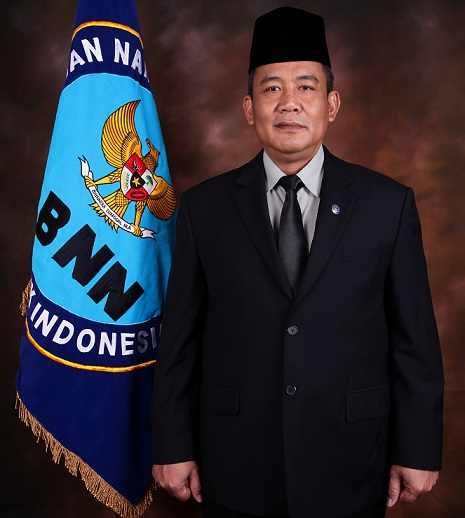
Anang Iskandar as Director of the National Anti-Narcotics Agency (BNN)

Commissioner General Dr. Anang Iskandar, S.H., M.H. (born 18 May 1958 in Mojokerto, East Java) is a former senior ranking officer of the Indonesian National Police (POLRI). Prior to his retirement, Iskandar was the head of the POLRI's Criminal Investigation Department (Bareskrim).

Iskkandar was previously Director of the National Anti-Narcotics Agency (BNN), replacing Commissioner General Gories Mere, who retired in December 2012.

== Life ==
Iskandar was born in Mojokerto, East Java, on 18 May 1958, to Suyitno Kamari Jaya, a Barber, and Raunah, a homemaker. Iskandar is Javanese.

Iskandar wrote that his father taught him barbering since he was in grade school, which developed into both a hobby and part-time job. Iskandar attended Taruna Nusa Harapan (TNH) high school in Mojokerto, where he also worked part-time as a barber near the campus and serviced customers who were mostly students of the school.

Iskandar also wrote of his early fondness for photography and painting which he learned through extra-curricular programs at school and which he still cites as his hobbies.

Following high school graduation, Iskandar applied to college with the intent of majoring in agriculture and eventually becoming a county official. He also applied to the Indonesian Armed Forces Academy (AKABRI). AKABRI offered Iskandar admission (ranking him 43 out of 203 applicants offered admission), which he accepted.

== Career ==
In 1982, Iskandar graduated from AKABRI and in the same year received his officer commission from POLRI.

Iskandar's first post was Bali, where he held several positions, including police chief for South Denpasar, Kuta, and Sanur sectors, and Chief of Port Enforcement and Security (P3) at Ngurah Rai International Airport.

Following his Bali tour, Iskandar attended the POLRI Institute for Higher Learning (PTIK) in Jakarta, after which he was assigned for several years to posts in the Jakarta and Tangerang district, which included: Unit Chief of Investigation at Tangerang Police Resort; Chief of Police, Pancoran District; Unit Chief, Vice Control, Taman Sari District; and Junior Division Head of Career Planning, Staff Personnel Office of the Indonesian Armed Forces (ABRI) at its headquarters in Cilangkap, West Java.

In 1997, Iskandar was sent to Indonesian National Police Staff & Leadership Training Academy (SESPIM), after which he was assigned as Directorate Secretary of Community Relations & Planning in Bengkulu. He was then assigned back to his former position at ABRI headquarters.

Iskandar was then given the command posts as Police Chief of Blitar and Kediri in East Java. He was then assigned as Director of POLRI Training Academy, Bangsal—near his hometown of Mojokerto, then promoted to Director of Jakarta Metropolitan Police's (Polda Metro Jaya) Training Academy in Lido, West Java.

In January 2006, Iskandar was assigned as Surabaya Police Chief, which he held for two and a half years. Following this, he was assigned to BNN as Executive Director of Prevention, and subsequently, Director of Advocacy, Deputy of Prevention, BNN, where he was promoted to the rank of Brigadier General

On 28 October 2011, Iskandar was appointed Jambi Chief of Police, which he held for eight months. On 2 July 2012, he was assigned as POLRI Director of Human Resources at its Jakarta Headquarters, then was appointed two months later as Commandant of the Indonesian National Police Academy (AKPOL).

On 11 December 2012, POLRI Chief Timur Pradopo officially appointed Iskandar as Director of BNN, which promoted him to the rank of Commissioner-General—the equivalent of a three-star Lieutenant General.

On 7 September 2015, POLRI reassigned Iskandar as Director of BARESKRIM, POLRI's Criminal Investigation Department (CID). until his retirement on 5 March 2016.

== Police Training & Education ==
- Indonesian Armed Forces Training Academy (AKABRI), 1982.
- Specialist Training Criminal Research & Investigation (DIKJURPA), 1983
- Indonesian National Police Institute for Higher Learning (PTIK), 1987
- Narcotics Investigation Training, 1989
- Out Bound Leadership Training, 1993
- Indonesian National Police Staff & Leadership Training Academy (SESPIM), 1997
- Handgun Marksmanship Training, 1997
- Indonesian National Police Police Resort Chief Training Program (SUSJAB), 1999
- Criminal Investigation Training, 1999
- Management Course, 2000
- Indonesian National Police Senior Official Training Academy (SESPATI), 2005
- ESQ Leadership Training, 2010
- Intensive English Language Training, 32 Elementary Modules, 33 Intermediate Modules

== Academic Education ==
- State Elementary School (SD Negeri) No. 6, Mojokerto
- State Junior High School (SMP Negeri) No. 2, Mojokerto
- Senior High School (SMA) Taruna Nusa Harapan (TNH), Mojokerto
- Bachelor of Law (S1), Pancasila University, Jakarta
- Master of Law (S2), 17 August University, Semarang
- Doctor of Law (S3), Trisakti University, Jakarta

== Career & Assignments ==
- Deputy Chief of Police, Denpasar Sector, Bali
- Chief of Police, South-Denpasar Sector, Bali
- Chief of Police, Kuta Sector, Bali
- Chief, KP3, Ngurah Rai International Airport, Bali
- Student, National Police Institute for Higher Learning (PTIK)
- Unit Chief, Criminal Research, Tangerang, Jakarta Metropolitan Police (POLDA METRO JAYA)
- Chief of Police, Pancoran Sector, South-Jakarta
- Unit Chief, Criminal Research, Criminal Investigation Division (CID), Jakarta Metropolitan Police (POLDA METRO JAYA)
- Chief of Police, Taman Sari Sector, West-Jakarta
- Junior Division Chief, Junior Division Head of Career Planning, Staff Directorate, Indonesian Armed Forces (ABRI)
- Student, Indonesian National Police Staff & Leadership Training Academy
- Secretarial Director, Community Development & Planning (BIMAS), Bengkulu Regional Command
- Aide, Personnel Management, Indonesian Armed Forces (ABRI)
- Chief of Police, Blitar, East-Java Regional Command
- Chief of Police, Kediri, East-Java Regional Command
- Principal, Police Government School, Mojokerto, East-Java.
- Principal, Police Government School, Lido, Jakarta Metropolitan Sector.
- Chief of Police, East-Jakarta
- Indonesian National Police Senior Official Training Academy (SESPATI), Generation IX
- Chief of Police, Surabaya, East-Java Regional Command
- Director of Operations, Narcotics Prevention Division, National Narcotics Board (BNN)
- Director of Advocacy, Deputy Narcotics Prevention Division, National Narcotics Board (BNN)
- Chief of Police, Jambi
- Chief of Human Resources Division, Indonesian National Police (POLRI)
- Governor, Indonesian National Police Training Academy
- Director, National Narcotics Board (BNN)
- Director, Badan Reserse Kriminal (BARESKRIM)
