= Keamari, Karachi =

Locality in Karachi, Sindh, Pakistan

Kemari
- Locality
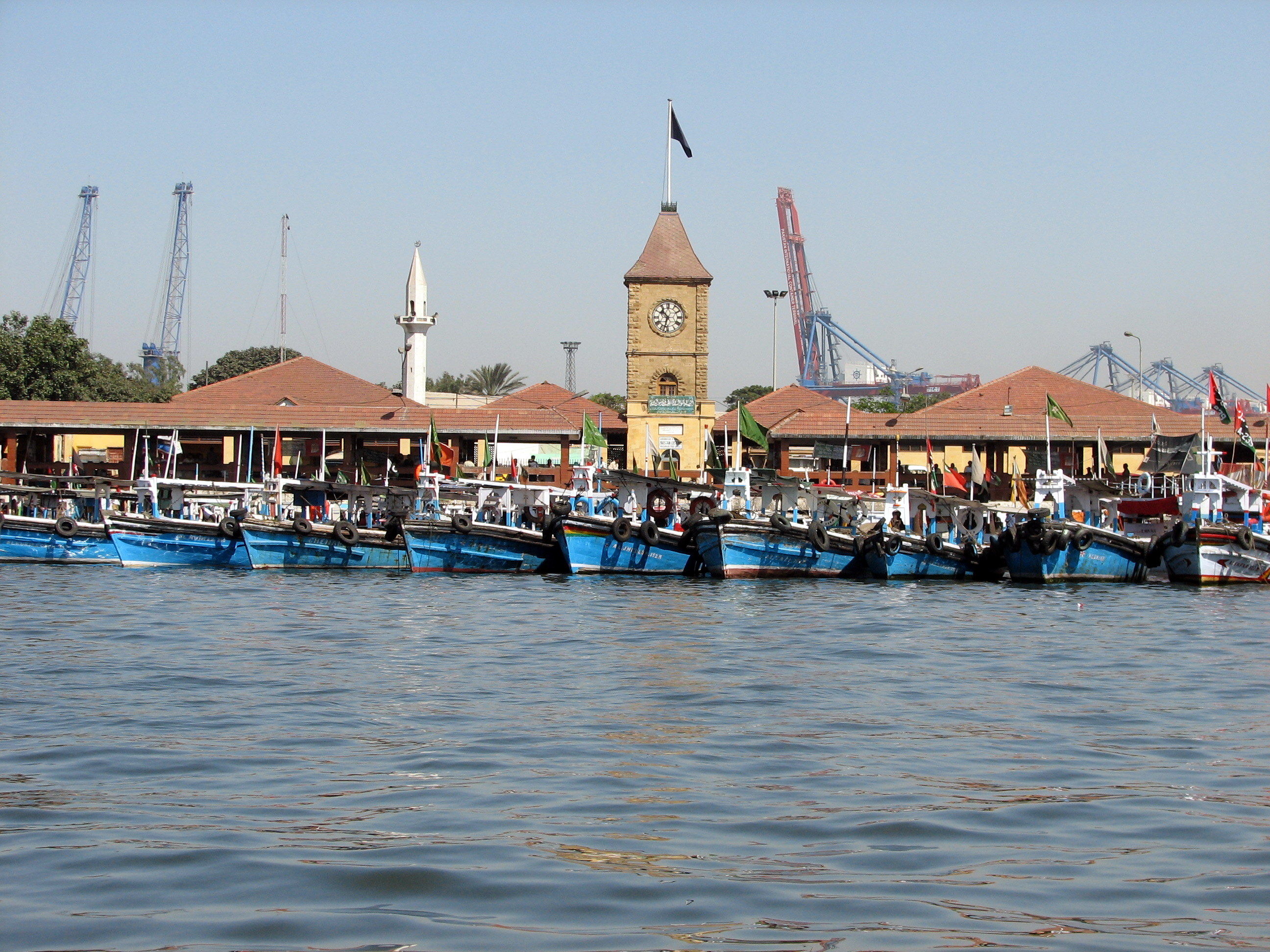
- Sydenham Passenger Pavilion at the Keamari Boat Basin was inaugurated in 1914
- Nickname: Seaway of Karachi
- Location within Sindh Location within Pakistan
- Coordinates: 24°49′N 66°59′E
- Country: Pakistan

Government
  - Constituency: NA-248 (Karachi West-I)
  - National Assembly Member: Abdul Qadir Patel (PPP)

Keamari (Sindhi: ڪياماڙي, Urdu: کیماڑی) is a neighbourhood in Karachi, Sindh, Pakistan. Keamari was originally an independent settlement built on a sandy ridge on the eastern side of Karachi Harbour. Keamari Town was formed in 2001 as part of the Local Government Ordinance 2001, and was subdivided into 11 union councils. The town system was disbanded in 2011, and Keamari Town was re-organized as part of Karachi West District in 2015.

In 2020, Keamari District was carved out of Karachi West District. So Kemari Town ended up being part of Kemari District.

== Location ==
Kemari Town comprised the western parts of Karachi, including the Port of Karachi and an extensive coastline of sandy beaches, small islands and mangrove forests. It does not include the southern island of Manora, which is administered by the Pakistani military as Manora Cantonment, because of the naval base located there. The town formed a large triangle with defined boundaries: the RCD Highway and the Lyari River form the northeastern border, the Hub River to the northwestern border, and the Arabian Sea formed the southern border.

== History ==
Kemari was a low lying island located between Manora and the city of Karachi well into the colonial era. During this time, Keamari was the landing point for all goods and people entering Karachi. Kemari's anchorage during the early colonial era was too shallow for large ships, and so those were instead forced to dock at Manora.

The 3-mile-long Napier Mole Road was built in 1854 as a raised embankment which connected Karachi with Keamari. A year earlier in 1853, the Napier obelisk was built to commemorate the late Governor of Sindh, Charles Napier. The British further built a spur of the Sindh Railway to Kemari, which did not follow Napier Mole, but instead along the east part of Chinna Creek. During the colonial era, Kemari had a naval yard, a government commissariat, post office, customs and railway houses. In 1865, the 379-metre-long iron Napier Mole Bridge was built as part of an upgrade. In 1914, the Sydenham Passenger Pavilion at Kemari's Boat Basin was inaugurated by Lord Willingdon. In 1917, the imposing Mules Mansion, designed by Iraqi-Jewish architect Moses Somake, was completed.

== Neighbourhoods ==
Most of the neighbourhoods of the defunct Kemari Town are densely populated with two exceptions. Baba Bhit is composed of three small islands in Karachi harbour that are home to about 5% of the town's population. Further west, Gabo Pat is mostly rural with about 10% of the town population but half of the total town area. There are small villages in the rural area of Kiamari, including:

- Abdul Rehman Goth
- Arbian
- Baba Bhit
- Bhutta Village
- Darvesh Goth
- Gabo Pat
- Goth Faqir Mohammad
- Goth Ghulam Mohammad
- Goth Haji Behram
- Goth Haji Jumma Khan
- Goth Haji Salar
- Goth Lashkari
- Goth Mauladad
- Goth Mohammad Ali
- Goth Shaikhan
- Gulshan-e-Sikandarabad
- Haji Ali Goth
- Jackson Bazar
- Jamali Goth
- Kakapir
- Kiamari
- KPT Officers Society
- Machar Colony
- Maripur
- Masroor Colony
- Mubarak Goth
- Rais Goth
- Rehman Goth
- Salehabad
- Shams Pir
- Sher Shah
- Somar Goth
- Sultanabad

== Sports ==
Kemari has many semi-professional football teams, including:

- Keamari Muhammadan
- Keamari Union FC
- Society Brothers FC (formed 2010, dissolved 2014)
- Mohammad Eleven FC
- Ayaaz Eleven FC
- Usman Shaheed FC (Shirin Jinnah Colony)
- Northern Loon FC (formed 2014, present)

== Gallery ==
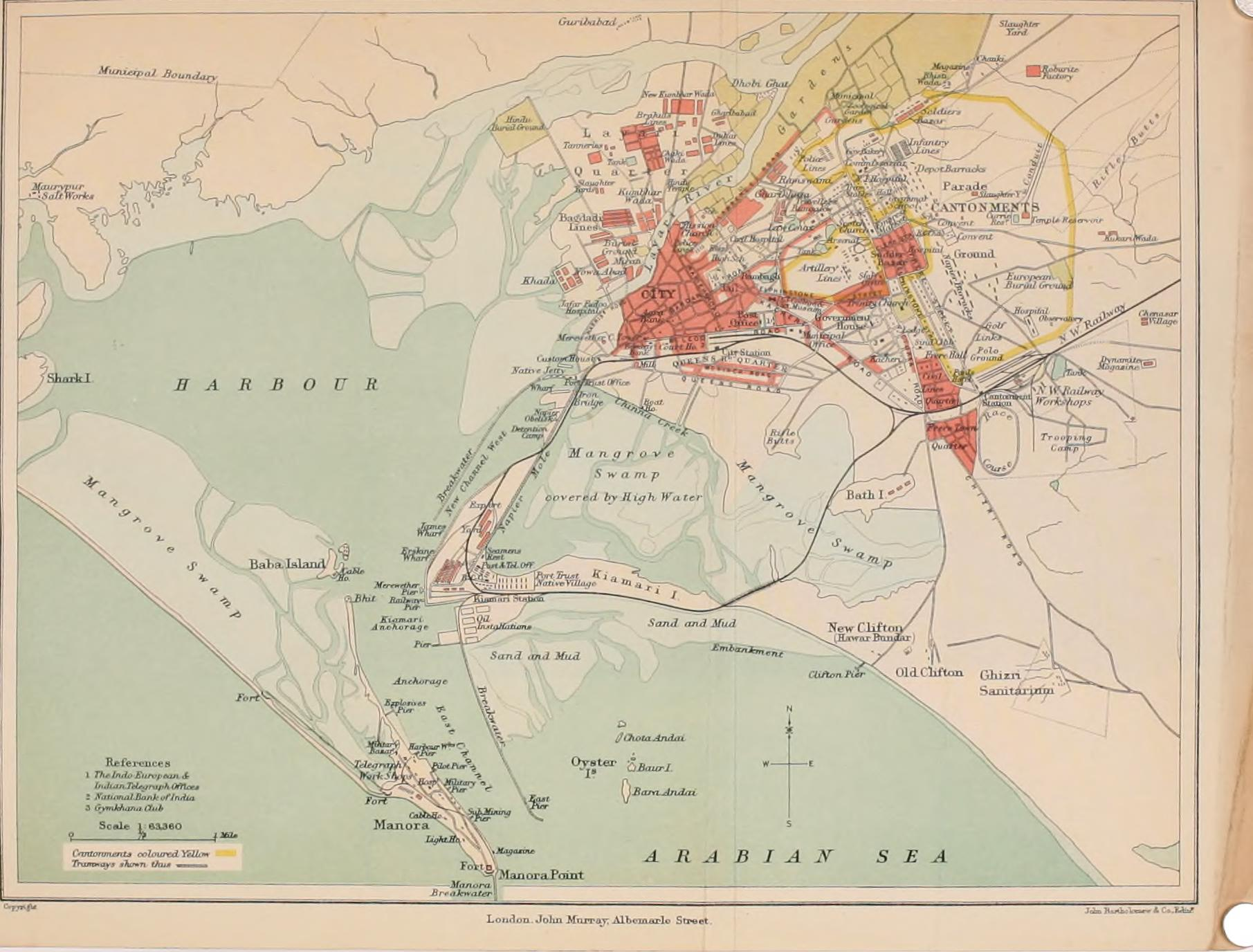
In 1911, Keamari was still an island

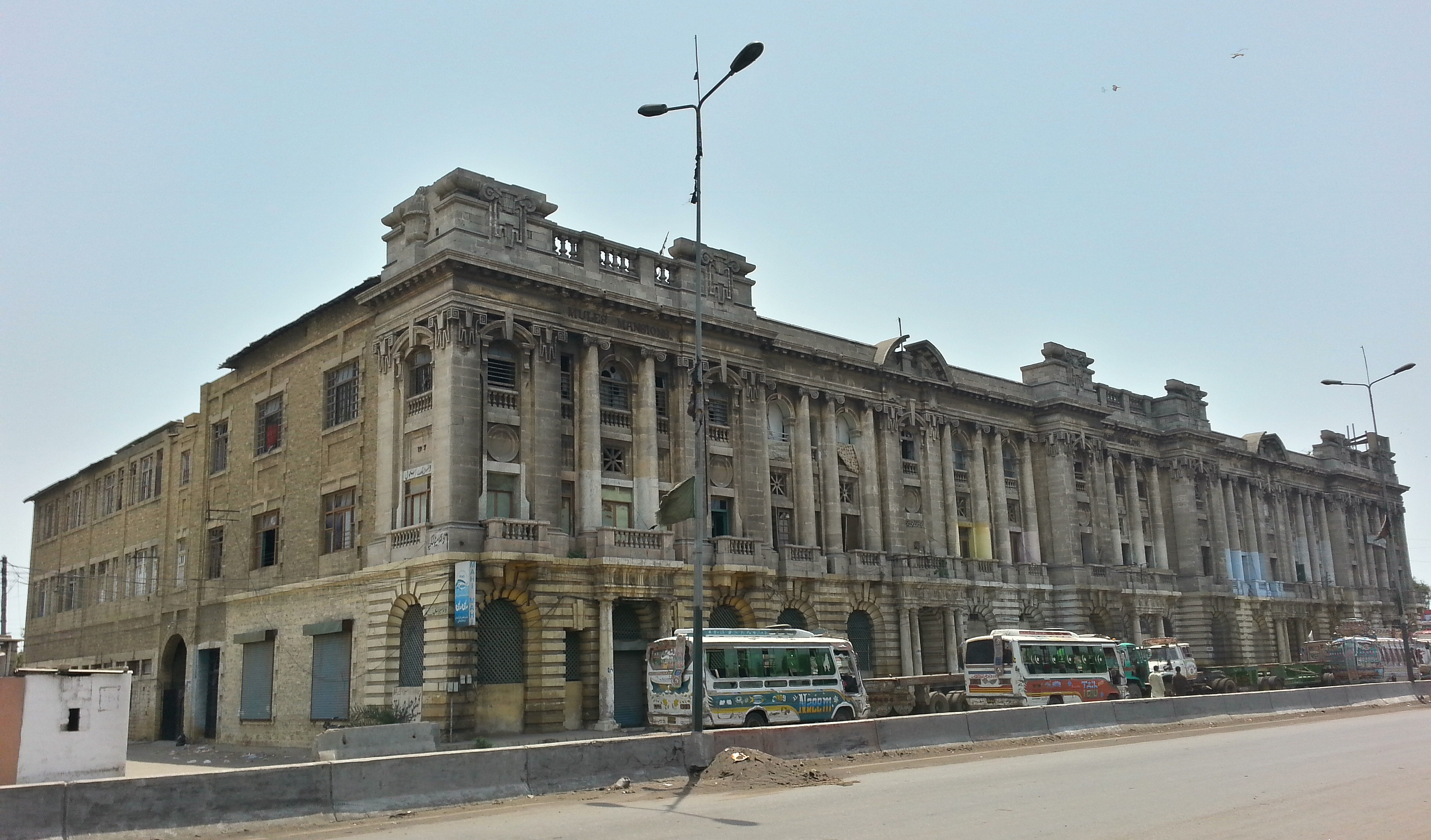
Keamari's Mules Mansion built in 1917, was designed by Iraqi-Jewish architect Moses Somake

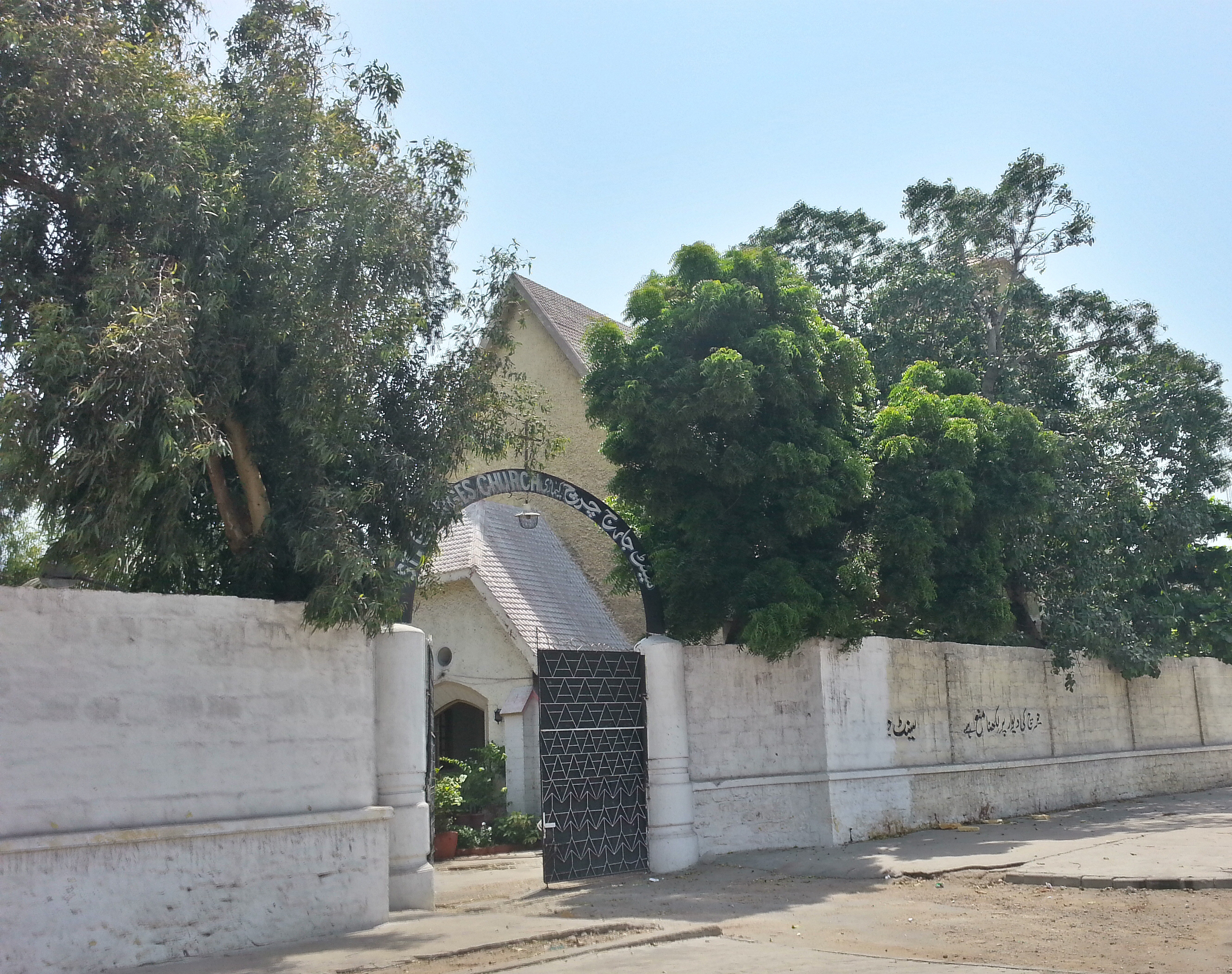
St George's church dates from the colonial era

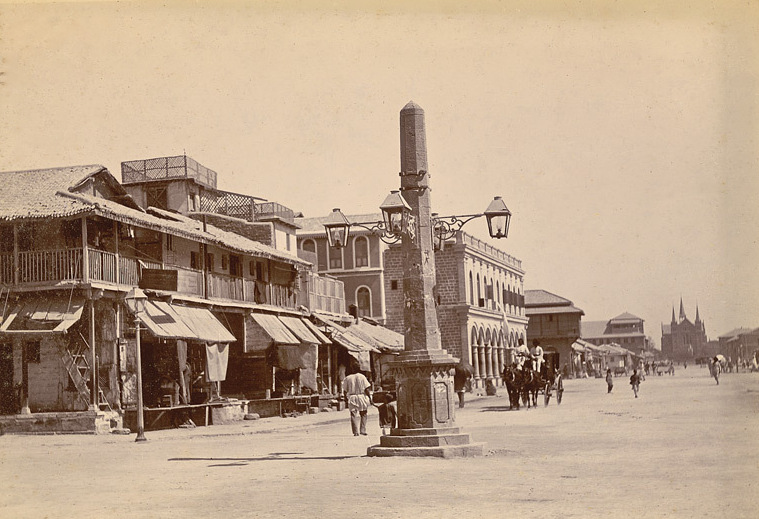
The head of Napier Mole Bridge on the mainland

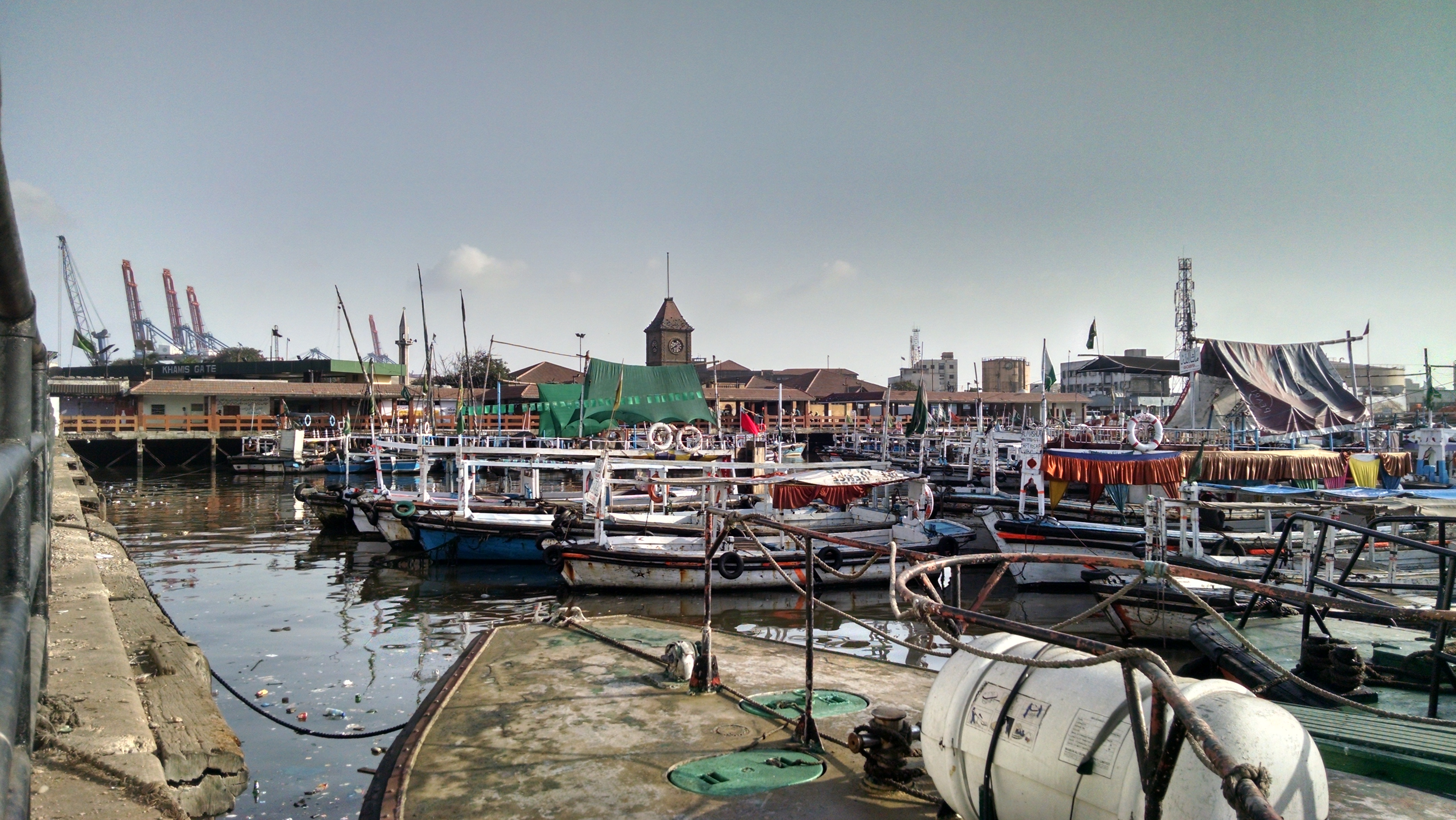
A view of Keamari Harbour

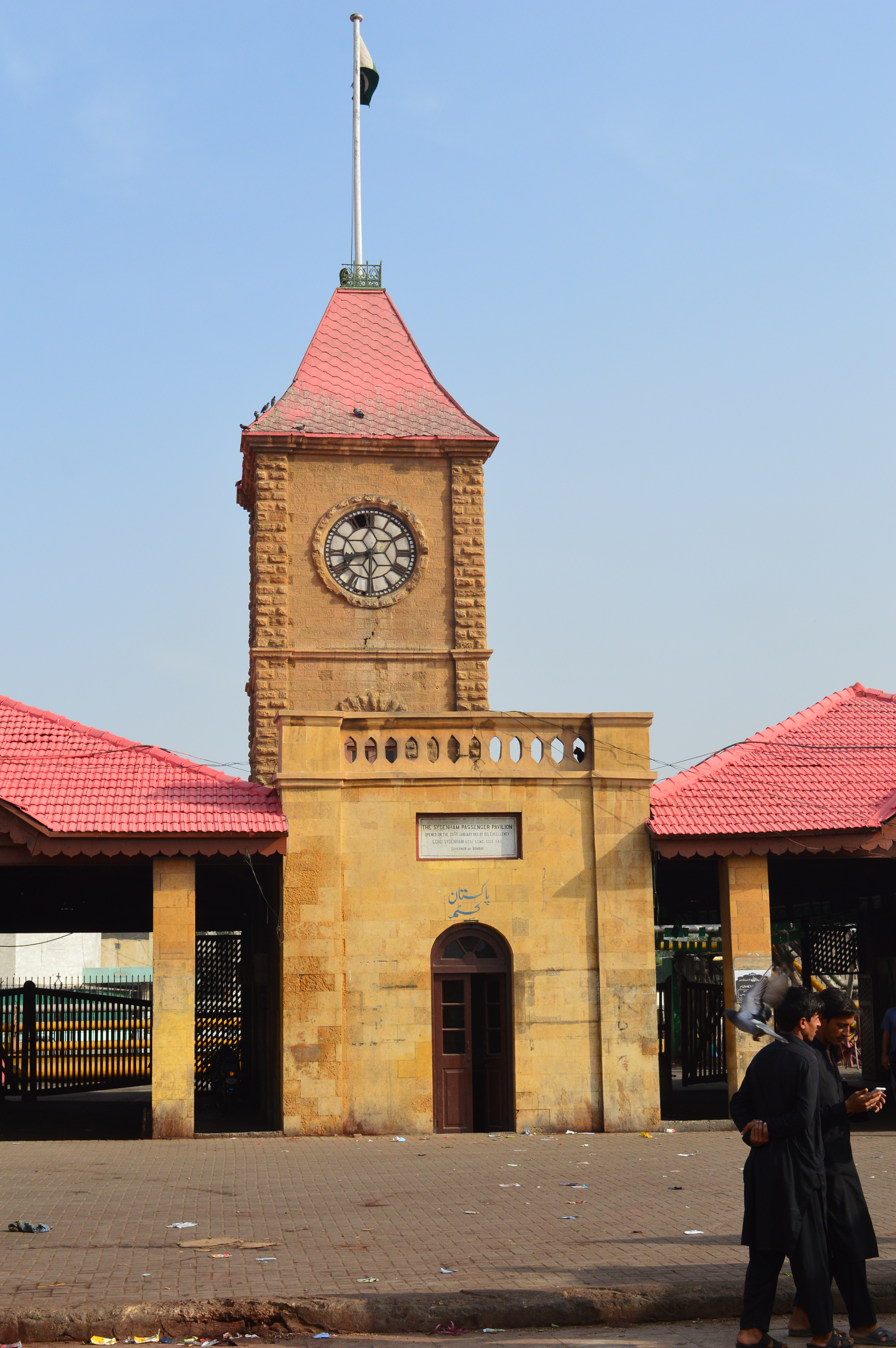
Sydenham Passenger Pavilion, inaugurated in 1914

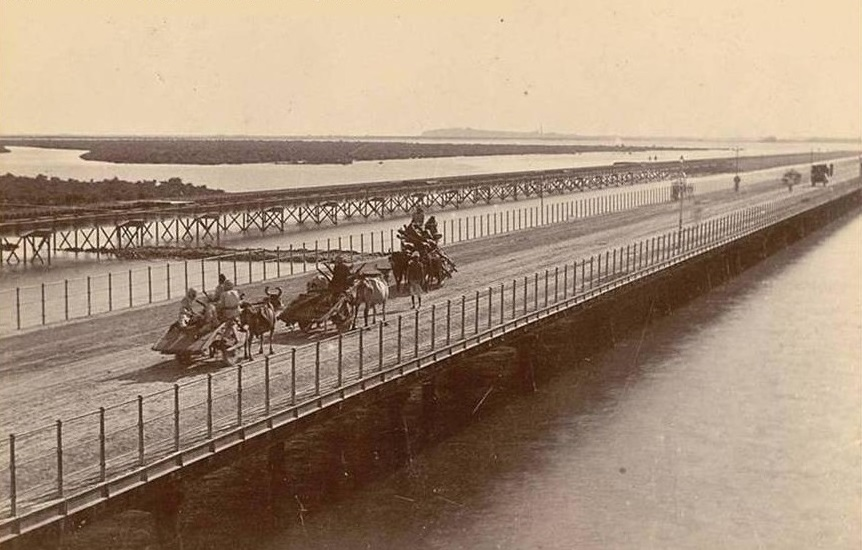
Native Jetty bridge in 1900

== See also ==
- Keamari District
