= Sikandrabad Colony, Abbottabad =

Sikandrabad Colony Abbottabad (Urdu:سکندرآبادکالونی) is a residential colony in the city of Abbottabad.The colony is located in the north-east of Jinnahabad Colony & Habibullah colony, in the east of Comsat University Abbottabad campus and just adjacent to north side of Pakistan Military Academy Kakul Abbottabad, in the old Mirpur Maira of Union council Mirpur, Abbottabad. The Colony is lying between 34°11′46″N 73°15′35″E at an altitude of 1298 meters (4257 Feet). The name Sikandr is cabled from the ancestral owner of the land Haji Sikandr Khan. The distance of the colony from Missile chowk Mandian is about 04 kilometers via Jinnahabad Colony & Habibullah colony through Raza Khan Road. Moreover, from Ayub Medical Complex through Comsat University road via Mirpur Maira road, the colony is accessed by covering about 03 kilometers.
