= Abdul Rehman Goth =

Neighbourhood in Karachi, Pakistan

Coordinates: 24°51′N 66°55′E

Abdul Rehman Goth is a neighbourhood of Keamari Town located 24.1 km from downtown Karachi, Sindh, Pakistan. It is located on Hawke's Bay, near French Beach.

Abdul Rehman Goth is a fishing village that has existed for centuries and has been notable for its residents' conflict with the operators of the Karachi Nuclear Power Complex over fishing rights in the sea nearby.
