= KPT Officers Society =

Disputed area of land in Karachi

KPT Officers Society is a disputed area in Karachi, Pakistan. The Karachi Port Trust (KPT), through its entity, the Karachi Port Trust Cooperative Housing Society, had planned this area as a residential neighbourhood.

Since 1887, KPT has controlled the eastern mangrove-covered flank of Chinna Creek. Known as the Mai Kolachi bypass land due to its location on both sides of Mai Kolachi Road, the southern part toward Chinna Creek was once rich with mangroves and had a natural seawater passage. Now, it lies barren, and the seawater flow is obstructed.

== The dispute ==
There has been a legal dispute over this land between the KPT housing society and the Sindh Government due to the intention to build here. There was even the plan to build a Port Tower Complex, a 593-metre (1,947 ft) tall skyscraper proposed for construction in KPT Officers Society. To cultivate and make 53 hectares (130 acres) habitable, land was reclaimed from the Chinna Creek and the natural habitat was further reduced. The KPT housing society claimed that the land was owned by the KPT which had allotted the land and its lease. In 2018, despite the land never formally being transferred from the provincial government to the KPT, the Sindh High Court decided in favour of the housing society, after 18 years of litigation.

In February 2020, the Supreme Court of Pakistan declared the allocation of the disputed land by the Karachi Port Trust Cooperative Housing Society as illegal. The Court has ruled that KPT is not legally authorised to establish housing societies for its employees, nor to lease, transfer, or sell the port's property or land to them. It also re-directed the KPT to ensure re-plantation of mangroves and restore the natural seawater flow, which extends to Sultanabad and Bath Island area.

The heavy rainfall in 2021 revealed that the illegal construction by the KPT Officers Housing Society hindered the absorption of rainwater, leading to flooding.
