= Somar Goth =

Neighbourhood in Karachi, Pakistan

Coordinates: 24°51′N 66°55′E

Somar Goth is a neighbourhood of Keamari Town in Karachi, Sindh, Pakistan.

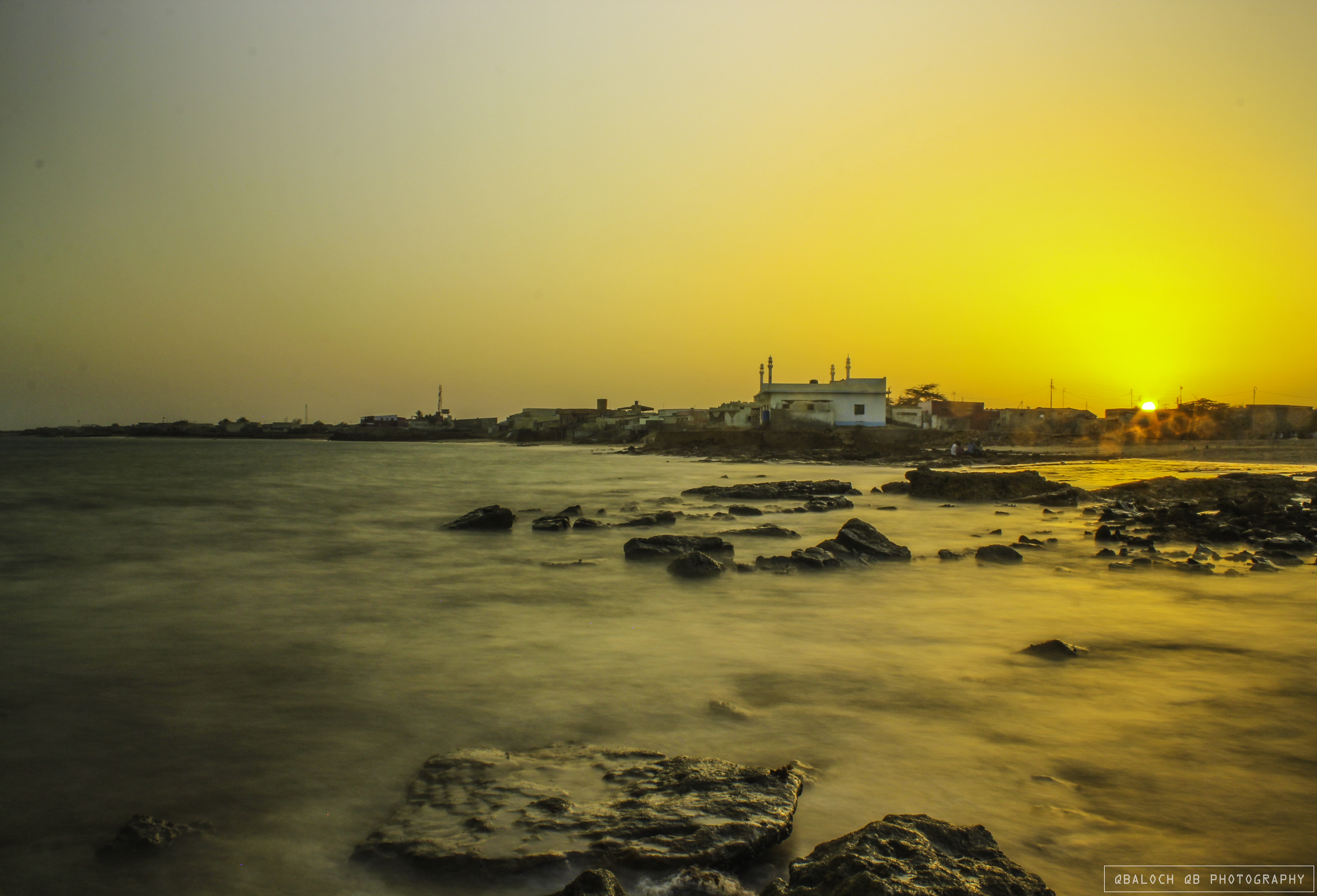
Somar Goth
