= Willem Iskander =

Indonesian writer, nationalist, and educator

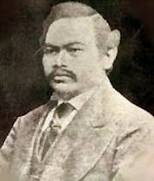
- Born: Sati Nasution; 1840; Pidoli Lombang, Dutch East Indies
- Died: 1876 (aged 35–36); Amsterdam, Netherlands
- Resting place: Zorgvlied beegraafplaats, Amsterdam
- Spouse: Maria Christina

Willem Iskander (1840–1876) was a writer, nationalist, teacher and educator from the Dutch East Indies. He advocated for native Indonesian education in Dutch colonial times from North Sumatra. He founded Teacher Education School (Dutch: Kweekschool Voor inlandsche onderwijzer) in 1862 in Tano Bato, Mandailing Natal Regency.

== Early life ==
Willem Iskander (baptismal name in Arnhem, 1858) was born in Pidoli Lombang, the son of Raja Tinating. He was the 11th generation of the Nasution clan. His family came from the royal house in Mandailing. He graduated from Elementary School (Dutch: Holland Inlandsche School), Panyabungan, 1853–1855. He worked in this school as teacher when he was 15, the school's youngest teacher.

== Career ==
He worked in Mandailing-Angkola Asisten resident office as Administrator of the government (Dutch: Adjunt Inlandsche schrifer).

In 1857, he studied in the Netherlands. He studied Vreswjik, then at Oefenschool for teaching assistant. In 1861, he returned to Indonesia and founded Kweekschool Voor Inlandche Onderwijzr in Tano Bato, Mandailing Natal Regency in 1862.

In 1874, he again visited the Netherlands to participate in the Head Teacher Education title study.

In January 1876, he married Maria Christina, but died in April of that year.

== Bibliography ==
- Iskander, W. (1872). Si-boeloes-boeloes, Si-roemboek-roemboek, Sada boekoe basaon (in Batak Mandailing).
