= Sadri Skander =

Tunisian Tv presenter and producer

- صدري إسكندر
- Born: April 10, 1982 (age 43); Tunis, Tunisia
- Education: Automotive Institute of Le Mans
- Occupations: Television presenter, television producer, entrepreneur and editor-in-chief
- Years active: 2011-present
- Known for: Auto Plus, AutoPRO
- Website: Official website

Sadri Skander (Arabic: صدري إسكندر, born April 10, 1982) is a Tunisian TV presenter and producer, entrepreneur and editor-in-chief. He is the first Auto TV show since 2011 in Tunisia. He is editor and chief editor of Tunisie Automobile magazine. He also produced and presented programs Drive and Fast on Tunisna TV, 100% Auto on Nessma, Auto Plus on El Hiwar El Tounsi, AutoPRO on Attessia TV.

== Early life and education ==
Born on April 10, 1982, in Tunis, Tunisia, he lived in Paris until the age of twelve, before returning to Tunis where he studied at the Lycée Gustave Flaubert. Graduated from the Faculty of Economics and Management of Aix-Marseille III University with a CCA specialization control, accounting and audit, he decided to enroll at the Higher Institute of Automotive Trade in Le Mans, from which he graduated in 2008.

He then joined the Opel marketing department for a year and a half before returning to Tunisia in 2009 and launching AutoPRO, a company for the sale and take-back of used vehicles, with the parallel idea of launching Auto TV programm at the end of 2011.

== Career ==
In 2015, Sadri Skander launched a bimonthly Tunisia automotive magazine (French: Tunisie Automobile).

In April 2017, Sadri launched AutoPRO, the largest used vehicle sales center in Tunisia.

In October 2018, he signed with a partaneriat with Italcar, representative of Fiat, Alfa Romeo, Jeep and Lancia and with Stafim representative of STAFIM the official importer of Peugeot, in May 2019.

In January 2020, he became the face of the Bridgestone brand on the Tunisian market during his contract with the commercial rubber tire company S.C.P.

== TV career ==
Late 2011 early 2012, he began a TV career with Drive and Fast on Tunisina TV until 2013.

In 2013- 2014, he presented the television show 100% Auto on Nessma.

Between 2014 and 2018, he is presenter and co-producer of the auto TV show Auto Plus and at the same time he presented Karhabtek Labess on El Hiwar El Tounsi.

Since 2018, he has co-produced and hosted the AutoPRO TV show on the Attessia TV channel. The TV show deals with automotive news in Tunisia and internationally. Reports test drivers, comparisons and covers of car shows, but also large formats for meetings with personalities related to the automotive world in Tunisia and aboard.

== Personal life ==
Sadri married Chirine.

== Selected works ==
=== TV programs ===
Year	Name	Channel
2012-2013	Drive and Fast	Tunisna TV
2013-2014	100% Auto	Nessma
2014-2018	Auto Plus	El Hiwar El Tounsi
2018-2020	AutoPRO	Attessia TV
