= Machi Goth =

ماچھی گوٹھ
- City/Town
- Machhi Goth
- Location within Pakistan Location within Punjab, Pakistan
- Coordinates: 28°18′N 70°07′E
- Country: Pakistan
- Province: Punjab
- District: Rahim Yar Khan
- Tehsil: Sadiqabad Tehsil

Area
  - Total: 4 km^{2} (1.5 sq mi)
- Time zone: UTC+5 (PST)
- Calling code: 068

Machi Goth (Punjabi and Urdu: ماچھی گوٹھ) is a small city/town in Sadiqabad Tehsil of Rahim Yar Khan District in Punjab province of Pakistan. Fauji Fertilizer Company (FFC) is located in Machi Goth.
