= Gories Mere =

Indonesian businessman (born 1954)

Gregorius "Gories" Mere (born in East Flores, 17 November 1954) is an Indonesian businessman and retired senior-ranking officer of the Indonesian National Police (POLRI).

Prior to his retirement in 2012, Mere was Director of the National Anti-Narcotics Agency (BNN), holding the rank of Commissioner General, a three-star general equivalent.

Mere holds multiple positions, including Chief Operations Officer for Hendropriyono Strategic Consulting . He is also Independent Commissioner and Commissioner, respectively, for PT Bumi Resources Minerals Tbk mineral resources holding company and Darma Henwa Tbk mining services.

== Career ==
Mere is a 1976 graduate of AKPOL, or the Indonesian National Police academy.

Mere gained prominence as senior investigator for the 2002 Bali Bombings, which led to the formation of the Indonesian National Police (POLRI)'s counter-terrorism task force, Detachment 88, which he effectively commanded for several years. For his service in support of the 2002 Bali Bombing investigations, in 2003 Mere was awarded the Honorary Australia Medal by the Australian Government. Mere is regarded as one of Indonesia's foremost experts on counter-terrorism.

Mere held multiple POLRI posts throughout his distinguished career, including deputy director of Regional Police Command (POLDA) and the Criminal Investigation Agency (BARESKRIM).

== Career & Assignments ==
- Chief Operating Officer (COO), Hendropriyono Strategic Consulting
- Independent Commissioner, Bumi Resources Minerals Tbk PT, 2013-PRESENT
- Commissioner, Darma Henwa Tbk PT, 2013-PRESENT
- Director, National Narcotics Board (BNN), 2009-2012
- Deputy Director, POLRI Badan Reserse Kriminal (BARESKRIM), 2005-2008
- Commander, POLRI Detachment 88 (DETASEMEN 88)
