= Sikandarpur =

Sikandarpur سکندر پور
- Town and Union Council
- Location in Haripur Sikandarpur (Asia)
- Coordinates: 34.0036°N 72.9345°E
- Country: Pakistan
- Region: Khyber Pakhtunkhwa
- District: Haripur District
- Time zone: UTC+5 (PST)

Sikandarpur (Urdu: سکندر پور) is one of the 44 Union Councils, administrative subdivisions, of Haripur District in the Khyber Pakhtunkhwa province of Pakistan. It is located at 34°0'22N 72°56'13E about 28 mi (or 45 km) north of Islamabad, the country's capital city.
