= Noer Muhammad Iskandar =

Indonesian Islamic cleric (1955–2020)

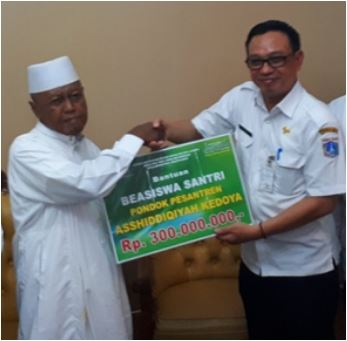
- Noer Muhammad Iskandar (left) when he received a scholarship from the government official in 2018
- Born: 5 July 1955; Banyuwangi, Indonesia
- Died: 13 December 2020 (aged 65); Jakarta, Indonesia
- Occupation: Islamic cleric
- Known for: founder of the Islamic boarding school (pesantren) that applies intellectualization of the santris

Noer Muhammad Iskandar (5 July 1955 – 13 December 2020) was an Indonesian Islamic cleric (kyai) who also the head and the founder of the Ash-Shiddiqiyah Islamic Boarding School. He was also often invited to fill the dawah programme on national television.

He was well known as a kyai who found the pesantren which applies the santris intellectualization principle, that a santri must be able to understand the symbols of the Koran as more than just understanding God's commands, but must be returned to the actualization steps in everyday life. In his time, this principle was contrasted with the Koran teaching in the pesantren which was only dogmatic and on the other hand in the secular schools, the Koran was taught in a rationalistic approach. He founded the Ash-Shiddiqiyah pesantren in 1985.

== Personal life and education ==
He was born in the village of Sumber Beras, Banyuwangi, East Java. He was the ninth of eleven children from the couple Iskandar and Robiatun. His father was also a kyai.

After completing his studies in the Lirboyo pesantren, Iskandar continued his studies in Institut PTIQ Jakarta and got his diploma in the field Koran teaching in 1974.

He was married to Siti Nur Jazilah in 1982. His wife is a daughter of Mashudi, a kyai from Tumpang, Malang. His wedding was witnessed by the kyais from Lirboyo, Kediri and Tebuireng, Jombang, Makhrus Aly, and Adlan Aly, respectively.

== Death ==
He died on 13 December 2020.
