= Sikandarpur, Mainpuri =

Village in Uttar Pradesh, India

Sikandarpur
- Village
- Location in Uttar Pradesh, India
- Coordinates: 27.26666°N 79.06634°E
- Country: India
- State: Uttar Pradesh
- District: Mainpuri
- Tehsil: Mainpuri

Area
  - Total: 4.992 km^{2} (1.927 sq mi)

Population (2011)
  - Total: 3,569
  - Density: 714.9/km^{2} (1,852/sq mi)
- Time zone: UTC+5:30 (IST)
- PIN: 205001

Sikandarpur is a village in Mainpuri block of Mainpuri district, Uttar Pradesh. As of 2011, it had a population of 3,569, in 547 households.

== Demographics ==
As of 2011, Sikandarpur had a population of 3,569, in 547 households. This population was 53.2% male (1,897) and 46.8% female (1,672). The 0-6 age group numbered 627 (335 male and 292 female), or 17.6% of the total population. 419 residents were members of Scheduled Castes, or 11.7% of the total.

The 1981 census recorded Sikandarpur as having a population of 1,925 people, in 308 households.

The 1961 census recorded Sikandarpur as comprising 3 hamlets, with a total population of 1,171 people (605 male and 566 female), in 250 households and 197 physical houses. The area of the village was given as 1,239 acres.

== Infrastructure ==
As of 2011, Sikandarpur had 2 primary schools; it did not have any healthcare facilities. Drinking water was provided by well, hand pump, and tube well; there were no public toilets. The village had a post office but no public library; there was at least some access to electricity for all purposes. Streets were made of both kachcha and pakka materials.
