= Rais Goth =

Neighbourhood in Karachi, Pakistan

Coordinates: 24°51′N 66°55′E

- Neighborhood
- Interactive map of Rais Goth

Rais Goth is a neighbourhood of Keamari Town in the southern part of Karachi, Sindh, Pakistan.
