= Sa'id ben Hasan of Alexandria =

Egyptian writer

Sa'id ben Hasan of Alexandria (Arabic: سعيد بن حسن الاسكندراني, romanized: Saʿīd bin Ḥasan al-Iskandarī; fl. 13th–14th centuries) was a Jewish convert to Islam.

== Work ==
Sa'id ben Hasan authored an apologetic tract titled Kitāb Masālik al-Naẓar, composed in Damascus in April 1320. In it, he aims to prove the genuineness of Muhammad's mission using evidence from the Tanakh. Sa'id accuses the Jews of corrupting the Biblical text and substituting other names for those of Muhammad and Ishmael. He also sometimes inserts his own words into Biblical passages when quoting them in Arabic translation.

The book begins with an account of Sa'id's conversion to Islam in May 1298. According to his narrative, while on his deathbed, he had a dream in which a heavenly voice instructed him to recite the surah Al-Fatiha in order to escape death. Sa'id obeyed the command and miraculously recovered.

Sa'id envisioned Islam as the supreme and only religion, and advocated for extreme measures against other beliefs, including the closure of non-Islamic houses of worship.
