= Bhutta Village =

Neighbourhood in Karachi

Coordinates: 24°49′N 67°00′E

Bhutta بھٹا گاوں
- Village
- Interactive map of Bhutta
- Country: Pakistan
- Province: Sindh
- City: Karachi
- District: Karachi West
- Time zone: UTC+5 (PST)
- Postal code: 75300

Bhutta Village (Urdu: بھٹا گاوں) is a village in Karachi, Pakistan, which is near Keamari and the Karachi Port.

Bhutta village faces significant administrative neglect. The mostly unplanned settlement suffers from a lack of basic infrastructure, with narrow streets, no streetlights, and unpaved lanes.

== History ==
The village is situated south of Chinna Creek. Once submerged by the sea and enveloped in mangrove swamps, the area underwent significant transformation through deforestation and land reclamation, leading to the establishment of the settlement. Originally known as Jungleabad (Urdu: جنگل آباد) due to the abundant mangroves that once thrived here, Bhutta's evolution reflects Karachi's relentless expansion and human colonisation at the expense of nature.

During the Indo-Pakistani war of 1971, the village was bombed by the Indian Air Force, resulting in over 70 civilian casualties and injuring more than 100 people.

== Demographics ==
Several different tribes live here, though Pathans and Kutchis constitute up to 90% population of this town. Other ethnic tribes living here are the Sindhi , Punjabi, Hazara and now a growing population of the Baloch, who have migrated from Lyari Town because of a Gang War Operation.

== Sports ==
Bhutta village boasts a strong tradition in football and cricket, the two most popular sports in the area. The village is home to two football clubs: Keamari Muhammadan, established in 1907. The club won several trophies in the 1970s, 1980s, and 1990s, making it the most successful club in the history of Keamari Town. The second notable club is Bhutta Muhammadan, which also contributes to the village’s rich sporting culture.
