= Chinna Creek =

Lagoon in Karachi, Pakistan

- China Creek
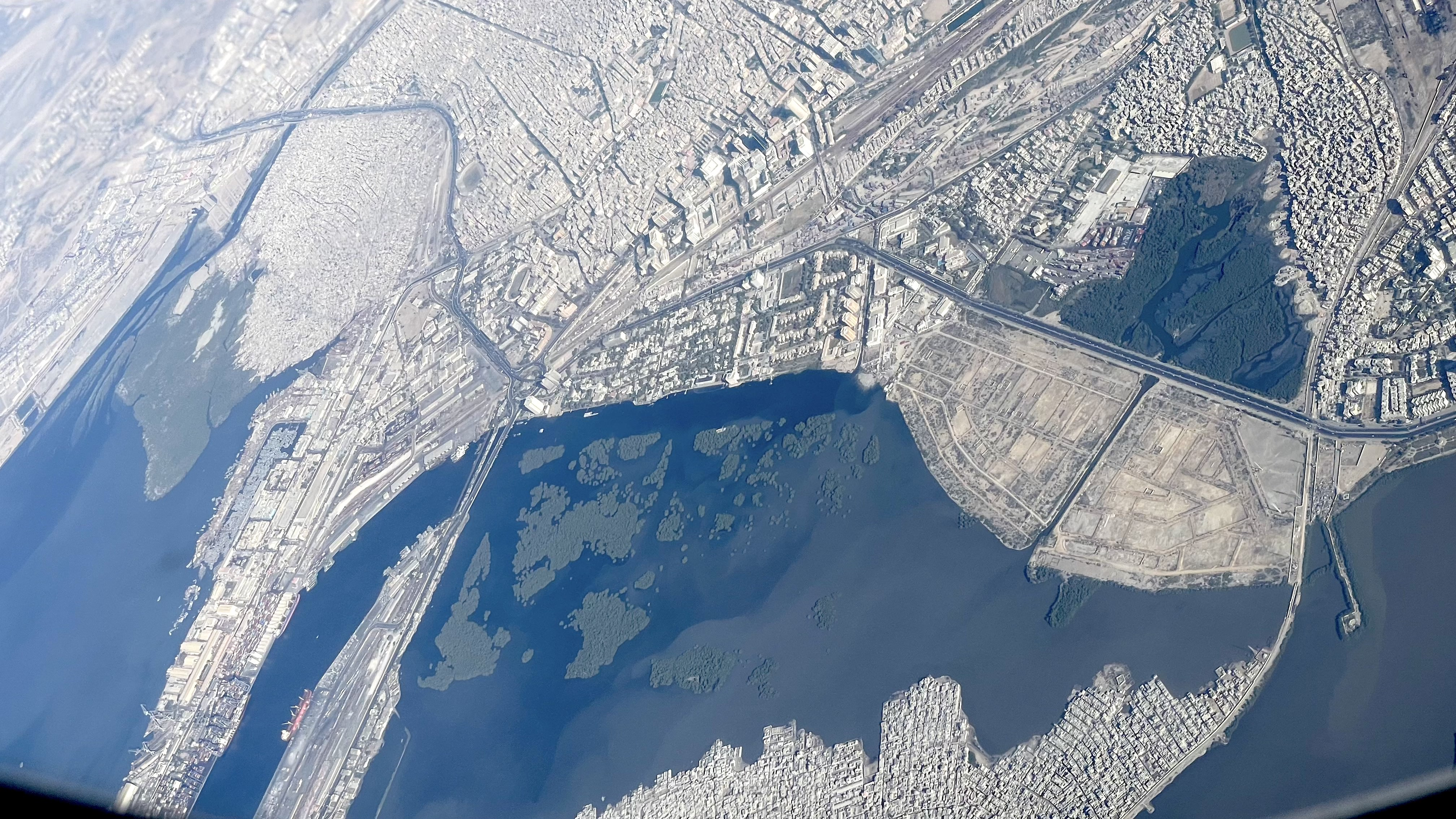
- View on the Chinna Creek and its mangroves from the sky embedded into the city
- Interactive map of Chinna Creek
- Location: Sindh
- Coordinates: 24°50′0″N 67°0′0″E
- Type: Brackish water lagoon and wetland
- Primary inflows: Boat Basin, Nehr-e-Khayyam and other sewage and wastewater channels
- Primary outflows: Arabian Sea, northern Indian Ocean
- Basin countries: Pakistan
- Max. length: 5.0 kilometres (3.1 mi)
- Max. width: 0.3–0.5 kilometres (0.19–0.31 mi)
- Surface area: 6.0 square kilometres (2.3 sq mi)
- Average depth: 1.0 m (3.3 ft)
- Max. depth: 3.0 m (9.8 ft)
- Surface elevation: 0 m (0 ft)
- Islands: Minor mangrove islands
- Settlements: Karachi

Chinna Creek (Urdu: نهر چنا) is a lagoon, within the municipal boundaries of Karachi, on the Arabian Sea coastline, located in the south-west region of Sindh, Pakistan.

Covering an area of approximately 6 square kilometres, it extends approximately 5 kilometres in length and spans between 300 and 500 metres in width, with depths ranging from 1 to 3 metres.

Chinna Creek functions as the principal training and regatta course for rowing activities organised by the adjacent Karachi Boat Club.

== Location ==
Positioned at the eastern periphery of the Karachi Harbour, Chinna Creek holds strategic importance in the maritime infrastructure of the region. The environs surrounding the creek is diverse. To its west lies the Native Jetty Bridge, with the old bridge now serving as a food promenade. The new bridge handles road traffic, while a railway bridge, used for freight trains, also leads towards Keamari. The northern bank of Chinna Creek features notable landmarks such as the building of the headquarters of the Pakistan National Shipping Corporation (PNSC), Beach Luxury Hotel, Lalazar Bungalows, Boat Club, Port House, Karachi Club, and the Naval Officers Residence.

On the eastern part behind the Naval Officers Residence and between the convergence with Boat Basin, lies barren land with obstructed seawater flow, a consequence of an extensive mid-2000s land reclamation project aimed at developing the KPT Officers Society, despite its environmental impact.

Conversely, the southern bank shares borders with East Wharf and residential areas including Bhutta Village, Sikandarabad, Majeed Colony, and Okhai Colony.

== History ==
In 1890, the area between the mainland at Kurrachee (now Karachi) and Kiamāri (now Keamari) Island was known as the "Chinna Creek Backwater" or the "Mangrove Swamp". At that time, it was described as being "completely encircled by two branches of the North Western Railway."

Prior to the establishment of the Karachi port in 1873, Chinna Creek boasted two entrances: one at the Manora channel and another at Clifton. The Clifton entrance was sealed off, redirecting its flow to utilise the western breakwater as an intertidal reservoir. The natural landscape of Chinna Creek was characterised by a lush ecosystem dominated by dense mangrove growth, predominantly consisting of the species Avicennia marina. These mangroves played a crucial role in maintaining the ecological balance of the region, providing habitat and sustenance to diverse flora and fauna endemic to the coastal areas of Karachi.

The eastern section of Chinna Creek, overseen since the 19th century by the Karachi Port Trust, was once lush with mangroves and abundant wildlife. However, efforts in recent decades to build the KPT Officers Society on 52.6 hectares (130 acres) have resulted in substantial habitat destruction. The creek's land was appropriated, and the mangroves were cleared.

== Environmental issues ==
The mangrove ecosystem of Chinna Creek not only served as a protective barrier against coastal erosion and storm surges but also contributed to the overall environmental health. However, the transformation of the creek's dynamics due to human interventions, including the closure of the Clifton entrance, had significant implications for the ecology and biodiversity of the area, altering the natural habitat and ecosystem dynamics over time.

Chinna Creek faces significant environmental challenges due to the influx of untreated wastewater and toxic waste from various sources within Karachi. The creek receives inflows of approximately 60,566 cubic metres of untreated wastewater daily, originating from the Nehr-e-Khayyam, TPX drain, and a drain associated with Habib Public School. Additionally, there is an indirect impact stemming from approximately 757,082 cubic metres per day of wastewater discharged by the Lyari River. These combined discharges have implications for the marine ecosystem of Chinna Creek, leading to the degradation and loss of natural flora and fauna essential for maintaining a stable and beneficial ecological balance.

The presence of untreated wastewater and toxic waste has placed immense pressure on the mangrove forests within the vicinity of Chinna Creek. These vital ecosystems are under severe stress due to elevated toxicity levels, resulting in detrimental effects on their health and viability. Studies have highlighted the grave pollution levels within the creek, revealing a diverse array of toxic pollutants originating from both domestic and industrial sources, posing significant risks to marine life and ecosystem integrity. Incidents like the 2013 mass fish mortality, when 100 tonnes of dead mullets were found floating in Karachi Port Trust waters, including Chinna Creek, remain little more than footnotes.

The absence of robust environmental regulations and the prevalence of illegal waste disposal practices further exacerbate the pollution burden on Chinna Creek. These factors hinder the creek's ability to maintain a natural and untouched appearance, impeding efforts to mitigate environmental degradation and restore ecological balance.

In 2018, although the Karachi Port Trust (KPT) is not directly responsible for managing marine pollution, it was tasked with establishing a treatment plant near Mai Kolachi Road along the Chinna Creek as part of a Wetland Park Project. This initiative aims to address the issue of approximately 500 million gallons of untreated sewage being dumped into the Arabian Sea daily, representing 99% of the total sewage. The plant is envisioned to initially treat 60 million gallons per day from Soldier Bazaar and City Station drains, with a later phase handling an additional 60 million gallons per day from Nehr-e-Khayyam water channel, though progress has stalled.

Political assurances to rehabilitate and preserve the creek recur regularly, yet they seldom translate into meaningful implementation.

== See also ==
- Indus River Delta–Arabian Sea mangroves
