= İskender Chitaşi =

Caucasian writer

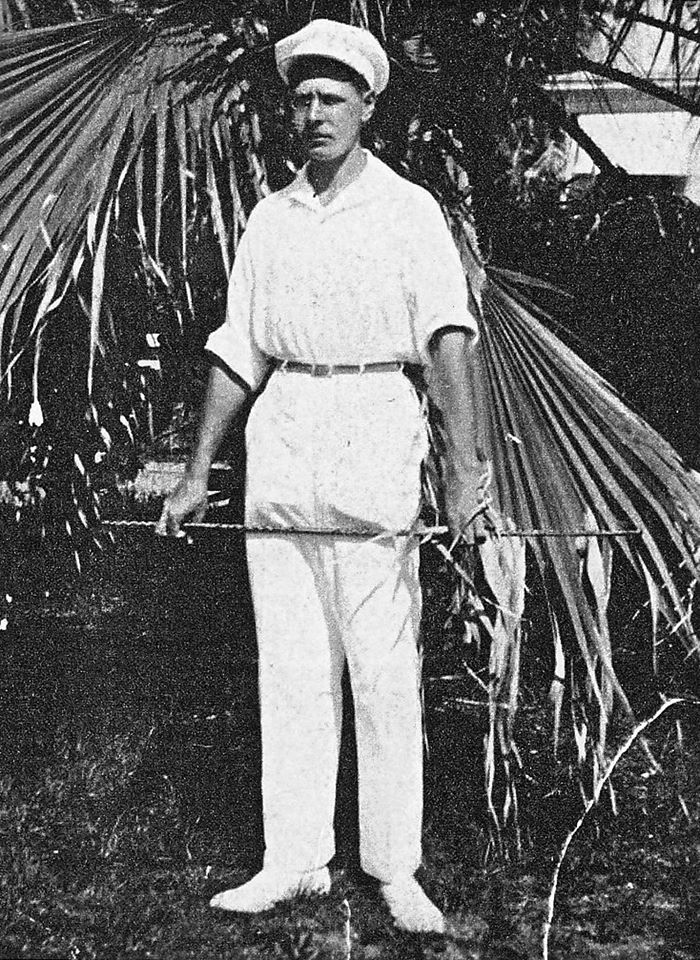
İskender Tzitaşi (İsqenderi Chitaşi)

İskender (Alexander) Chitaşi (Turkish: İskender Chitaşi, Laz: ისქენდერ წითაში Iskender Tzitaşi, Russian: Искандер Теймуразович Циташи) (1904-1938) was a Laz linguist, educator, writer, and activist. He was known for creating the first newspaper in the Laz language called "Mçita Murutsxi" (Red Star).
