= Sikandarabad, Bhopal =

Sikandarabad
- village
- Location within Madhya Pradesh Location within India
- Coordinates: 23.1770577°N 77.3008506°E
- Country: India
- State: Madhya Pradesh
- District: Bhopal
- Tehsil: Huzur
- Elevation: 526 m (1,726 ft)

Population (2011)
  - Total: 1,316
- Time zone: UTC+5:30 (IST)
- ISO 3166 code: MP-IN
- 2011 census code: 482507

Sikandarabad is a village in the Bhopal district of Madhya Pradesh, India. It is located in the Huzur tehsil and the Phanda block.

== Demographics ==
According to the 2011 census of India, Sikandarabad has 270 households. The effective literacy rate (i.e. the literacy rate of population excluding children aged 6 and below) is 67.17%.

Demographics (2011 Census)
| | Total | Male | Female |
|---|---|---|---|
| Population | 1316 | 664 | 652 |
| Children aged below 6 years | 198 | 97 | 101 |
| Scheduled caste | 153 | 80 | 73 |
| Scheduled tribe | 121 | 64 | 57 |
| Literates | 751 | 418 | 333 |
| Workers (all) | 428 | 328 | 100 |
| Main workers (total) | 332 | 265 | 67 |
| Main workers: Cultivators | 111 | 89 | 22 |
| Main workers: Agricultural labourers | 25 | 20 | 5 |
| Main workers: Household industry workers | 6 | 5 | 1 |
| Main workers: Other | 190 | 151 | 39 |
| Marginal workers (total) | 96 | 63 | 33 |
| Marginal workers: Cultivators | 3 | 2 | 1 |
| Marginal workers: Agricultural labourers | 31 | 22 | 9 |
| Marginal workers: Household industry workers | 1 | 1 | 0 |
| Marginal workers: Others | 61 | 38 | 23 |
| Non-workers | 888 | 336 | 552 |
