= İskender =

İskender is the Turkish form of the name Alexander, after Alexander the Great, and may refer to:

== People ==
- İskender Alın (born 1984), Turkish footballer
- İskender Köksal (born 1981), Turkish footballer
- Iskender Pasha (governor of Ozi) (fl. 1620), Ottoman military commander
- Iskender Pasha (governor of Egypt) (fl. 1555–1559), Ottoman governor of Egypt
- İskender Chitaşi (1904-1938) A Laz Linguist, writer and activist
- Skanderbeg (1405–1468), Albanian hero, Ottoman military commander
- Alexander (son of Ivan Shishman) (died 1418), Bulgarian prince who converted to Islam

== Other uses ==
- İskender kebap, Turkish dish invented by İskender Efendi
- Eskandar, East Azerbaijan, a village in East Azerbaijan Province, Iran
- İskender, Edirne

== See also ==
- Iskandar
- Iskandar (name)
- Skanderbeg
