= Military installations in Karachi =

The Military installations in Karachi are extensive as the Pakistani military has several military bases for all branches of its uniform services. The Pakistan Army has six military bases, that are noted as Cantts, while the Karachi Port serves as the main naval base for the Pakistan Navy and Qasim Fort as the headquarter for the Pakistan Marines. The Pakistan Air Force has three air force bases in Karachi.

== Pakistan Army installations in Karachi ==
The V Corps, also known as Victory Corps, is an administrative corps of Pakistan Army assigned in Karachi, Sindh province of Pakistan. The V Corps is the only corps that is stationed in the Sindh Province, while the II Strike Corps and the IV Corps are both stationed in Punjab Province. It is headquartered in Karachi, and currently commanded by Lieutenant-General Naveed Mukhtar.

=== Cantonments in Karachi ===
- Army Base Clifton
- Faisal Cantonment
- Karachi Cantonment
- Korangi Creek Cantonment
- Malir Cantonment
- Manora Cantonment

== Pakistan Navy installations in Karachi ==
- Naval Academy
- PNS Karsaz
- PNS Rahat
- PNS Shifa
- PNS Abdoze
- Fleet Acoustic Research and Classification Center

=== Naval Bases ===
- Naval Base Karachi
- PNS Iqbal
- PNS Himalaya

=== Naval Air Stations ===
- PNS Mehran
- PNS Himalaya

=== Coast Guard and Maritime Security Agency ===
- Karachi Port Trust Building

== Pakistan Marine Installations in Karachi ==
- Marine Base Qasim
- Marine Headquarters Qasim Fort

== Pakistan Air Force installations in Karachi ==
=== Non-flying Air Force Base ===
- Malir Air Force Base
- Korangi-Creek Air Force Base

=== Air Force Bases in Karachi ===
- Faisal Air Force Base
- Masroor Air Force Base

== See also ==
- List of Pakistan Air Force Bases
- List of forts in Pakistan
