= Abdur Rauf (officer) =

Commander in the Bangladesh Navy

- আব্দুর রউফ
- Born: 11 November 1933; Bhairab, Bengal Presidency, British India
- Died: 27 February 2015 (aged 81); Dhaka, Bangladesh
- Military career
- Allegiance: Pakistan (before 1971); Bangladesh
- Branch: Pakistan Navy; Bangladesh Navy
- Service years: 1962–1976
- Rank: Commander
- Commands: BNS Titumir
- Awards: Independence Day Award

Abdur Rauf (11 November 1933 – 27 February 2015) was a commander of the Bangladesh Navy and a politician. He served as a member of the presidium of the People's Forum. He was one of the accused in the Agartala conspiracy case filed in 1968. In 2011, the Bangla Academy awarded him an honorary fellowship. For his special contribution to the war of liberation, the government of Bangladesh posthumously awarded him the Independence Day Award in 2020.

== Early life and education ==
Rauf was born on 11 November 1933 in Bhairab. His father, Abdul Latif, was chairman of the local municipality. He passed his matriculation from Bhairab K. B. Pilot Model High School in 1951. He passed his intermediate from Dhaka College in 1953. He obtained his bachelor's degree from Dhaka College in 1955. He obtained his master's degree from University of Dhaka. In 1961 he obtained his Bachelor of Education (B.Ed.) degree from Government Teachers' Training College, Dhaka. He was the sports secretary of Dhaka College Students' Parliament in 1951–52, general secretary of Comilla Victoria College Students' Parliament in 1953-54 and general secretary of Fazlul Haque Hall of University of Dhaka in 1955–56.

== Career ==
Rauf joined the BAF Shaheen College Dhaka as vice principal in 1961. Later he quit his teaching job and joined the Pakistan Navy in 1962. He was trained in PNS Himalaya and later in PNS Karsaz. He was commissioned in the Education Corps of the Pakistan Navy. After getting commission he was posted to PNS Bahadur. In 1964 Lieutenant Rauf was posted to PNS Bakhtiar as training instructor. From March 1965 to June 1966 he served in Dhaka as naval recruiting officer. He was transferred to PNS Karsaz in 1966. He was arrested on 3 January 1968 for being involved in the Independent Bangladesh Movement while on duty. He spent 14 months in jail with Sheikh Mujibur Rahman in the Agartala conspiracy case. He was later released in 1969 after a mass uprising but was dismissed from the Navy.

After being dismissed from the Navy, he was appointed as the principal of Narsingdi College. He was an important organizer of the Bangladesh Liberation war. He was one of the members of the three-member board of directors of the special guerrilla force comprising youths of NAP and student unions led by Mozaffar Ahmed.

He joined the Bangladesh Navy in August 1972 with the rank of a lieutenant commander and was appointed as the commanding officer of BNS Titumir. He was promoted to the rank of commander in 1973. After the assassination of Sheikh Mujibur Rahman in 1975, he was imprisoned. He was released and sent to forced retirement in 1976. In 1976 he was appointed as the principal of Rangunia College. He served there till 1978. In 1978 he founded an NGO that works for the development of the backward communities. He founded Gano Forum with Kamal Hossain in 1993 and was a member of the presidium of Gano Forum till his death.

== Death ==
Rauf died on 26 February 2015 at the Combined Military Hospital, Dhaka, Bangladesh.

== Awards ==
- Bangla Academy Fellowship 2011
- Independence Day Award 2020
