= Pakistan Navy School of Logistics and Management =

Pakistan navy's staff college in Karachi

School of Logistics and Management
- Badge of Pakistan Navy
- Active: 1970; 56 years ago
- Country: Pakistan
- Branch: Pakistan Navy
- Type: Training formation
- Garrison/HQ: Faisal Cantt, Karachi, Sindh in Pakistan
- Nicknames: L&M

The School of Logistics & Management, commonly known as the PNS Logistics & Management or L & M School, is a military staff college located in the Faisal Cantonment in Karachi, Sindh, Pakistan. The L&M provides the Pakistan Navy with education and training in logistics, management, leadership and the administration.

The L&M prides itself being the "Home of Logisticians."

== History ==
The Pakistan Navy's School of Logistics and Management (L&M) originally was based in the PNS Himalaya, which is the only bootcamp of the navy, in Monora Island. In August 1970, the L&M moved in the premises of the PNS Karsaz– the navy's training formation for technical vocation. In 1987, the L&M underwent major modernization with its own independent building, functions, course curriculums, ward room and its own classrooms; it became an independent training formation in 1995. Currently, the L&M is permanently based in Faisal Cantonment in Karachi, Sindh, Pakistan.

The management of the school reports to the Commander Karachi, and provides training and education to naval officers, sailors, and other allied officers on management, administration, military logistics, inventories and depot infrastructure.

== Academic structure ==
The School of Logistics and Management (L&M) mission is focused on training.

== See also ==
- Institute of Business Administration, Karachi
