= Karachay (disambiguation) =

Karachay may refer to:

- Karachay, a member of the Karachays, an indigenous people of the North Caucasus
- Karachay-Balkar language spoken by them
- Karachay Autonomous Oblast, a former autonomous unit in the Soviet Union
- Novy Karachay, a town in the Karachay-Cherkess Republic, Russia
- Lake Karachay, a lake in the Ural mountains of Russia
- Karachay horse, a horse breed from the region

== See also ==
- Karaçay (disambiguation)
- Karachi (disambiguation)
- Qarachi (disambiguation)
