= Karachi (disambiguation) =

Karachi is the largest city in Pakistan.

Karachi may also refer to:

- Karachi Cantonment
- Karachi Division
- Karachi Central District
- Karachi East District
- Karachi South District
- Karachi West District
- New Karachi Town
- List of people from Karachi

== Other ==
- Karachay–Cherkessia
- Karachay Autonomous Oblast
- Karachay–Cherkess Autonomous Oblast
- Karachiman, a village in Azerbaijan.
- Karachiya, a town in Gujarat, India.
- Karachik
- Kulachi (tribe)
- Karashi
- Zafar Karachiwala, Indian film actor
- Karachia
- Garachi, a Romany ethnic group of Azerbaijan

== See also ==
- Qarachi (disambiguation)
- Krachi (disambiguation)
- Kilinochchi District of Sri Lanka, also known as Karachchi
