= Military academies in Pakistan =

The Pakistan military services have established number of training schools, academies, universities and command & staff colleges across the Pakistan for the purpose of training soldiers and officers in military science, warfare command and strategy and associated technologies.

Flag of the Pakistan Armed Forces

== Education and training ==
- School of Armour and Mechanized Warfare
- Military College of Engineering
- Military College of Signals
- Military College Jhelum
- Air University Pakistan
- College of Electrical and Mechanical Engineering
- Parachute Training School
- Officers Training School
- Army High Altitude School
- Army Desert Warfare School
- School of Infantry and Tactics
- School of Army Strategic Forces

== Pakistan Army ==
The major training institutions of Pakistan Army are:

- Pakistan Military Academy: Pakistan Military Academy also known as PMA Kakul, is a Pakistan Army Officers training school located in Kakul, Abbottabad, Khyber Pakhtunkhwa. The academy was established on 25 November 1947.
- Command and Staff College: a Pakistan Army training college where officers receive staff training and education located in Quetta, Baluchistan. The college was temporarily established in 1905 at Deolali and later shifted to Quetta in 1907.
- Military colleges have been established in Jhelum, Murree, Sui on the order of GHQ, functioning under the DG-HRDC;These are established to provide Military education to wards of Civilians and Armed forces.These Military colleges are feeding institutions to the Pakistan Military Academy
- There are some cadet colleges under Pakistan army they are operating by army and government

== Pakistan Air Force ==
The major training institutions of Pakistan Air Force are:

- Pakistan Air Force Academy: The Pakistan Air Force Academy also Known as PAF Academy Risalpur, is an Air Force officers training school located in Risalpur, Nowshera, Khyber Pakhtunkhwa. The academy was established in 1910.
- Pakistan Air Force Airmen Academy:
- College of Flying Training: The College of Flying Training (CFT) is an Air Force officers and airmen flying training school located in Risalpur, Nowshera District, Khyber-Pakhtunkhwa.
- College of Aeronautical Engineering: The College of Aeronautical Engineering (CAE) is an Air Force officers and airmen aeronautical engineering training school located in Risalpur, Nowshera District, Khyber-Pakhtunkhwa. The college was established in 1965.
- Pre Trade Training School: The Pre Trade Training School (PTTS) is a Pakistan Air Force airmen training school for recruits located in Kohat Khyber-Pakhtunkhwa.
- PAF Airpower Centre of Excellence

== Pakistan Navy ==
The major training institutions of Pakistan Navy are:

- Pakistan Naval Academy: The Pakistan Naval Academy also known as Pakistan Naval Ship Rahbar (PNS Rahbar), is a Navy officers' training school located Manora, Karachi, Sindh. The academy was established on December 8, 1970.
- Pakistan Naval Station Himalaya (PNS Himalaya): The Pakistan Naval Ship Himalaya is a primary boot camp training school for newly enlisted Pakistan Navy sailors located in Manora Island, Karachi, Sindh. The training academy was established in 1943.
- Pakistan Navy School of Logistics and Management

== Pakistan Merchant Navy ==
The major training institutions of Pakistan Marine are:

- Pakistan Marine Academy:

== Pakistan Coast Guard ==
The major training institutions of Pakistan Coast Guards are:

- Pakistan Coast Guards Training Center (Korangi)

== Inter-Services Academies ==
The major training institutions of Pakistan Armed Forces are:

- National Defense University: The National Defense University, a Pakistan Armed Forces training university dedicated to the study and research in military science, geo-strategy and international relations, located in Islamabad, The university was established in 1970.
- PAF Air War College: The Pakistan Air Force Air War College, a Pakistan Air Force training college for primarily to the mid-career officers of Pakistan Air Force and limited number of officers from Pakistan Navy, Pakistan Army and officers of various Allied forces. The college was established in 1958 and located in Karachi.
- Pakistan Naval War College: The Pakistan Naval War College, a Pakistan Navy training college for primarily to the mid-career officers of Pakistan Navy and limited number of officers from Pakistan Air Force, Pakistan Army and officers of various Allied forces. The college was established in 1968 and located in Lahore.

== Medical Personnel ==
- Armed Forces Post Graduate Medical Institute
- Army Medical College
- Pakistan Military Academy

== See also ==
- List of medical schools in Pakistan
- List of cadet colleges in Pakistan
