= Manora Fort =

Manora Fort may refer to:

- Manora Fort, Karachi, Karachi, Sindh, Pakistan
- Manora Fort, Thanjavur, Thanjavur, India

See also

- Manora, Karachi, in Karachi, Sindh, Pakistan
- Manora Island, an island in Karachi, Sindh, Pakistan
- Manora Cantonment, in Karachi, Sindh, Pakistan
- Manora, Washim, a taluka in Washim district of Maharashtra, India
