= Karachi Naval Dockyard =

State-owned shipbuilding and maintenance facilities for the Pakistan navy

- Part of Logistics Command
- Karachi coast, Sindh, Pakistan in Pakistan
- Badge of Pakistan Navy

Site information
- Type: Logistics
- Owner: Ministry of Defence
- Operator: Pakistan Navy
- Controlled by: Logistics Command
- Open to the public: No

Site history
- Built: 1947; 79 years ago
- Events: Cold War

Garrison information
- Current commander: Rear-Admiral Mazhar Mahmood Malik
- Garrison: Repairs and Maintenance Group

The Karachi Naval Dockyard (officially: PN Dockyard), or Naval Base Karachi is a principle base for the Pakistan Navy located off the Karachi coast and adjacent to the commercial premises of the KESW Ltd. and the PNS Qasim, the marine base.

The Karachi Naval Dockyard is also a marine propulsion production base for the Pakistan Navy and has undertaken the shipbuilding and maintenance works on behalf of the Ministry of Defense.

== Overview ==
In 1947, the Pakistan Navy inherited the dockyard from the Royal Navy Dockyard and it was the only naval base that the country had inherited with the division of the British Royal Indian Navy. At that time, the dockyard was a very small repairing facility with only 500 members of the workforce as its employees.

In 1952, the scope of the base expanded into navy's full repair and reproduction of British navy's equipment and began to focus on hiring civilian engineers to support the navy's maintenance programs. In 1963, Karachi Naval Dockyard was selected as nation's first submarine base when the PNS Ghazi reported for her duty, followed by establishment of the Submarine Training Center in 1964. In 1980, the Submarine Training Center was moved to PNS Bahadur before establishing its own facility as PNS Abdoze in 1990.

The base later moved towards building the ships and the boats for the navy and was termed as navy's weapons production complex. Until 1993, the base's production program was only for the Navy but it was brought under the Ministry of Defence (MoD) in 1994.

The Karachi Naval Dockyard has designed and built fast missile boats and the police patrol boats as part of its extended programs under the Ministry of Defence (MoD). Since 1990s, the Karachi Naval Dockyard has worked on the Marine propulsion technology and worked on building the propulsion system for the Agosta 90B submarines, Italian-designed and Chinese-designed warships.
