= Krachi =

Krachi may refer to:

- Krachi West District, an administrative unit of Ghana
- Kete Krachi, a town in Krachi West District
- Krachi East District, an administrative unit of Ghana
- Krachi West (Ghana parliament constituency), a constituency in Ghana
- Krachi East (Ghana parliament constituency), a constituency in Ghana
- Krachi language, spoken in Ghana

== See also ==
- Karachi (disambiguation)
- Crachi, a brand of chocolate
- Kratié (disambiguation), places in Cambodia
