= Michael John O'Brian =

Pakistan Deputy Chief of Air Staff (1928–1995)

Air Vice Marshal Michael John O'Brian
- مائیکل جان اوبرائن
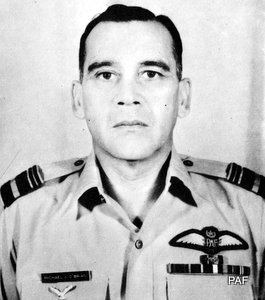
- Portrait, c. 1974

Commandant National Defence College, Islamabad
- In office 1 September 1975 – 9 April 1976
- Preceded by: M. Rahim Khan

7th Deputy Chief of Air Staff Pakistan Air Force
- In office 13 May 1974 – 31 August 1975
- Chief of Air Staff: ACM Zulfiqar Ali Khan

Commander PAF Base Korangi Creek
- In office February 1973 – July 1974
- Preceded by: Anwar Shamim

12th Commandant PAF Academy
- In office September 1969 – February 1973
- Preceded by: Saeedullah Khan
- Succeeded by: Zulfiqar Ali Khan

Wing Commander No. 35 Wing
- In office 1 August 1961 – 28 January 1962

Personal details
- Born: 1 May 1928 Lahore, Punjab Province (British India)
- Died: 1 December 1995 (aged 67) Islamabad, Pakistan
- Spouse: June Brown (m. 1949)
- Nickname(s): Micky O'Brian; M.J. O'Brian

Military service
- Branch/service: Royal Indian Air Force (1946-1947); Pakistan Air Force (1947-1978)
- Years of service: 1946-1978
- Rank: Air Vice Marshal
- Unit: No. 9 Squadron PAF
- Commands: PAF Base Korangi Creek; PAF Academy; No. 35 Wing
- Battles/wars: Indo-Pakistani War of 1947; Indo-Pakistani War of 1965; Air war operations
- Awards: Golden Eagle Award (Pakistan)
- Service number: PAK/3337

Michael John O'Brian (Note: Urdu: مائیکل جان اوبرائن) (5 January 1928 — 1 December 1995) known as M.J. O'Brian and Micky O'Brian was among the pioneering officers of the Pakistan Air Force and two-star rank air officer who holds the distinction of being the only Air Force officer to serve as Commandant of the National Defence College, Islamabad from 1975 to 1976. Prior to that, he served as the seventh Deputy Chief of Air Staff from 1974 to 1975 and was one of the distinguished Christian pilots who participated in the Indo-Pakistani War of 1947 and 1965.

Throughout his career, he served as Base Commander PAF Base Korangi Creek, Commandant PAF Academy, and Commander No. 35 Wing.

== Early life ==
Of Irish descent, Michael John O'Brian was born on 1 May 1928 into a Christian family in Lahore. His brother, Charles O'Brian was an Excise and Taxation officer in Sargodha.

== Personal life ==
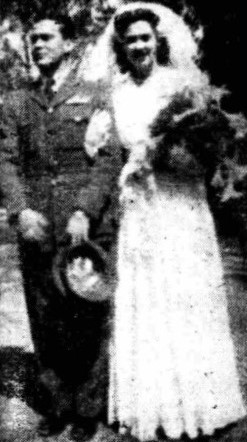
O'Brian with his wife June Brown on their wedding day, 1949

Flying Officer M. J. O'Brian married June Brown on 18 April 1949, at St. Anthony's Church on Empress Road, Lahore. Both families were very old residents of Lahore. The bride had won the title of 'Miss Karachi 1949' in a beauty competition.

== Service years ==
=== Royal Indian Air Force ===
Michael John O'Brian enlisted in the Royal Indian Air Force on 29 April 1946 after graduating the 39 Course of the Initial Training Wing, Pune. He was promoted to Pilot Officer on 29 October 1946.

On 9 December 1946, he was struck by a Spitfire Mk XIVe while parked in his Spitfire LF Mk VIII at RIAF Station Ambala. There were no injuries. He was promoted to Flying Officer on 29 April 1947.

=== Pakistan Air Force ===
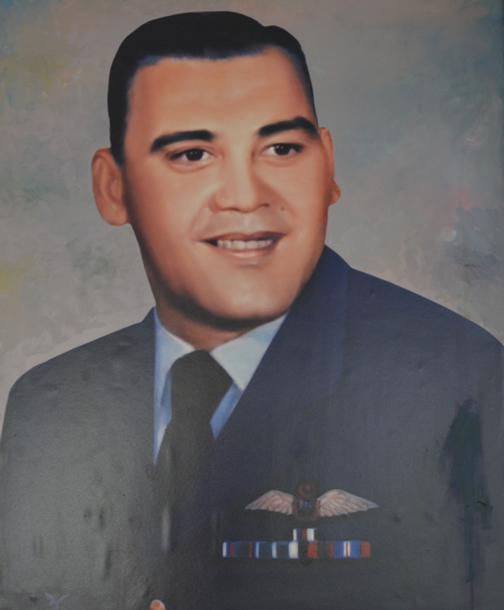
O'Brian's portrait at the National Defence College, Islamabad, 1974

After the Partition of British India in August 1947, he joined the Royal Pakistan Air Force and participated in the Indo-Pakistani War of 1947.

He was promoted to Wing Commander on 1 August 1961 and commanded the No. 35 Wing PAF until 28 January 1962.

O'Brian played an important role in setting up the training institutes within the Pakistan Air Force. He was appointed as the 12th Commandant PAF Academy in September 1969 until February 1973 when he was given command of PAF Base Korangi Creek.

On 13 May 1974, O'Brian was appointed as the Deputy Chief of Air Staff until 31 August 1975. The following day, he became the first officer of the PAF to be appointed as the Commandant of the National Defence College, Islamabad.

On 22 April 1976, Commandant O'Brian led a delegation of the college on a visit to Peking, China where banquets were held by both countries for each other. The Pakistani delegation returned to Pakistan on 3 May 1976.

==== Retirement ====
He retired from the Air Force in April 1978.

== Death ==
He lived a quiet life and died on 1 December 1995.

== See also ==
- Nazir Latif
- Eric G. Hall
- Mervyn Middlecoat
- Peter Christy
