= Air officer commanding =

Title for Air Force officers holding certain command appointments

Air Officer Commanding (AOC) is a title given in the air forces of Commonwealth (and some other) nations to an air officer who holds a command appointment which typically comprises a large, organized collection of air force assets. Thus, an air vice marshal might be the AOC 38 Group. The equivalent term for army officers is general officer commanding (GOC), from where the air force term was derived.

An air officer heading a particularly large or important command may be called an Air Officer Commanding-in-Chief (AOC-in-C).

== Royal Air Force usage ==
In the RAF those air officers who command a group are styled air officer commanding, followed by the name of the group. Currently, there are five AOCs:

- AOC 1 Group
- AOC 2 Group
- AOC 11 Group
- AOC 22 Group
- AOC No. 83 Expeditionary Air Group, a dual hat for the United Kingdom Air Component Commander in the Middle East.

The Royal Air Force had Air Officers Commanding-in-Chief at the helm of its operational commands until the post of AOC-in-C Air Command was abolished in 2012. Today, Air Command (the RAF's sole command) is run directly by the Chief of the Air Staff.

Some important historical RAF commands (in chronological order of existence) with AOC-in-Cs include:

- Strike Command (1968–2007)
- Personnel and Training Command (1994–2007)
- Logistics Command (1994–2000)
- Support Command (1973–1994)
- Training Command (1968–1977; 1936–1940)
- Maintenance Command (1938–1973)
- Air Support Command (1967–1972)
- Coastal Command (1936–1969)
- Signals Command (1958–1969)
- Technical Training Command (1940–1968)
- Flying Training Command (1940–1968)
- Fighter Command (1936–1968)
- Bomber Command (1936–1968)
- Transport Command (1943–1967)
- Home Command (1950–1959)

Arguably the most well known Air Officer Commanding-in-Chief was Arthur Harris, who served as AOC-in-C Bomber Command during the Second World War.

== Indian Air Force usage ==
In the IAF, Officers of the rank of Air Commodore who command Wings, Base Repair Depots, Equipment Depots and Air Bases are styled as Air Officer Commanding (AOC). Similarly, Air Vice Marshals commanding Groups (like the J&K Group & Maritime Air Ops Group) and Advance Headquarters are styled as Air Officer Commanding (AOC).

Senior Air Marshals who command the Seven Air Commands are styled as Air Officer Commanding-in-Chief (AOC-in-C). The Seven appointments are :

- Air Officer Commanding-in-Chief Central Air Command
- Air Officer Commanding-in-Chief Eastern Air Command
- Air Officer Commanding-in-Chief Southern Air Command
- Air Officer Commanding-in-Chief South Western Air Command
- Air Officer Commanding-in-Chief Western Air Command
- Air Officer Commanding-in-Chief Training Command
- Air Officer Commanding-in-Chief Maintenance Command

== United States Air Force usage ==
In the United States Air Force, the term "Air Officer Commanding" is used specifically to refer to the specially selected officers who command cadet squadrons and groups at the United States Air Force Academy in Colorado Springs, Colorado. In the case of a cadet squadron, the AOC is normally a major or a lieutenant colonel. These officers exercise command authority over their cadet units and are expected to train cadets in officership and military matters, advise the cadets who hold leadership positions in the unit, and act as role models for the future officers.

Although the vast majority of AOCs at the academy are, logically, United States Air Force officers, a small number may come from the Army. While holding these positions at the Academy, these officers are still referred to as "Air Officers Commanding" despite their being Army officers who may or may not be aviators.
