= PAF Base Korangi Creek =

Military Airbase in Karachi

Coordinates: 24°46′55″N 67°8′10″E

- IATA: none; ICAO: none

Summary
- Airport type: Military
- Owner: Pakistan Air Force
- Operator: Pakistan Air Force
- Serves: Karachi
- Location: Korangi Creek, Korangi Creek Cantonment, Karachi, Sindh
- Built: 1923
- In use: Royal Air Force (1923-1949); Pakistan Air Force (1949 - Present)
- Commander: Air Commodore Ibrahim Asad, TI(M), SI(Mil)
- Interactive map of PAF Base Korangi Creek

Helipads
Number	Length		Surface
Number	m	ft	Surface
		90,000

The Pakistan Air Force Base, Korangi Creek is an airbase of the Pakistan Air Force (PAF) located in Korangi, Karachi in Pakistan's Sindh province. The PAF Base Korangi Creek is a state-of-the-art facility involved in the development of the unmanned aerial vehicle (UAV) for the Pakistan Air Force.

== History ==
In 1942, the RAF leased an area of 408 hectares (1,007 acres) from the Government of Sindh and the station premises were then properly secured with a perimeter fence. Korangi Creek also served as a logistic base for the aircraft repair depot at RAF Drigh Road through the supply depot there. Aircraft engines and spare parts that were brought to Korangi Creek by amphibious aircraft were eventually transferred to Drigh Road ( now Shara-e-Faisal) to be made use of. Much of the equipment serviced by the repair depot was channeled through Korangi to Bombay to support RAF units all over British Raj. The station headquarters was closed on 1 April 1946. After the independence of Pakistan, the station continued to be commanded and manned by RAF personnel till 1949. In 1963, the School of Electronics (SOE) was moved from PAF Station Malir to Korangi Creek to become the sister institution of the SOA.

== See also ==
- Korangi Creek
- Faisal Cantonment
- Karachi Naval Dockyard
- Military installations in Karachi
- PAF Base Faisal
- PAF Base Masroor
