= Karaçay =

Karaçay can refer to:

- Emrah Karaçay
- Karaçay, Honaz
- Karaçay, Nazilli
- Karaçay, Osmancık
- Karaçay, Pazarcık
- Karaçay, Sungurlu

== See also ==
- Karachay (disambiguation)
