= PNS Bahadur =

Pakistan Navy's training formation on operations & navigation

Coordinates: 24.8946°N 67.1007°E

- Badge of Pakistan Navy
- Active: 1981; 45 years ago
- Country: Pakistan
- Branch: Pakistan Navy
- Type: Training formation
- Garrison/HQ: Karachi Cantt, Sindh in Pakistan
- Nickname: BAHADUR

The Pakistan Navy Station Bahadur (reporting name: PNS Bahadur) is a military training school located in Karachi Cantonment, Sindh, Pakistan.

The PNS Bahadur provides education, training, qualification and certifications to its personnel on seaborne-military operation, navigation, military communications, military music, and the military law enforcement.

The PNS Badur distinguished itself as Navy's "Maritime Operations Training Complex."

== History ==
The scope of military training of Pakistan Navy was very limited and based in PNS Himalaya– the Navy's only basic training boot camp in Manora Island in Karachi coast– until 1971 when the limited scope was moved to Pakistan Naval Academy in Karachi. In 1981, the Pakistan Navy repurposed PNS Bahadur by established the schools of navigation and operations, surface warfare, submarine warfare, and communication. In June 1983, PNS Bahadur was recommissioned and is permanently based in Karachi Cantonment, Sindh.

In 1984, the School of Hydrography was established which was followed by establishment of the Navy School of Music and Electronic Warfare Training Centre– both in 1993. In 1997, the Navy School of Regulating and Provost was established along with the Academic Centre in 1998. The operational scope and its objectives were further expanded in 2002 when the Navy School of Information Warfare and Reconnaissance was elevated and established at the PNS Bahadur.

== Campus and academia ==
The Maritime Operations Training Complex is located in the premises of the PNS Bahadur and its first buildings and campus was established and inaugurated by the United States Navy in 1980. Its large complex and campus covers 45.5 acres (1,980,000 sq ft) that consists of a single administration building and various schools including the auditorium, library on military history, and dormitory that houses its personnel.

The PNS Bahadur serves its mission of conducting the instructional basis operational education that ranges from the basic–to-mid–to–advance level professional courses on various subjects and military operations for its Operations Branch. Training on military operations, electronic warfare, and military information technology is not restricted to the Navy's enlisted personnel but enlisted personnel from the Army, and Air Force have also been educated, certified, and earned their badges of qualifications from the PNS Bahadur.

The campus of the PNS Bahadur consists of ten faculties:

  - Navigation & Operations School— The Navigation & Operations School was established at PNS Himalaya in November 1949 but was shifted to PNS Bahadur in 1981. The Navigation & Operations School has also provided instruction, training and education to allied navies.
  - Surface Warfare School— The Surface Warfare School was also part of the PNS Himalaya. Originally known as the "Gunnery School" until 1949, it was established by the British Royal Navy and shifted its faculty on 13 October 1982. Since 1998, the qualification badges have been awarded by the school for navy's missile technicians for handling and operating the sea-borne surface-to-air missiles.
  - Navy Communication School— The Navy Communication School was established in February 1948, also at the PNS Himalaya. It was originally known as "Navy School of Signals", and shifted its faculty to PNS Karsaz in 1970. In June 1982, it was renamed as Navy Communication School when it was permanently positioned in PNS Bahadur.
  - Underwater Warfare School— The Underwater Warfare School was also based in PNS Himalaya when it was established in 1947. The Underwater Warfare School shifted to PNS Bahadur in 1981, and provides instructions, qualifications, and certifications to its personnel on the anti-submarine and mine warfare.
  - Navy Hydrography School— The Navy Hydrography School was originally based in PNS Zulfiqar when it was established in 1955. The Navy Hydrography School was permanently positioned in PNS Bahadur in September 1984 with a mission to provide qualifications and certifications to its personnel to be commissioned in Navy Hydrographic Office.
  - Electronic Warfare Training Centre— The Electronic Warfare Training Centre (EWTC) was established by the Navy when it realized the importance of military training on radar and military reconnaissance from seaborne platform. The Electronic Warfare Training Centre was established and permanently positioned in PNS Bahadur in 1993.
  - Navy School of Music— The Navy School of Music was originally based in PNS Dilawar when it was established in 1949. In 1982, the Navy School of Music was shifted with the Army School of Music in Abbottabad until 1992 when it was shifted back to PNS Dilawar. In July 1993, the Navy School of Music was permanently shifted to PNS Bahadur with a mission to provide qualifications and certifications to its personnel to be commissioned in Pakistan Armed Forces Band.
  - Navy Provost School— The Navy Provost School was established in PNS Bahadur in 1997 when the need for regulating and policing the law enforcement within the Navy was felt. The Naval Police was commissioned as a separate Naval Police branch from the Corps of Military Police in 1998.
  - Academic Centre— The Navy's Academic Centre was established in PNS Bahadur in 1998.
  - Information Warfare School— The Navy Information Warfare School was established in PNS Bahadur in 2002.

== See also ==
- Pakistan Naval Academy
