= Rangunia Government College =

- রাঙ্গুনিয়া সরকারী কলেজ
- Motto: শিক্ষাই শক্তি
- Motto in English: Education is Power
- Type: Government college
- Established: 1963; 63 years ago
- Location: Rangunia, Chittagong-4360, Bangladesh; 22°27′40″N 92°04′20″E
- Campus: 3 acres (village)

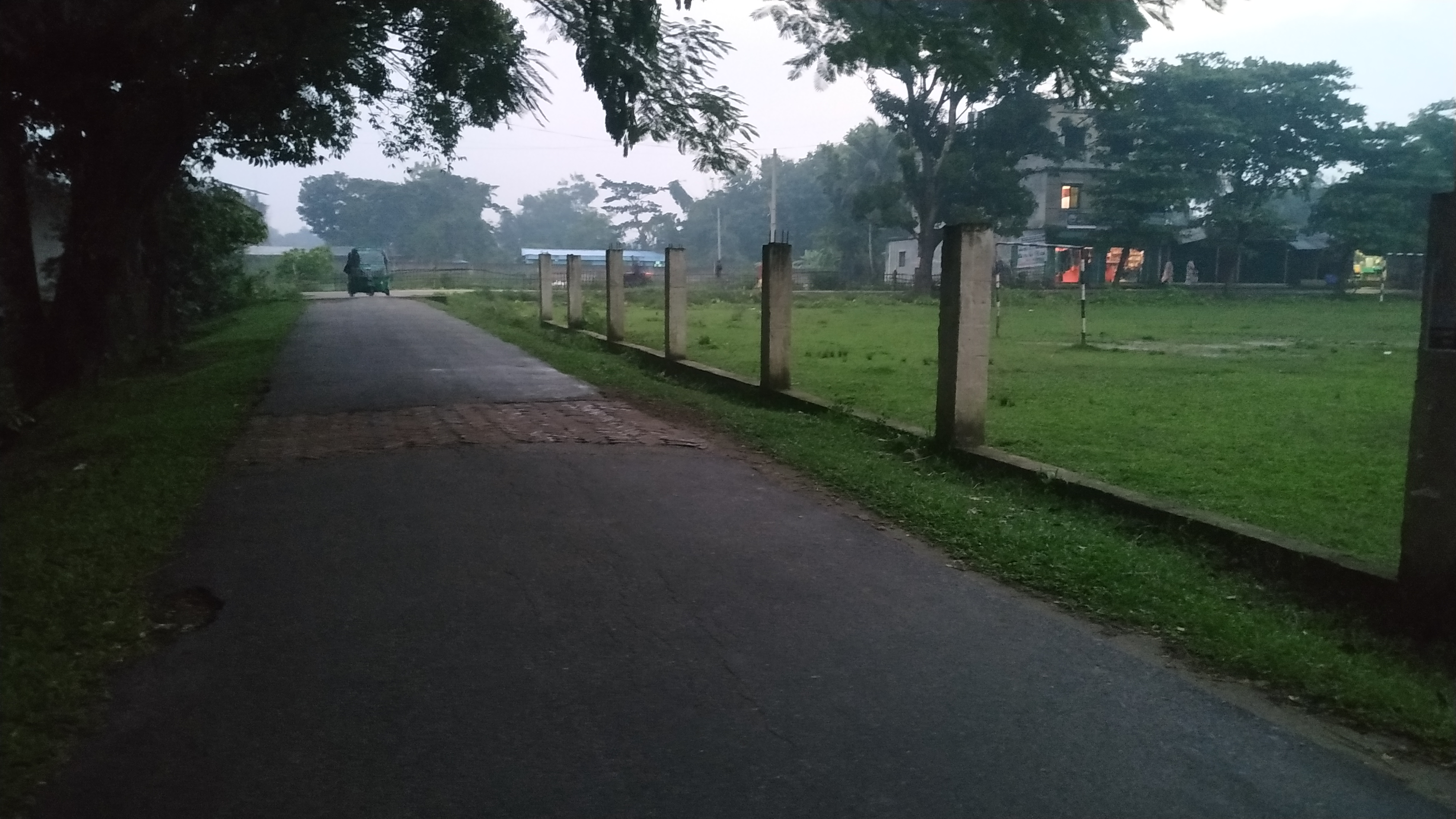
Rangunia College road

Rangunia Government College (Bengali: রাঙ্গুনিয়া সরকারী কলেজ) is a college in Rangunia Upazila, Chittagong District, Bangladesh. It was founded in 1963.

== History ==
Rangunia College was established in the centre of Rangunia Upazilla in 1963. Thirty five kilometers away from Chittagong city this institution is situated on the bank of Karnaphuly.

This centre of learning started its activities in July 1963 with the H.S.C course. In 1965 its full journey was started as a Degree College after getting the approval from Dhaka University. Honours course in Political Science and Management have started recently.

For the students there are five two-storied buildings covering two acres of land, one administrative building, residential area for the teachers and staffs, dormitory for the bachelor teachers, a large pond covering 01 acre of land, a large play ground of 023 acres. Besides this college is surrounded by 880 acres of cultivable land of its own.
