= Pakistan Marines =

Pakistan Navy Marines
- پاکستان بحریہ رہائش گاہیں واہنی
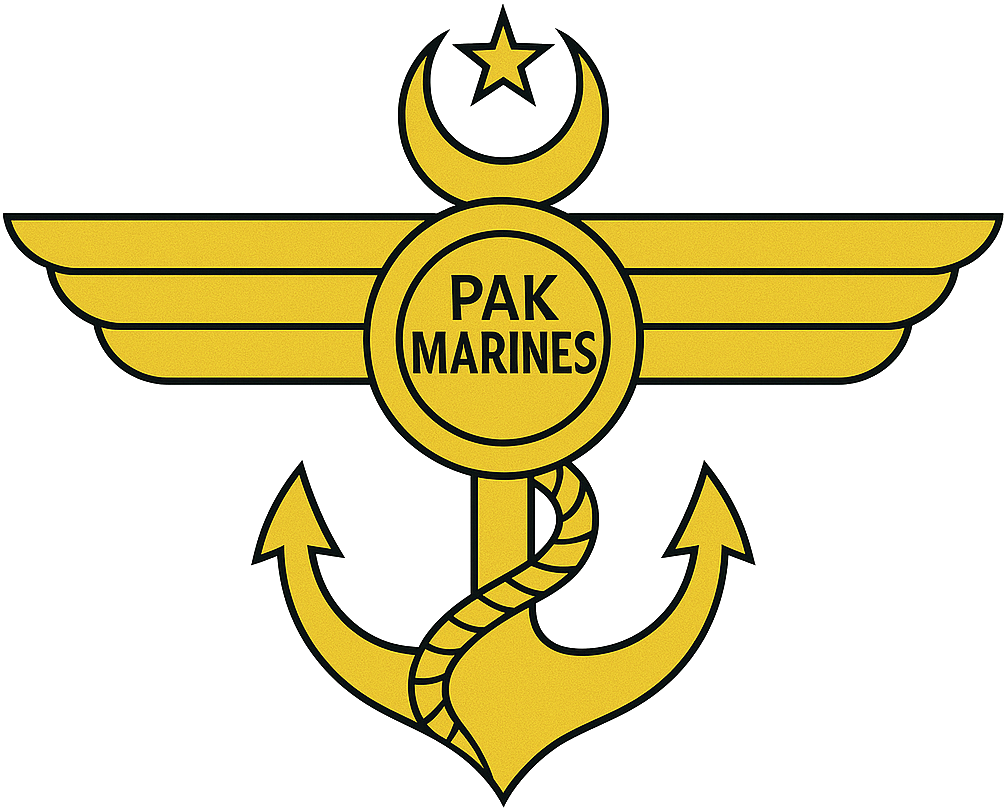
- Emblem of the Pakistan Marines
- Founded: 1 June 1971 (55 years, 4 months ago)
- Country: Pakistan
- Branch: Pakistan Navy
- Type: Marines
- Role: Amphibious warfare, Naval infantry, coastal defence
- Size: 20,000–30,000
- Part of: Pakistan Navy
- Headquarters: Manora Fort, Pak Marines Base in Karachi Coast, Sindh, Pakistan
- Nickname: Pak Marines
- Mottos: Arabic: وَ اعْتَصِمُوْا بِحَبْلِ اللّٰهِ جَمِیْعًا وَّ لَا تَفَرَّقُوْا۪ Urdu: اور اللہ کی رسی مضبوط تھام لو سب مل کر اور آپس میں بٹ نہ جانا (فرقوں میں نہ بٹ جانا); English: "And hold fast to the rope of Allah, all of you together, and do not be divided;" (Qur'an, 3:103)
- Colors
- Anniversaries: Navy Day: 6 September
- Deployments: Major conflicts and wartime operations: Indo-Pakistani War of 1971; Sir Creek incident in 1999; Atlantique incident in 1999 Indo-Pakistani wars and conflicts; Indo-Pakistani standoff in 2001; Indo-Pakistani standoff in 2008; Indo-Pakistan skirmishes in 2016 War on terror; Insurgency in Balochistan Floods in Pakistan; 2004 Indian Ocean tsunami; Operation Madad; 2010 Pakistan floods Other deployments; Operation Bright Star; Operation Enduring Freedom – Horn of Africa; Pakistan Armed Forces deployments in Saudi Arabia

Commanders
- Commander-in-Chief: President Asif Ali Zardari
- Chief of the Naval Staff: Adm. Naveed Ashraf
- Vice Chief of the Naval Staff: V/Adm. Raja Rab Nawaz
- Commandant: V/Adm. Faisal Amin HI(M)
- Arm Badge: Marines
- Flag

The Pakistan Marines (Urdu: سمندری پاکستان or پاکستان بحریہ رہائش گاہیں واہنی) or simply as Pak Marines, is an expeditionary and amphibious warfare uniform service branch within the Pakistan Navy, consisting of the naval officers and other personnel to perform their duties within the Marines. Pakistan Marines are responsible for providing force protection in littorals, using the mobility of the Pakistan Navy to provide creeks defence, ground-based coastal air defence and Force protection.

In the Pakistani military leadership structure, the Marines are the coastal defence and amphibious infantry branch within the Navy, often working closely with the Pakistan Army for training, executing expeditionary operations and logistics purposes.

Initially established and commissioned on 1 June 1971 in East-Pakistan, to assist Pakistan Army in riverine warfare. GHQ employed this infant force in successfully evacuating Pakistan Army units from encirclement by Indian Army. They were headquartered in PNS Bakhtiar and PNS Titumir to oversee the tactical riverine /waterborne operations. This small but valiant force soon started to make significant impact on retrograde waterborne operations of Pakistan and saved many lives. Post war scenario led to their decommissioning in 1974 due to no riverine area of operations left with Pakistan that time.

On 25 November 1990, the Marines were re-organized and recommissioned under Cdr. Obaidullah–since then they have been a component of the Navy, conducting expeditionary operations with the special forces of army and the navy. The Marines are primarily tasked with quick response and marine reconnaissance objectives to guard the coastal and amphibious regions of the country, and receives training at the School of Infantry and Tactics by the Pakistan Army's instructors.

In 2010, Marines, in close co-ordination with the Pakistan Army, Navy, and Air Force, were working around the clock to rescue villagers trapped by the country's worst deluge in 80 years.

== History ==
The Pakistan Marines traces their history back to East Pakistan when the infantry battalion, dedicated towards the amphibious operations with the Pakistan Army, was commissioned in the Navy on 1 June 1971. Initially, the Marines were modeled based on the British Royal Marines and were aimed towards conducting independent expeditionary and amphibious operations in a geographical region that was essentially a dead-level plain, which made it difficult for the Pakistan Army to conduct mechanized operations, though an ideal theatre for amphibious ground forces.

The Marines were initially tasked to counter the Indian Army in Chittagong and Khulna with only four patrol boat and improvised imported amphibious vehicles. Due to lack of training and vessels, misunderstanding of the amphibious terrains, operational capabilities, the Marines failed to produce any significant results to counter the insurgency that resulted in their decommissioning in 1974.

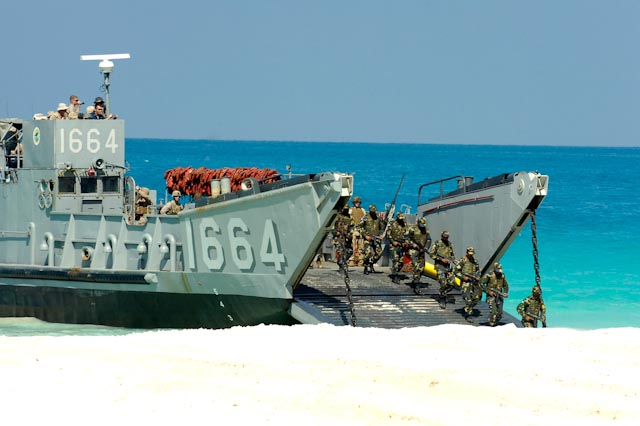
The battalion of Pakistan Marines landing and ashore off a landing craft utility during a training exercise in support of Operation Bright Star.

Nonetheless, the Marines continued to exists in its rudimentary form until 1988 to meet the fundamental security requirements of Pakistan Navy offshore establishments in the country. Following the introduction of the Mistral weapon system in the Navy, the Marines were re-commissioned under Cdr. Obaidulla (PN. Service number 1558) with Manora Fort at the vicinity of the PNS Qasim serving its first forward base on 14 April 1990.

Per Navy's request, the Pakistan Army undertook the training of the new Marines personnel at the Pakistan Military Academy in Kakul and later at the School of Infantry and Tactics in Quetta, aiming to raise an infantry unit to guard the offshore establishments of the Navy.

Initially, the Marines objectives were to provide security and cover to the offshore establishments of the Navy while aiding the federal government using the Navy's mobility. Headquarters of the Marines was relocated from the PNS Himalaya (Navy's only boot camp) to the Manora Fort in the PNS Qasim that was renamed as Marine Base Qasim in 1994. The commissioning Marines consisted of eighty commissioned officers, sixty seven chief petty officers from general service and forty three Marines. Its first battalion was activated in September 1971.

As part of the first combat assignment, the Marines were deployed at the Sir Creek region during the last decade, threat on the South-Eastern border increased manifolds, warranting an immediate response.

Estimating the type and quantum of threat, the Pakistan Navy proposed deployment of a sizable force in the Sir Creeks region. The then-Rear Admiral Shahid Karimullah vigorously pursued the case of an additional battalion and its phase-wise development plan. Since its inception, Creeks Battalion is deployed in its designated Area of Responsibility.

On 28 March 2013, Pakistan Navy commissioned the third battalion of Pakistan Marines in order to further strengthen the defense of the Gwadar Port and to enhance the security of vital Pakistan Navy assets and installations along the western coasts of Pakistan.

== Training center ==
Marine Training center is situated in Gwadar, Balochistan. Before Gwadar it was situated in PNS Qasim Manora Island Karachi but recently, shifted to Gwadar.

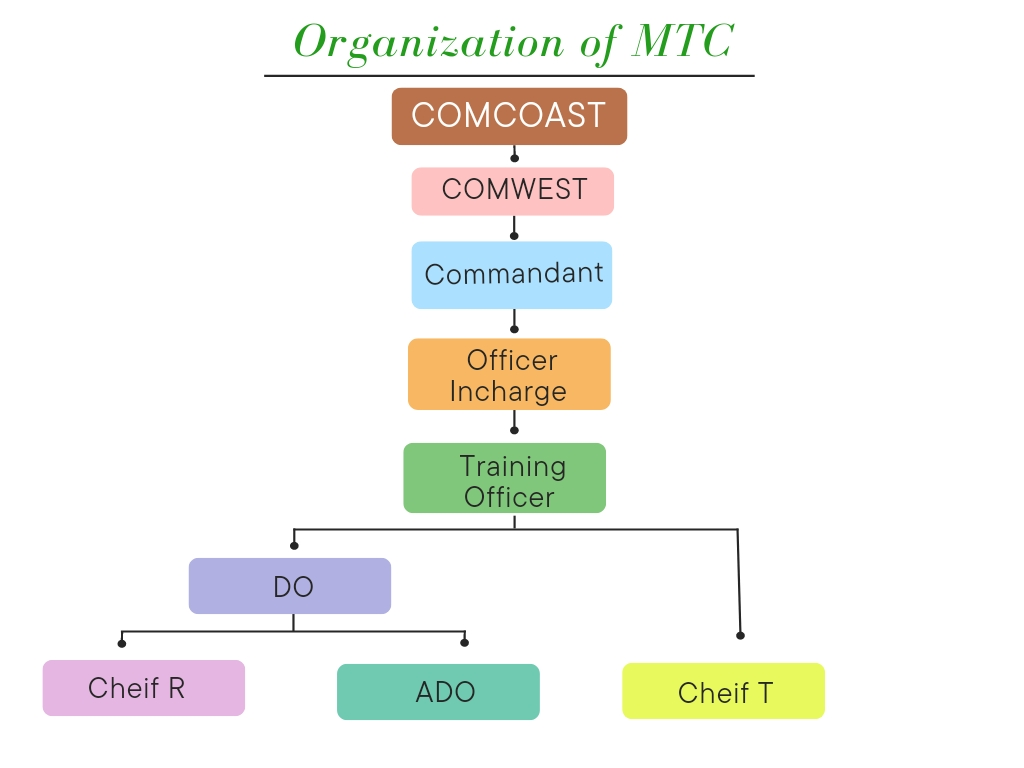
Pakistan Marine Training center

Marines Training Centre (MTC) conducts all levels of training for Marines. Additionally, it also conducts courses for the Pak Marines officers and allied countries. Marine Training Centre was established in 1990 in PNS Himalaya to impart Basic and Advance training to Pak Marines. Over a short period of time it has achieved excellence in imparting high standard of professional training to Marines. It is now fully capable of making a Marine proficient in Amphibious Warfare, Riverine Operations and Shore-based air Defence. Centre also conducts the basic and refresher training for PNP(Pakistan Naval Police).

MTC has achieved proficiency in imparting high standard of professional training. Consequently, it has been assigned the responsibility of conducting basic training of Pakistan Naval Police personnel as well. In pursuit of professional excellence, the Marines besides carrying out exercises and workups locally also participate in international exercises both inland and abroad

== Organization ==
=== Marines Headquarters ===
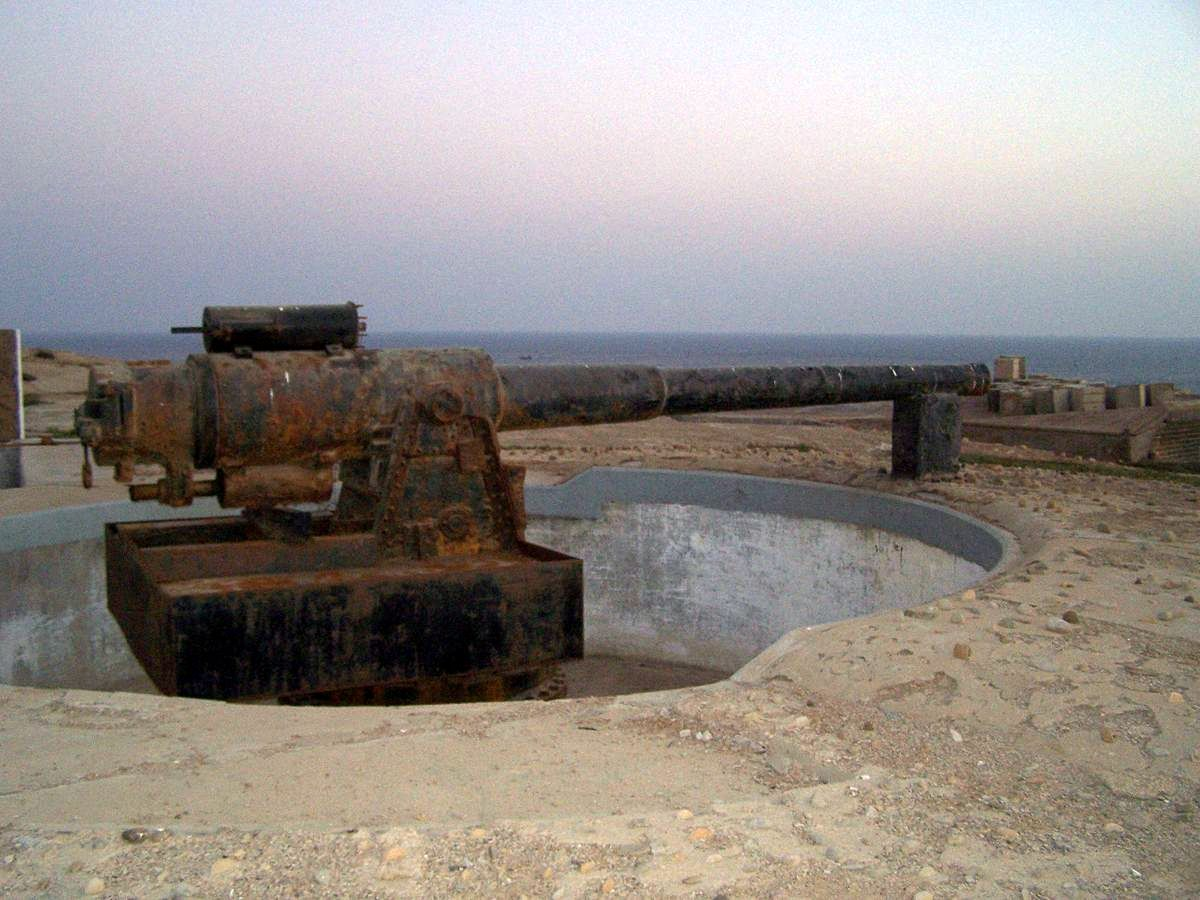
A vintage cannon in the Manora Fort installed by the Royal Marines during the World War II.

The headquarters of the marines were initially set up in the Naval Base Dacca in East Pakistan in 1971 but relocated in the Karachi after the third war with India. In 1990, the Marines were organized in PNS Himalaya initially, but the organizational command was relocated in Manora Fort located in the PNS Qasim that was renamed as Qasim Marine Base in 1995. General military administration and logistics for the Marines are operated from the Qasim Marine Base in Karachi.

The Marines maintains and control the inter-services liaison communication between the Army and the Marines from the Marine Base Qasim, overseeing the military training and instructions on the weapon system provided by the Army instructors and weapon system specialists.

=== Marines bases, camps, and battalions ===
The Pakistan Marines operations are primarily controlled from the Qasim Marine Base but are stationed in Joint Army-Marine Base Sir Creek, Army Base Ormara, Gwadar Marine Camp and Marine Base Punjab. Since 1998, the Army helped Navy to raise six infantry battalions (approximately ~800 personnel), commanded by an officer with rank of Commander.

Battalions	Garrison/Headquarters	Area of responsibility
1st Marines Battalion	NHQ	Pakistan Naval Complex
2nd Marines Battalion	PNS Qasim	Karachi district
3rd Marines Battalion	PNS Akram	Port of Gwadar
Marines Amphibious Wing	PNS Qasim	Karachi Coast
1st Creek Battalion	Sujawal District	Sir Creek / Keti Bandar / Shahbandar
21st Air Defense Battalion	Jinnah Naval Base / COMWEST	Gwadar District Coastal Areas
23rd Air Defence Battalion	Sujawal	Sir Creek / Kori

== Personnel ==
=== Leadership and training ===
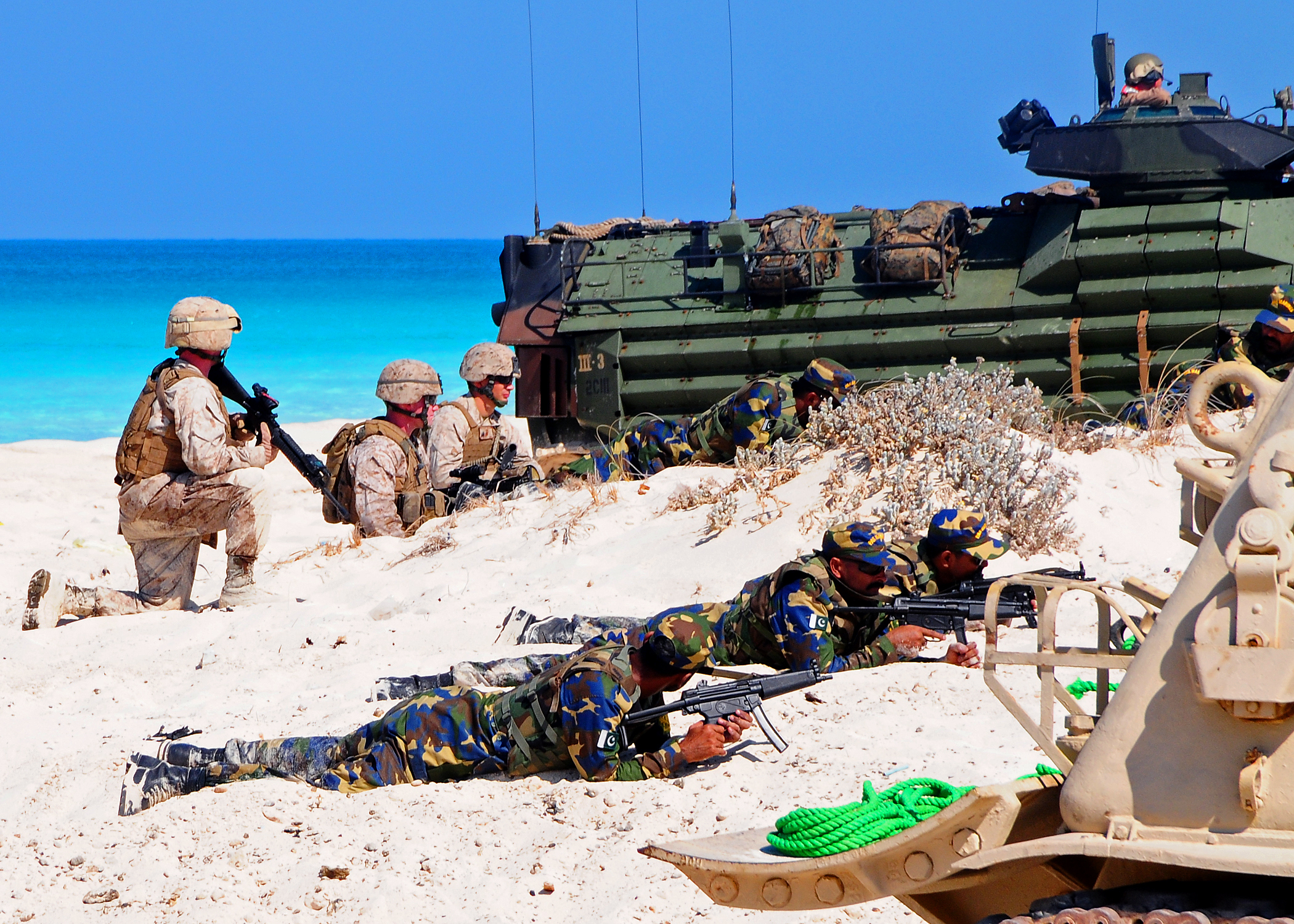
The Pakistan Marine unit members dressed in operational camouflage uniforms with their U.S. counterparts in 2009.

The Commander, Coastal Areas (COMCOAST), designated as the Chief of Staff Marines (CSM), is the highest-ranking officer in the Marines, usually at a rank of three-star, reporting directly to the Chief of Naval Staff.

The officer candidates are directed to attend the Pakistan Naval Academy in Karachi in order to gain commissioned in the Marines, where the candidates pass out in courses relating the military history and training, training for the soldier recruits are conducted at the PNS Himalaya– the initial entry training center ("boot camp") of the Navy. Following the award of their commissions, marines officers and personnel attend the Marine Training Center (MTC) located at the PNS Qasim to learn infantry and combined arms warfare, usually instructed by Pakistani Army specialists. At the MTC, the Marines completes the Basic Marines Course that included the instructions on comprehensive physical training in unarmed combat, close-quarter battle, security duties, swimming, small-arms handling and infantry tactics.

After passing the basic marine training course, the Marines are directed to attend the Pakistan Army's School of Infantry and Tactics in Quetta where they are trained together with army personnel. Since 1999, the Marines have been instructed to operate the Mistral missile system, ordnance, and special security courses to protect naval bases on coastal areas.

The Marines formations and personnel wears the camouflage uniforms when deployed to an operational environment but otherwise they wear Navy dress uniforms in public and international ceremonies.

=== Commissioned officers and Enlisted rank ===
The Marines are the branch within the Navy, therefore, using the same ranks and insignia as equivalent to the Pakistan Navy as contrary to the U.S. Marines in the United States and the Royal Marines in the United Kingdom.

Rank group	General/flag officers			Senior officers			Junior officers
Pakistan Marines
Pakistan Marines	Vice admiral	Rear admiral	Commodore	Captain	Commander	Lieutenant commander	Lieutenant	Sub-lieutenant	Midshipman

Rank group	Junior commissioned officers			Non commissioned officer		Enlisted
Pakistan Marines							No insignia
Pakistan Marines	Master Chief Petty Officer	Fleet Chief Petty Officer	Chief Petty Officer	Petty Officer	Leading Seaman	Able Tech-I	Ordinary Tech-II

== Honours and awards ==
=== Wartime Gallantry Awards ===
Nishan-e-Haider (Order of the Lion)
Hilal-e-Jurat (Crescent of Courage)
Sitara-e-Jurat (Star of Courage)
Tamgha-e-Jurat (Medal of Courage)
Imtiazi Sanad (Mentioned in Despatches)

Order of Wear
Nishan-e-Haider (Order of the Lion)	Nishan-e-Imtiaz (Civilian)	Nishan-e-Imtiaz (Military)	Hilal-e-Jurat (Crescent of Courage)
Hilal-e-Shujaat (Crescent of Bravery)	Hilal-e-Imtiaz (Civilian)	Hilal-e-Imtiaz (Military)	Sitara-e-Jurat (Star of Courage)
Sitara-e-Shujaat (Star of Bravery)	Sitara-e-Imtiaz (Military)	President's Award for Pride of Performance	Sitara-e-Basalat (Star of Good Conduct)
Sitara-e-Eisaar (Star of Sacrifice)	Tamgha-e-Jurat (Medal of Courage)	Tamgha-e-Shujaat (Medal of Bravery)	Tamgha-e-Imtiaz (Military)
Tamgha-e-Basalat (Medal of Good Conduct)	Tamgha-e-Eisaar (Medal of Sacrifice)	Imtiazi Sanad (Mentioned in Despatches)	Tamgha-e-Diffa (General Service Medal)
Sitara-e-Harb 1965 War (War Star 1965)	Sitara-e-Harb 1971 War (War Star 1971)	Tamgha-e-Jang 1965 War (War Medal 1965)	Tamgha-e-Jang 1971 War (War Medal 1971)
Tamgha-e-Baqa (Nuclear Test Medal)	Tamgha-e-Istaqlal Pakistan (Escalation with India Medal)	Tamgha-e-Azm (Medal of Conviction)	Tamgha-e-Khidmat (Class-I) (Medal of Service Class I)
Tamgha-e-Khidmat (Class-II) (Medal of Service Class I)	Tamgha-e-Khidmat (Class-III) (Medal of Service Class I)	10 Years Service Medal	20 Years Service Medal
30 Years Service Medal	35 Years Service Medal	40 Years Service Medal	Pakistan Tamgha (Pakistan Medal)
Tamgha-e-Sad Saala Jashan-e- Wiladat-e-Quaid-e-Azam	Tamgha-e-Jamhuria (Republic Commemoration Medal)	Hijri Tamgha (Hijri Medal)	Jamhuriat Tamgha (Democracy Medal)
Qarardad-e-Pakistan Tamgha (Resolution Day Golden Jubilee Medal)	Tamgha-e-Salgirah Pakistan (Independence Day Golden Jubilee Medal)	Command & Staff College Quetta Instructor's Medal	Command & Staff College Quetta Student Medal

== Photo gallery ==
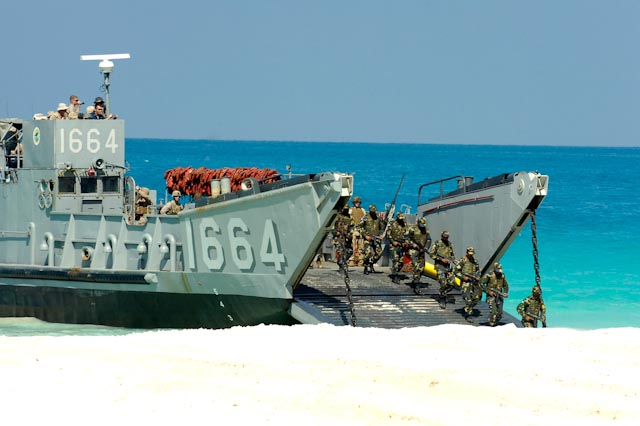
The Pakistan Marines in parallel steps march down the beach from a landing craft utility during the Bright Star in Alexandria in Egypt in 2009.

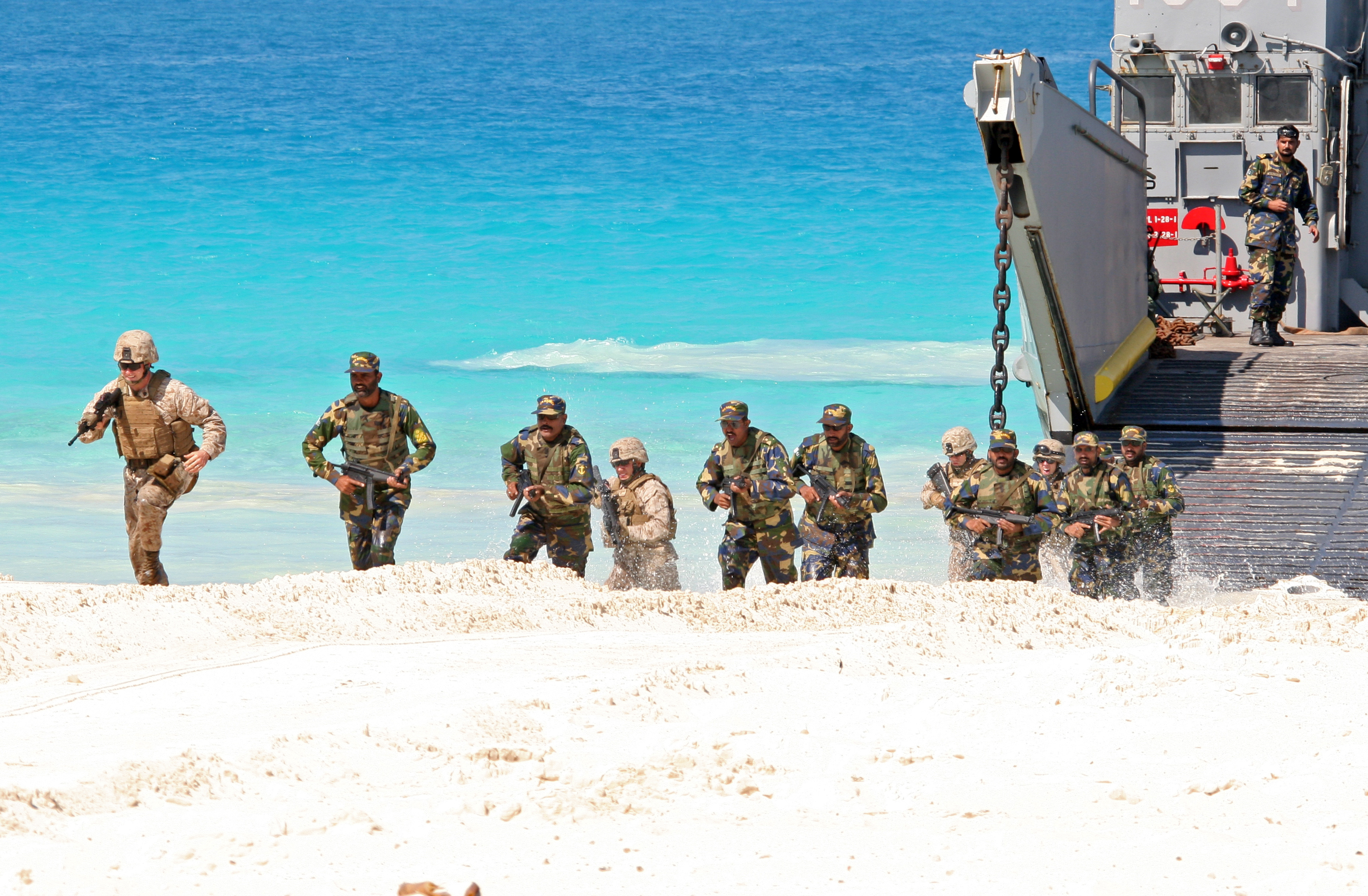
The U.S. Marines's 22nd Marine Expeditionary Unit alongside the Pakistan Marines demonstrating an amphibious assault from a landing craft utility during the Bright Star in Alexandria in Egypt in 2009.

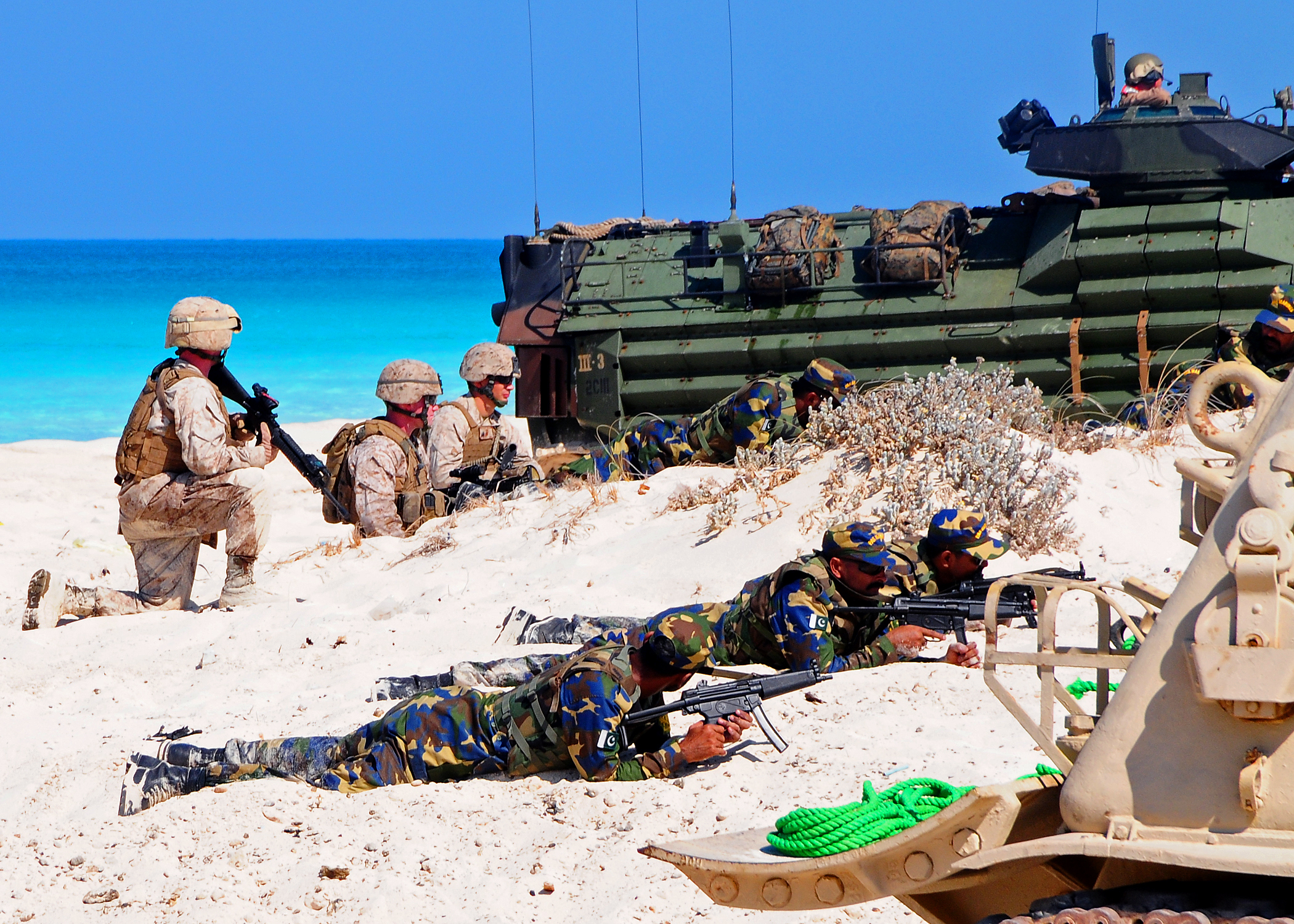
Pakistan Marines (in Blue camouflage uniform) observing forward with the U.S. Marines in Alexandria in Egypt in 2009.

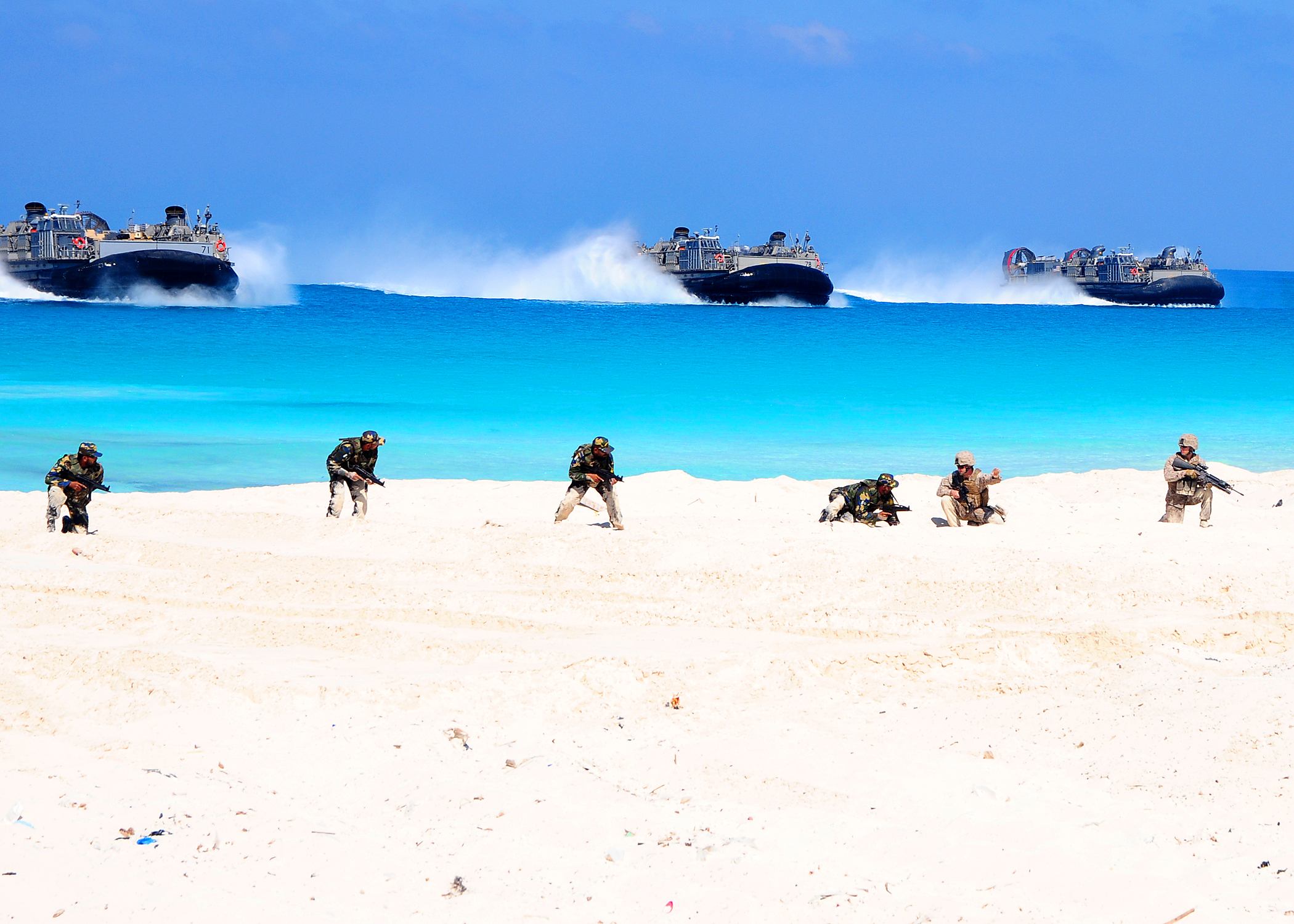
The Pakistan Marines receiving standing orders from the 22nd Marine Expeditionary Unit during the exercise, Bright Star, conducted in Alexandria in Egypt in 2009.

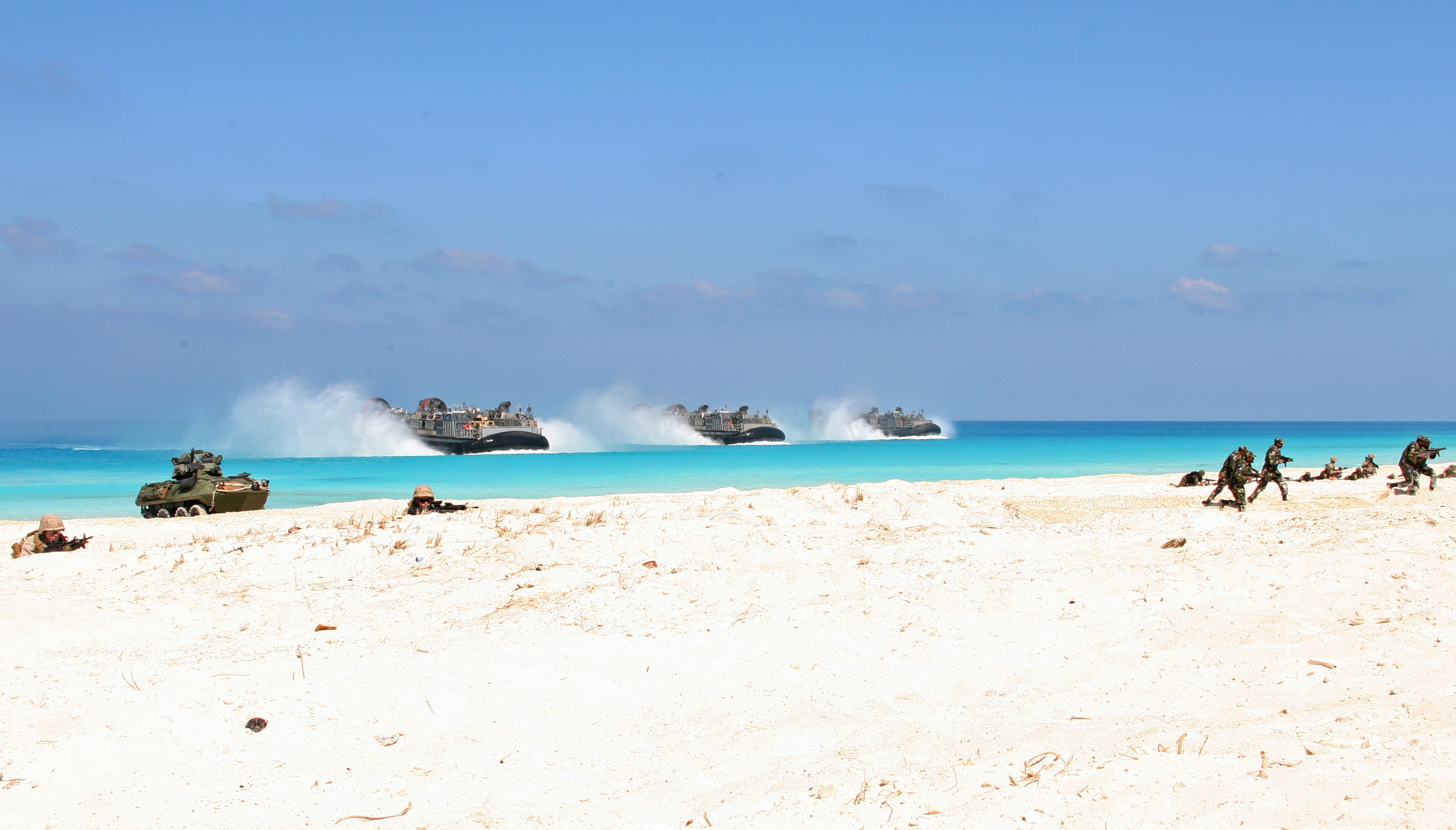
Pakistan Marines conducting an amphibious assault in Alexandria in Egypt in 2009.

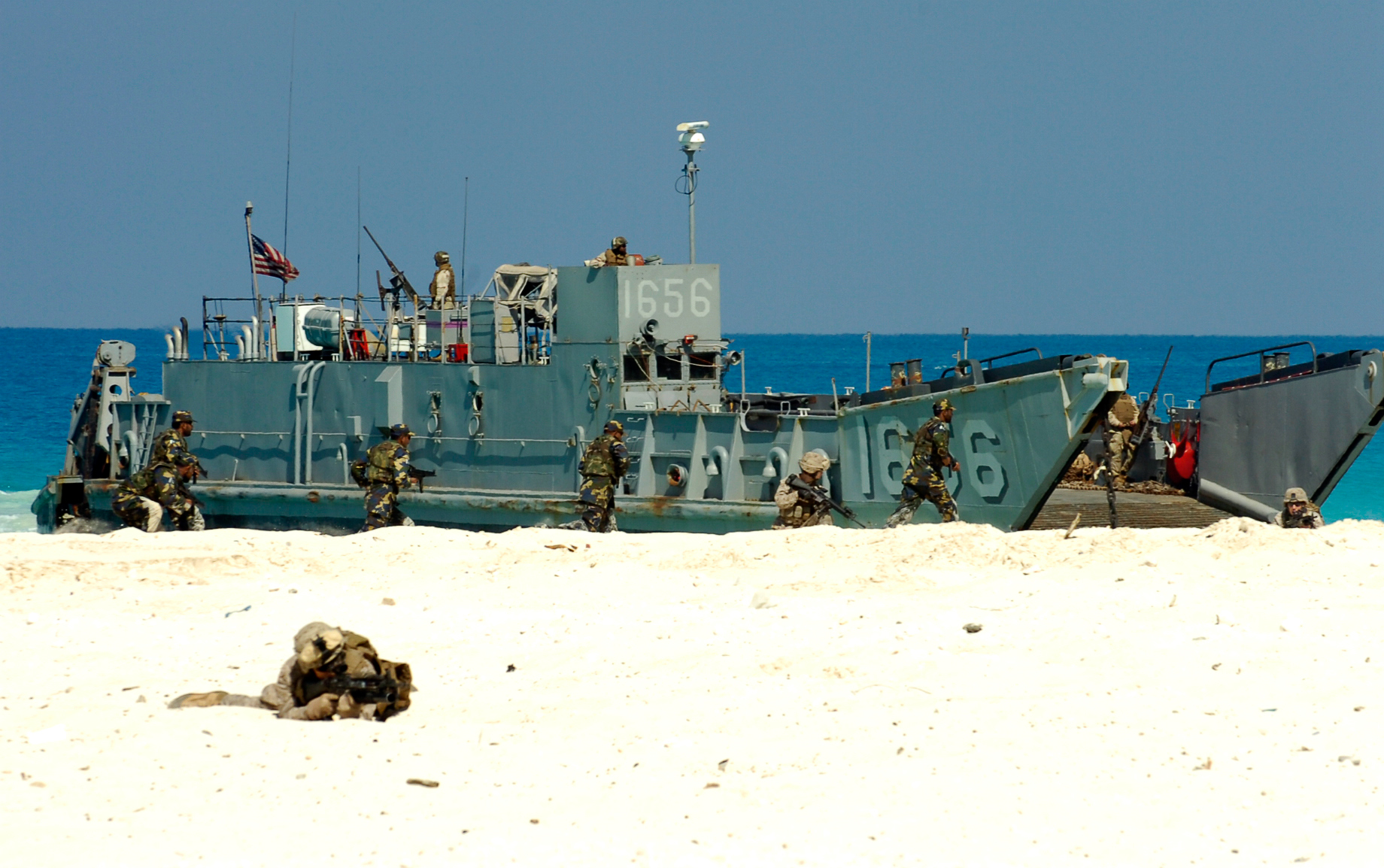
Pakistan Marines and U.S. Marines from Battalion Landing Teams take up firing positions after exiting a landing craft utility and provide security for landing forces during a training exercise in support of Bright Star in Alexandria in Egypt in 2009.

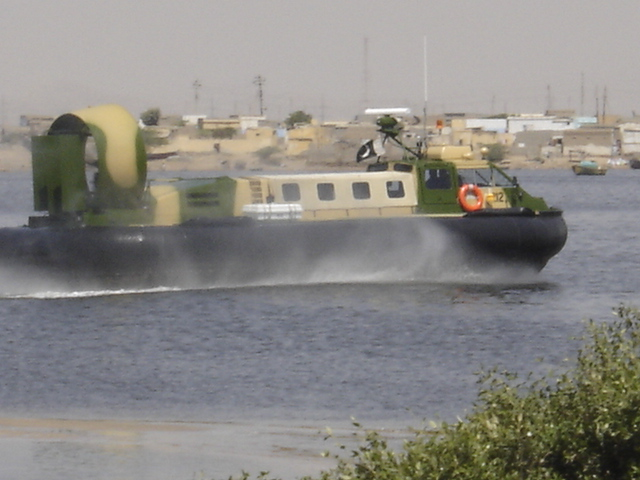
A Pakistan Marines operated Griffon 2000TD hovercraft patrolling off the Karachi Nuclear Power Plant at the Paradise Point in Pakistan in 2006.
