= Logistics Command =

Logistical support and supply branch of the Pakistan Navy

- Country: Pakistan
- Branch: Pakistan Navy
- Type: Logistics force
- Role: Logistics; engineering; shipbuilding
- Headquarters: Karachi, Pakistan

The Pakistan Navy Logistics Command is one of the six principal commands-in-field of the Pakistan Navy, operating under the authority of the Commander Logistics (COMLOG), a role held by a flag officer.

== See also ==
- Military installations in Karachi
