= Karachiya =

- Census town
- Location in Gujarat, India Karachiya (India)
- Coordinates: 22.52846°N 73.25745°E
- Country: India
- State: Gujarat
- District: Vadodara

Population (2001)
  - Total: 7,732

Languages
  - Official: Gujarati, Hindi
- Time zone: UTC+5:30 (IST)
- Vehicle registration: GJ
- Website: gujaratindia.com

Karachiya is a census town in Vadodara district in the Indian state of Gujarat.

== Demographics ==
As of 2001 India census, Karachiya had a population of 7732. Males constitute 56% of the population and females 44%. Karachiya has an average literacy rate of 72%, higher than the national average of 59.5%: male literacy is 80%, and female literacy is 61%. In Karachiya, 12% of the population is under 6 years of age.
