= Kratié =

Kratié (also transliterated Kracheh) may refer to:

- Kratié (town), a town in Kratié Commune, Cambodia
- Kratié Commune, a commune in Kratié District, Cambodia
- Kratié District, a district in Kratié Province, Cambodia
- Kratié Province, a province in Cambodia
