= PNS Qasim =

Pakistan Navy's base for marine logistics

Coordinates: 24°47′24″N 66°58′47″E

- Badge of PMS Qasim
- Active: 1990; 36 years ago
- Country: Pakistan
- Branch: Pakistan Navy
- Type: Naval Base
- Garrison/HQ: Manora Island, Sindh, Pakistan
- Nickname: QASIM

The Pakistan Navy Station Qasim (reporting name: PNS Qasim) is a naval base located in Manora Island, off the Karachi coast in Sindh, Pakistan.

While serving as a military logistics base for the Pakistan Marines, PNS Qasim also provides initial military training to Pakistan Marines, a maritime land warfare branch of the Pakistan Navy. The base is named after the Arab general Muhammad bin Qasim who conquered Daybul and the coastal areas of Sindh around 712 CE.

== History ==
On 14 April 1990, the Pakistan Navy re-formed and re-commissioned its land-based maritime fighting unit as Pakistan Marines to address and provide a coastal defense by headquartering it Fort Manora in Manora Island, off the Karachi coast. Originally, the Marines were formed in 1971 to provide a company strength unit to the Eastern Command based in former East-Pakistan. Initially started in PNS Dhaka, it was roughly modeled on the British Royal Marines and mandate to conduct the riverine and amphibious military operations but lost its prominence in 1974.

Addressing the need for coastal defense, the 1st Marines Battalion were formed by the Navy in PNS Himalaya and later Navy moved the Marines permanently in PNS Qasim in Manora Island on 25 November 1990.

== Organizations ==
=== Marines Training Centre ===
The Marines Training Centre (MTC) is an initial military training school to provide basic and advanced training for the Pakistan Marines. The Marines Training Centre was established in 1990 with the Pakistan Army's instructors were the first faculty to serve on. Since 2000, the navy has been running the training operations though the army's instructors still continue to provide advanced instruction as faculty members.

Since 1998, the Marines Training Centre also serves as the headquarters of the Naval Police, and conducts basic and refresher training for navy's military police units.
