= Qarachi (disambiguation) =

Qarachi is a noble title in the Turkic khanates of the 14–16th centuries.

Qarachi or Qaraçı may also refer to:

- Qaraçı, the Azerbaijani name of the Garachi group of Romani people
- Qaraçı, Azerbaijan, a village in the Khachmaz Rayon of Azerbaijan

== See also ==
- Karachi, the largest city in Pakistan
