= Manora Cantonment =

Military cantonment in Karachi, Pakistan

Coordinates: 24°57′N 67°13′E

Manora Cantonment منوڑا کنٹونمنٹ
- Cantonment
- Interactive map of Manora Cantonment
- Country: Pakistan
- Province: Sindh
- City: Karachi
- Website: www.cbmanora.gov.pk

The Manora Cantonment (Urdu: منوڑہ چھاؤنی) is a cantonment town in a small Manora Island, located just south of Karachi, in Sindh, Pakistan. It serves as a military base and residential establishment. Established by the British Indian Army in 19th-century British India, the cantonment was taken over by the Pakistan Army upon the country's independence in 1947.

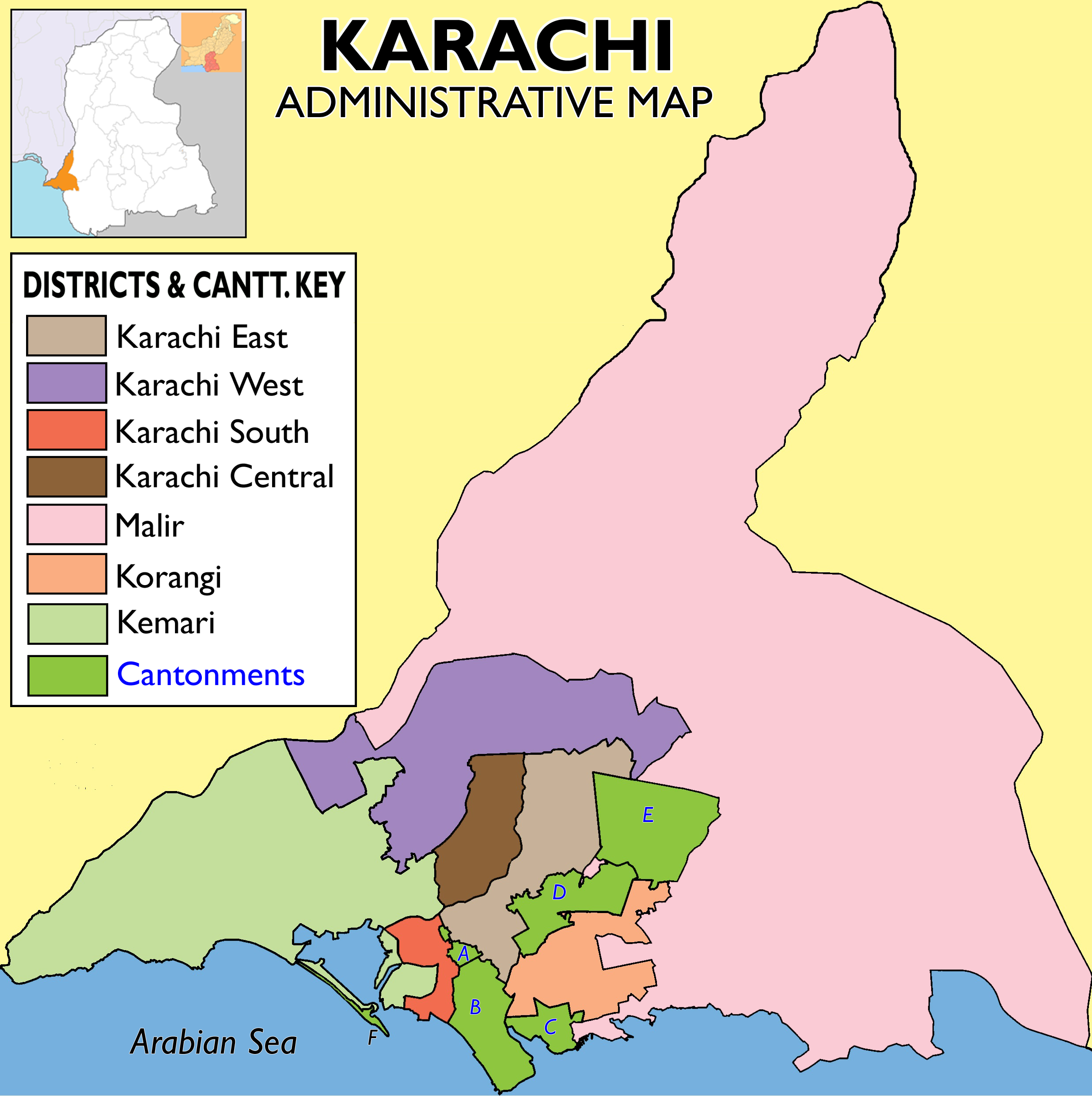
Location of Manora Cantt. marked 'F' in the administrative map of Karachi.

The cantonment maintains its own infrastructure of water supply, electricity and is outside the jurisdiction of City District Government of Karachi.

== See also ==
- Army Cantonment Board, Pakistan
- Cantonment (Pakistan)
- Manora, Karachi
- Manora Island
- Manora Fort, Karachi
