= PNS Karsaz =

Pakistan Navy's training formation on technical and physical training

PNS KARSAZ
- Badge of the PNS Karsaz
- Active: 24 September 1954 – present (71 years, 3 months)
- Country: Pakistan
- Branch: Pakistan Navy
- Type: Training formation
- Nickname: KARSAZ
- Website: pns karsaz

The Pakistan Navy Station Karsaz (reporting name: PNS Karsaz) is an initial military school of the Pakistan Navy that provides training to its sailors to be commissioned in the operations branch. It is the largest training formation of the Pakistan Navy that is focused towards providing the skilled technical and physical training.

It is located in the neighborhood of Karsaz in Karachi that provides skilled education on the subjects of the mechanics and the electronics for the Navy's enlisted personnel upon their passing out from the PNS Himalaya— the Navy's only basic training boot camp in Manora Island in Karachi coast, Sindh in Pakistan.

The PNS Karsaz serves to its purpose of conducting the instructional basis vocational education that ranges from the basic–to-mid–to–advance level professional courses on mechanics and military electronics for its Operations Branch. Established with the assistance from the U.S. Navy in 1954, the training and technical education does not restrict to the Navy's enlisted personnel but the enlisted personnel from the Army and the Air Force have been educated, certified, and earned their badges of qualifications from the PNS Karsaz.

Besides providing career training to the Pakistani military's enlisted personnel, the PNS Karsaz has provided crucial training to the allied nations and enlisted members from the navies of Bangladesh, Jordan, Maldives, Oman, Saudi Arabia, and Sri Lanka.

== History ==
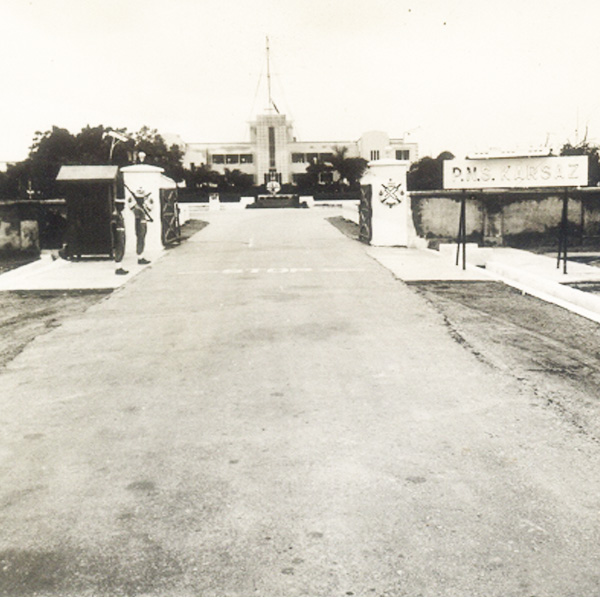
The entrance to the PNS Karsaz, ca. 1954.

After the partition of India that established the independence of Pakistan from the United Kingdom, the Royal Indian Navy (RIN) was divided between the navies of India and Pakistan, with Pakistan only receiving the one-third of the personnel from the Royal Indian Navy.

At the time of the commencement of the Navy, there was no training formation or a naval station that would ensure the training and education of the new prospective trainee to oversee the functionality of the war machinery in the Navy as India had objected transferring of all the machinery and training establishments that happens to be on Indian soil to Pakistan. The Navy then established two schools that focused on the technical education — Pakistan Navy Polytechnic Institute (PNPI) in 1951 and the PNS Karsaz in 1954.

Establishment of the PNS Karsaz lies with the contribution and the crucial assistance from the United States Navy on 24 September 1954 with Rear-Admiral Zahid Hasnain becoming its first commandant. From 1954 until the late 1960s, the U.S. Navy officers served in the faculty of the PNS Karsaz, with initial courses offered on basic mechanics and machinery in 1954 and later adding instructions on electronics in 1955 with a Damage Control and Firefighting School being established for this purpose.

For meeting the technical training needs in mechanical machinery and electronics, the PNS Karsaz has multidimensional responsibilities by providing education and instructions on machinery maintenance and electrical and circuitry systems in the machines.

== Campus ==
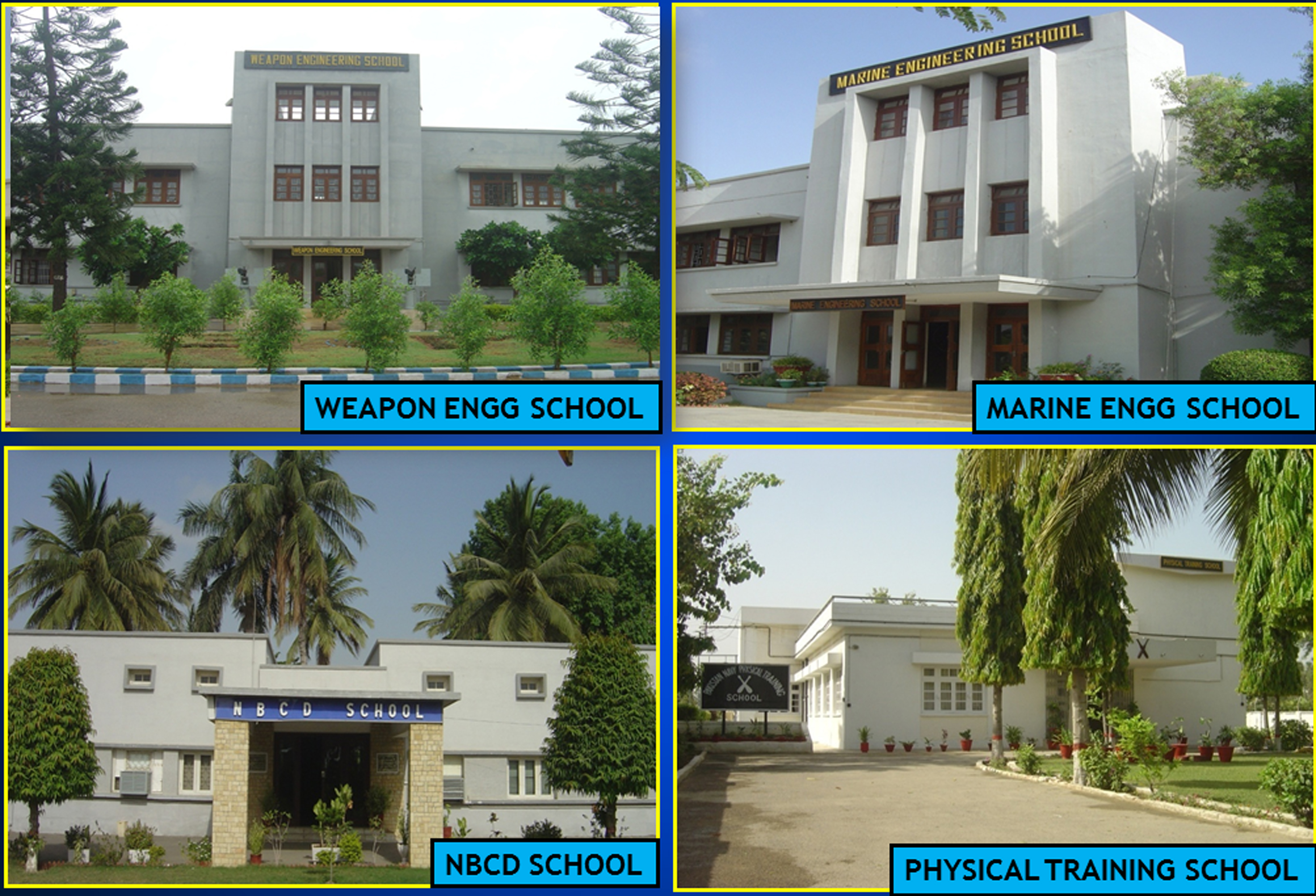
The PNS Karsaz hosts four schools: Marine Engineering, Weapon Engineering, NBCD, and Physical Training School.

The PNS Karsaz is a well established and a largest complex of covering the 45.5 acres (1,980,000 sq ft) that consists of a single administration building and four vocation schools including the auditorium, library on military history, gym, and dormitory that houses its personnel. The Karsaz campus hosts namely four schools:

  - Marine Engineering School
  - Weapon Engineering School
  - NBCD School
  - Physical Training School

Each school is headed by an appointed officer-in-charge who is assisted by the respective faculties. The objectives of the each school is carry out the training needs analysis continuously as per the requirement of Navy.

=== Weapon Engineering School ===
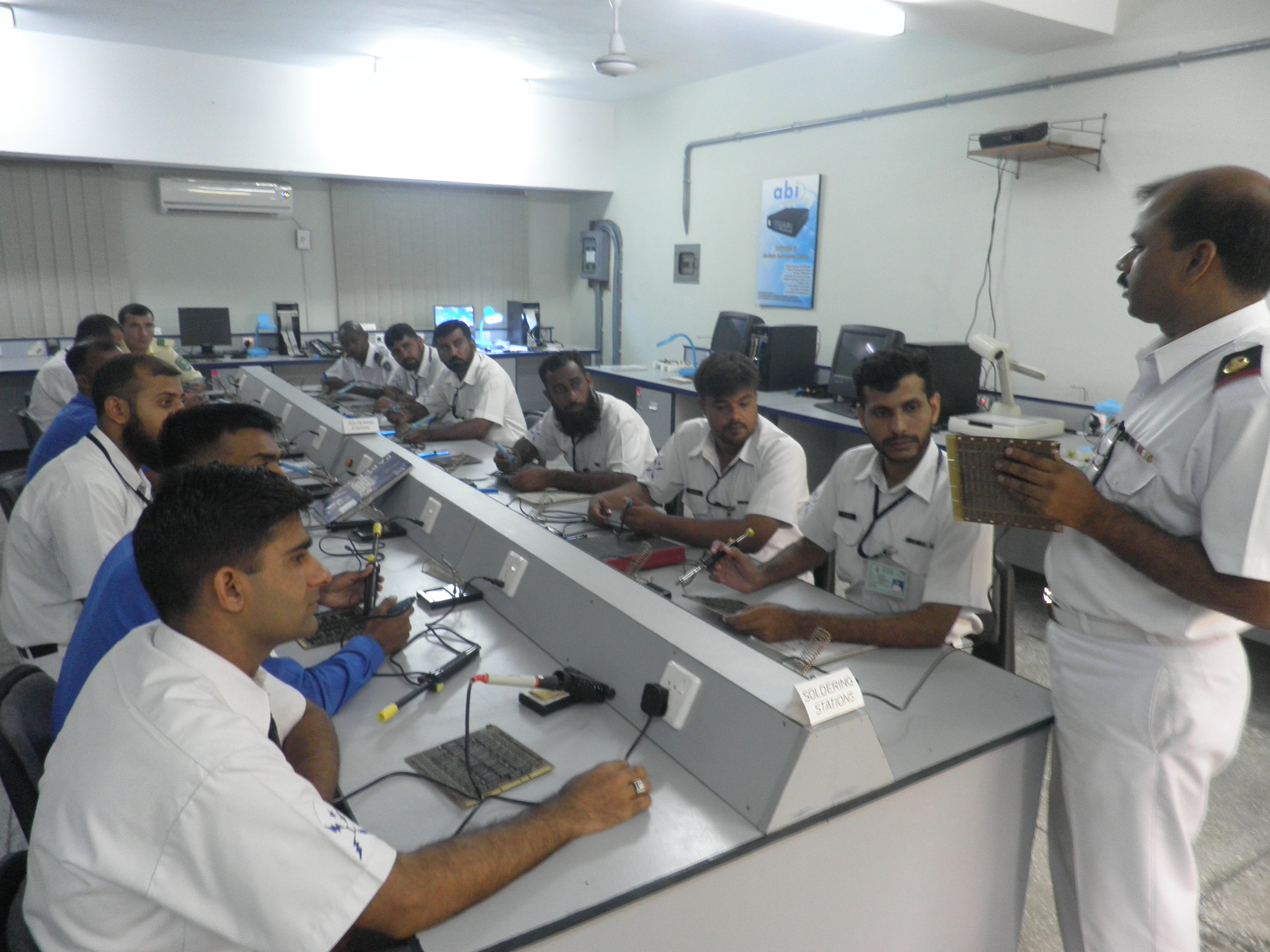
The enlisted personnel are repairing the PCB at the PCB Diagnosis & Repair lab's in Weapon Engineering School.

The Weapon Engineering School (WES) is a vocational training school that provides instructions and certifications on maintenance and repairs of the shipborne communication equipments, military computer system, sensors, and the shipborne weapon systems to the enlisted personnels of the navy.

To ensure the effective combat readiness, the Weapon Engineering School has twenty-one laboratories and simulators to give practical experiences to the trainees for fault diagnosing and troubleshooting.

The Weapon Engineering School is restricted to the military personnel with only navy and army personnel who are required to attend, graduate and certified with their pins from the Weapon Engineering School before reporting to their respected service branch's units.

=== Marine Engineering School ===
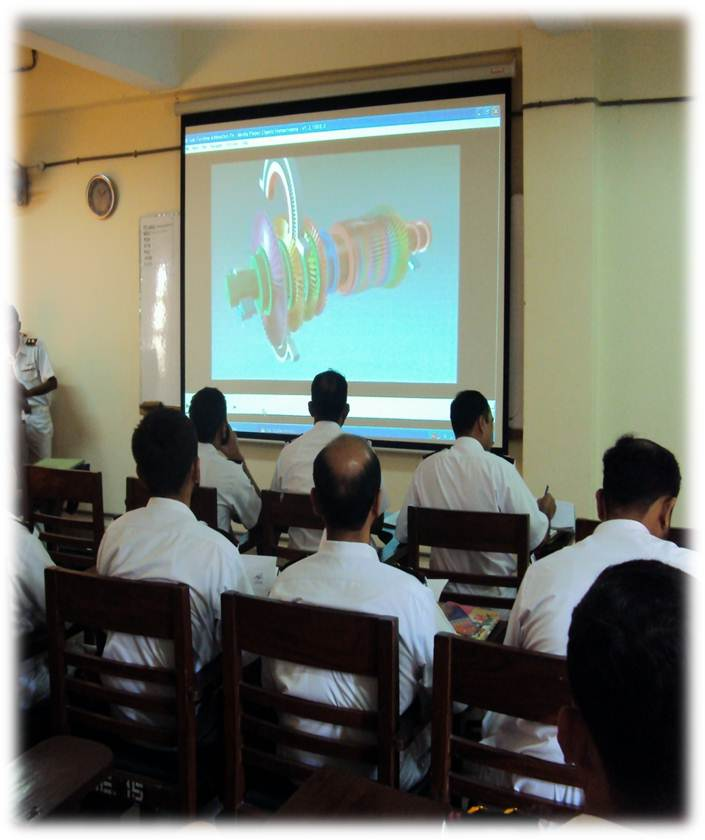
The lecture and instructions given on the turbomachinery at the Marine Engineering School at PNS Karsaz.

The Marine Engineering School (MES) provides training, instructions, and certifications to operate and maintain the turbomachinery, engines, turbines fitted on the warships. The Marine Engineering School is a vocational training school that provides practical instructions on mechanical and electrical engineering disciplines to ensure that the enlisted personnel are qualified and certified on the maintenance and repairs of all electrical and mechanical machinery fitted on the navy's vessels, aircraft, and offshore units.

The Marine Engineering School operates eight laboratories, multiple workshops and machine shops to ensure training and certifications of the enlisted personnel for turning, milling, metal forming, grinding, shaping and cutting.

The Marine Engineering School is not restricted to the navy but the personnel and the civilians from the Pakistan Merchant Navy and the National Shipping Corporation (PNSC) are required to attend and graduate with their certifications from the Marine Engineering School.

=== NBCD School ===
The NBCD School is mandated with providing instructions, training, and the certifications on damage control and firefighting methods. The instructions and certifications on performing the first aid and the procedures on administrating the naval medicines are also part of the NBCD School's curriculum.

Similarly with the Marine Engineering School, the NBCD School is not restricted to the navy but the personnel and civilians from the Merchant Navy and the Pakistan National Shipping Corporation (PNSC) are required to attend and graduate with their certifications from the NBCD School.

Together with the Marine Engineering School (MES), the NBCD School has educated and certified personnel from the navies of the Bangladesh, Jordan, Oman, Maldives, Nigeria, Saudi Arabia, Sri Lanka, Turkmenistan, and Turkey.

=== Physical Training School ===
The Physical Training School (PTS) is responsible and mandated for providing and ensuring the physical fitness and physical training of the enlisted personnel of the navy. The physical training instructions (PTI) courses and certifications are only restricted to the navy's personnel and ensure that the military fitness and competence is effective for the navy's enlisted personnel to perform the duties in warships and other deployments.

== Gallery ==
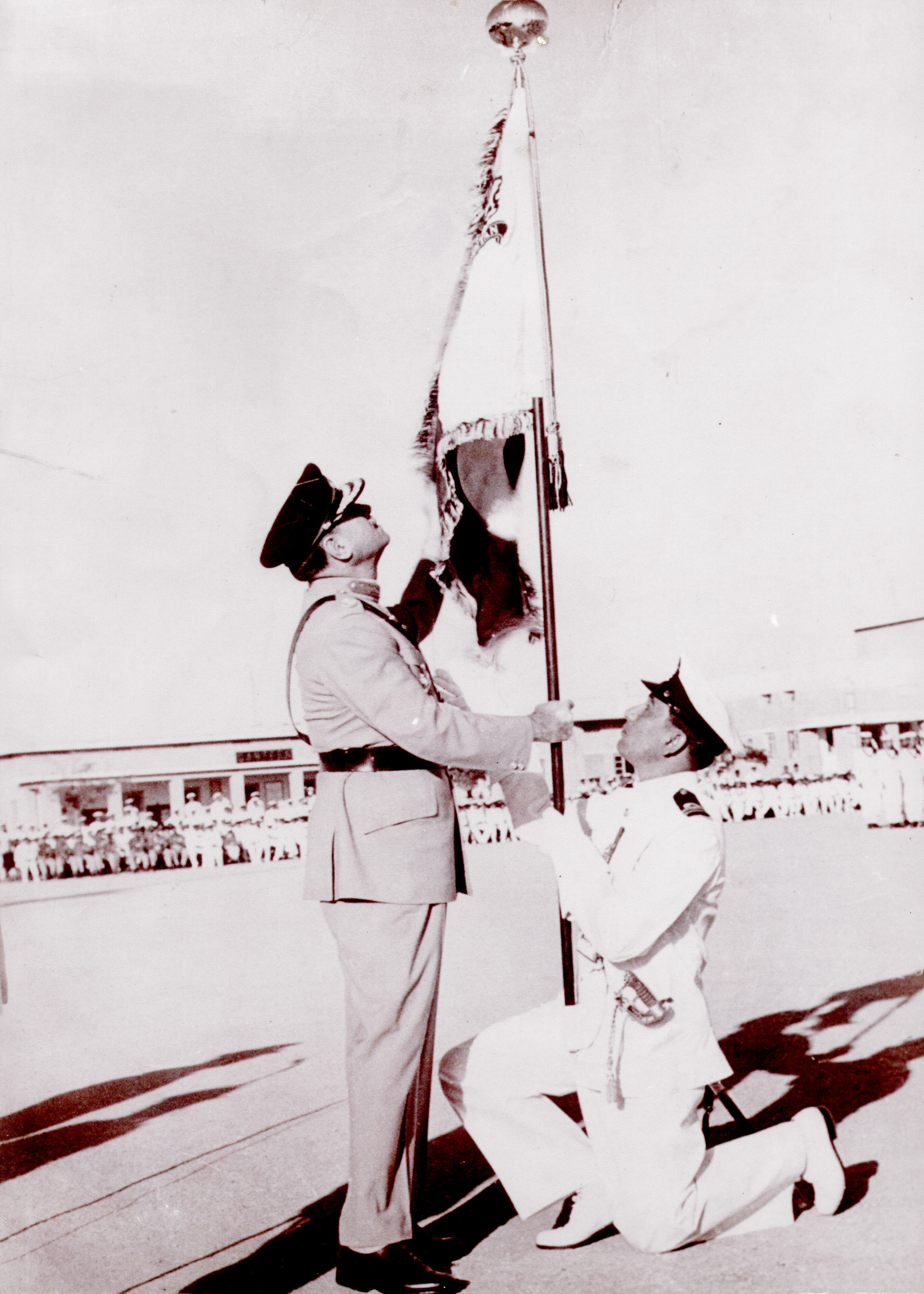
Gen. Ayub Khan, then-army chief and Defense Minister, hoisting the flag when Karsaz was established, ca. 1954.

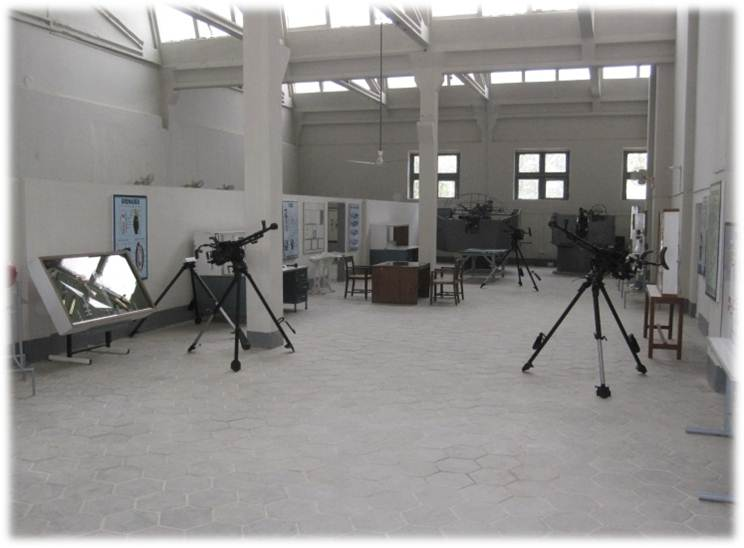
The Weapon Engineering School (WES)'s Ordnance Workshop with Russian DShK caliber.

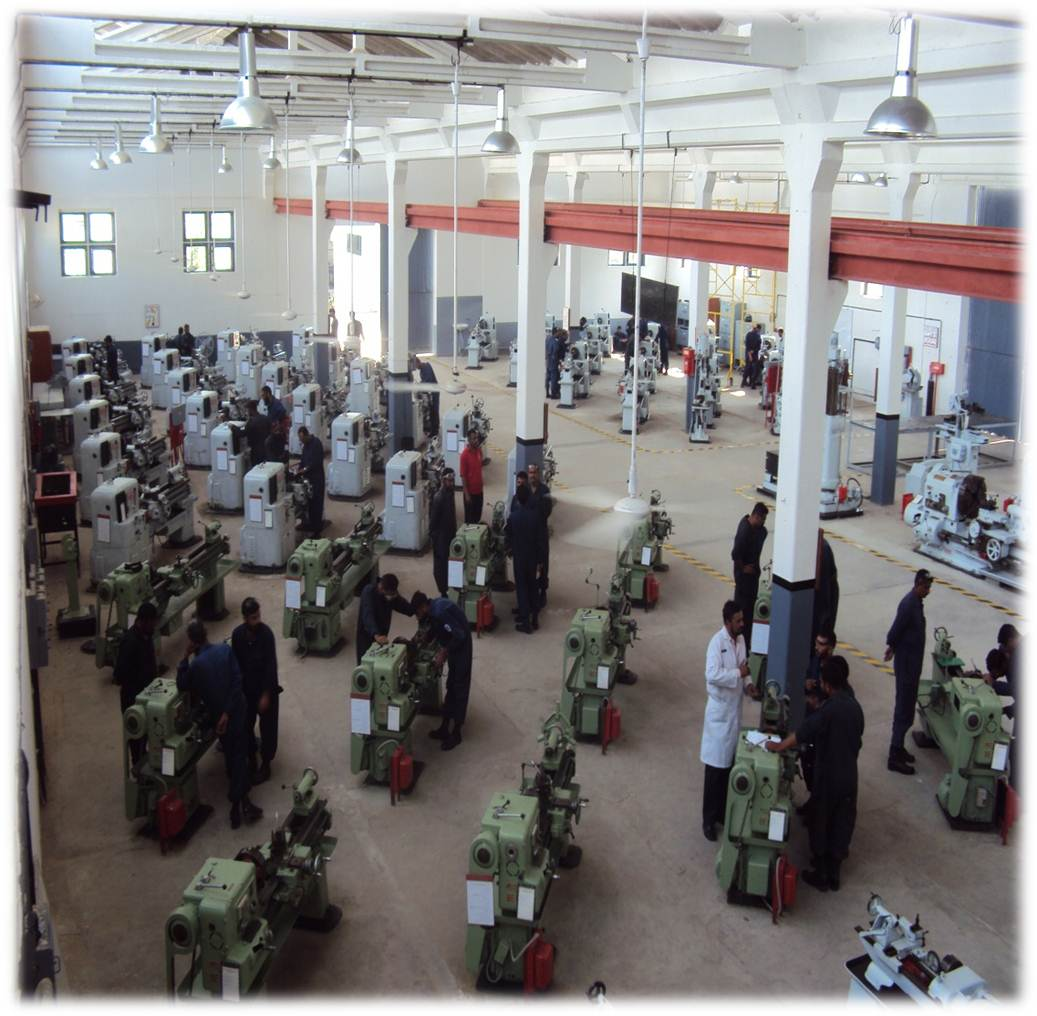
The Marine Engineering School's Machine Shop at the PNS Karsaz.

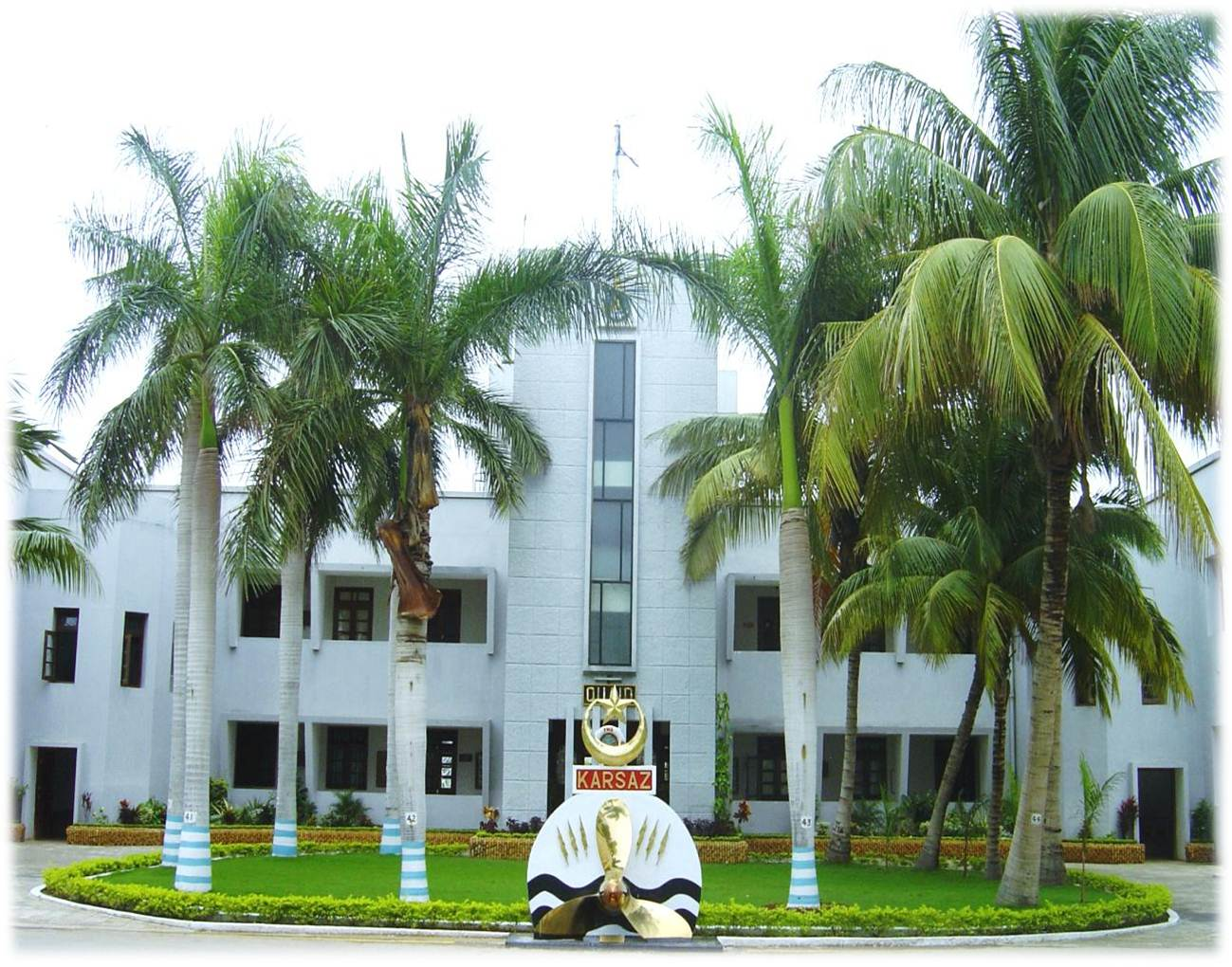
The Jinnah Block campus building at the PNS Karsaz.

== See also ==
- Pakistan Navy
