= Faisal Cantonment =

Faisal
- Cantonment
- Country: Pakistan
- Province: Sindh
- City District: Karachi
- Established: 4 November 1925

Government
  - Type: Cantonment Board
  - Body: Cantonment Board Faisal

Population (2017)
  - Total: 292,196
- Postal code: 74350
- Website: cbfaisal.gov.pk

The Faisal Cantonment (Urdu: فیصل چھاؤنی) previously known as Drigh Road Cantonment is a cantonment town of the city of Karachi, in Sindh, Pakistan. It serves as a Pakistan Air Force base and residential establishment.

== History ==
The PAF Base, a critical British Royal Air Force Base, was set up in 1925. The Drigh Road Cantonment, meant for civilians, was also founded nearby that same year, as stated in the Government of Bombay Revenue Department Notification No.4840/24 dated November 4, 1925. In 1947, it was renamed Faisal Cantonment. The boundaries of the Cantonment Board changed twice, once in 1988 and again in 1995. The Board earned a Class I classification in 2002 and, according to the 2017 census, it has a population of 292,196.

The area is not just home to the first airfield established by the Royal Air Force in the sub-continent, it also reflects a small-scale version of Pakistan. The population is a diverse blend from all provinces, including descendants of the initial settlers (mohajirs) who arrived after independence in 1947.

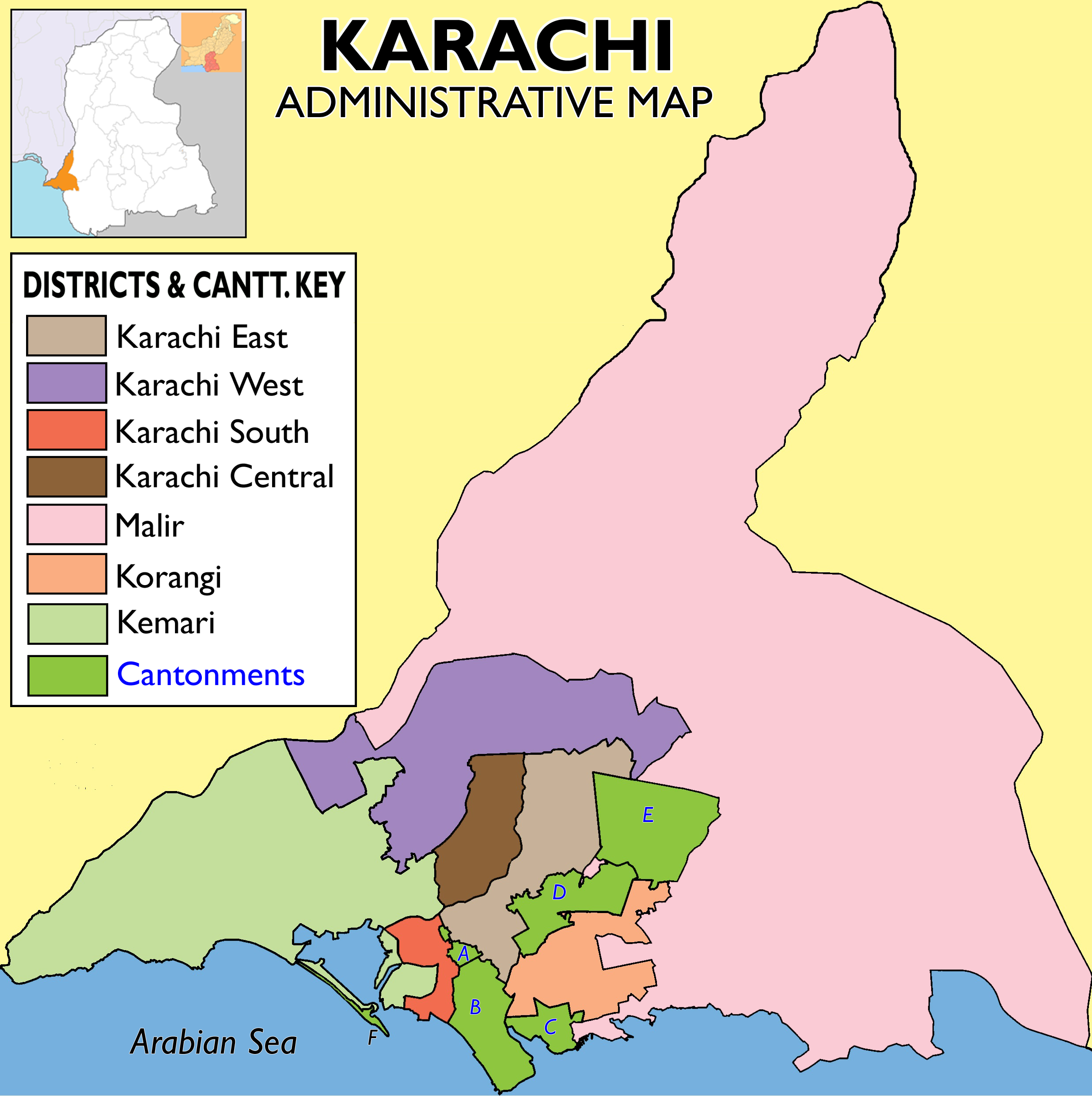
Location of Faisal Cantt. marked 'D' in the administrative map of Karachi.

== Working Departments ==
- CEO Office
- PA TO CEO
- Assistant Secretary
- Office Superintendent
- Engineering Branch
- Building Control Cell
- Electric Branch
- Water Supply Branch
- Revenue Branch
- Workshop Branch
- Legal Branch
- Land Branch
- Account Branch
- Establishment Branch
- CB Care Center
- Sanitation Branch
- Horticulture Branch
- Sponsorship Branch
- IT Branch
- Store Branch

== Neighborhoods ==
- Haidri Goth
- Malir Halt
- Massan Ghat
- Millat Colony
- Pak Sadat Colony
- Rehmanabad Housing Project
- Sindh Baloch Co-operative Housing Society

== Areas ==
- Defence Officers Housing Authority
- Gulshan-e-Amna
- Gulshan-e-Jamal
- Askari-IV
- KDA Officers Co-operative Housing Society
- KDA Scheme-1/A(Extension)
- Khosa Goth
- Old Iqbalabad
- T and T Colony

=== Gulistan-e-Johar ===
- Block-12
- Block-13
- Block-15
- Block-16-A
- Block-17
- Block-18
- Block-19
- Block-20
- Gulshan-e-Iqbal Block-10-A
- Gulistan-e-Jauhar Block 19

== See also ==
- Army Cantonment Board, Pakistan
- Cantonment
