= Karachi Cantonment =

Karachi Cantt.
- Cantonment
- Karachi Cantonment
- Interactive map of Karachi Cantt.
- Country: Pakistan
- Province: Sindh
- City District: Karachi
- Established: August 1942

Government
  - Type: Cantonment Board
  - Body: Karachi Cantonment Board

Area
  - Total: 993.916 km^{2} (383.753 sq mi)

Population (2023)
  - Total: 86,338
- Time zone: Pakistan Standard Time
  - Summer (DST): GMT +05:00
- Website: www.cbkarachi.gov.pk

The Karachi Cantonment (Urdu: کراچی چھاؤنی) is a cantonment town of the city of Karachi, in Sindh, Pakistan.

== History ==
It serves as a Pakistan Army military base and residential establishment. It was originally established by the British in August 1839 as a military base for the British Army, and was taken over by the Pakistan Army in 1947. The cantonment maintains sewerage, sanitation, roads, buildings control, transfer of immoveable properties, death, birth and marriage record of the respective area.

== Demographics ==
Census	Population
1981	27,430
1998	58,088
2017	68,422
2023	86,338

== Railway Station ==
The biggest and busiest railway station of Pakistan, Karachi Cantonment railway station, is also located here.

== Dumlottee Wells ==
Wells were dug and built near the river at Dumlottee in 1881, which supplied five million gallons of water to Karachi Cantonment every day. Dumlottee wells were designed and built by British engineers Temple and Currie in 1882.

== Boundaries ==
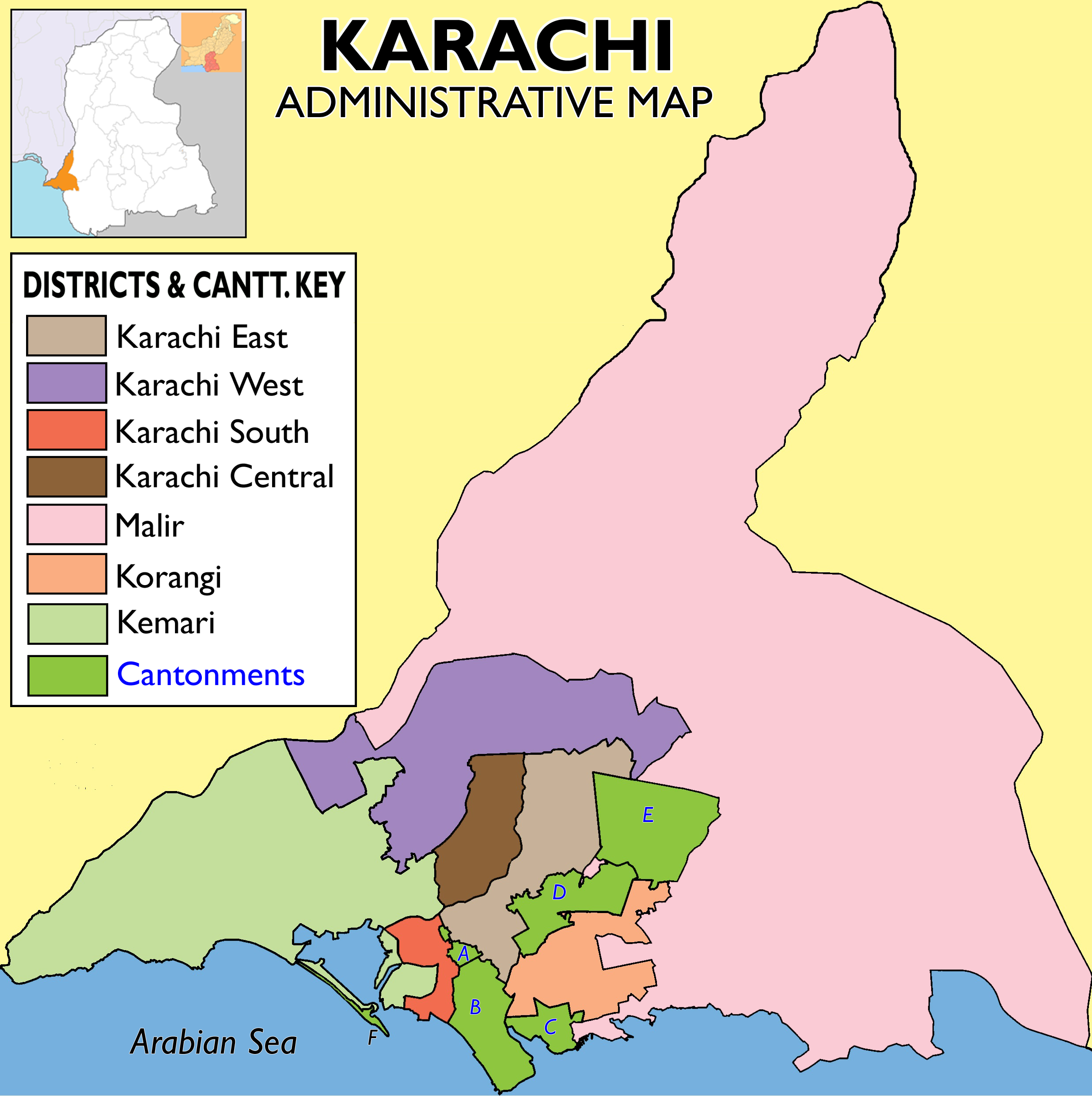
Location of Karachi Cantt. marked 'A' in the administrative map of Karachi.

- North: Garden Area
- South: Karachi Cantonment railway station
- East: FTC Bridge
- West: Arts Council of Pakistan, Sindh Assembly Building

== Landmarks ==
- Karachi Cantonment Railway Station
- Muhammad Ali Jinnah Road
- Shara-e-Faisal
- Finance and Trade Centre
- Fleet Club
- Services Club
- St. Anthony’s Church

== See also ==
- Army Cantonment Board, Pakistan
- Cantonment
