= Manora Fort, Karachi =

Historic fortification in Sindh

Manora Fort
- Part of Manora Cantonment
- Manora, Karachi, Pakistan
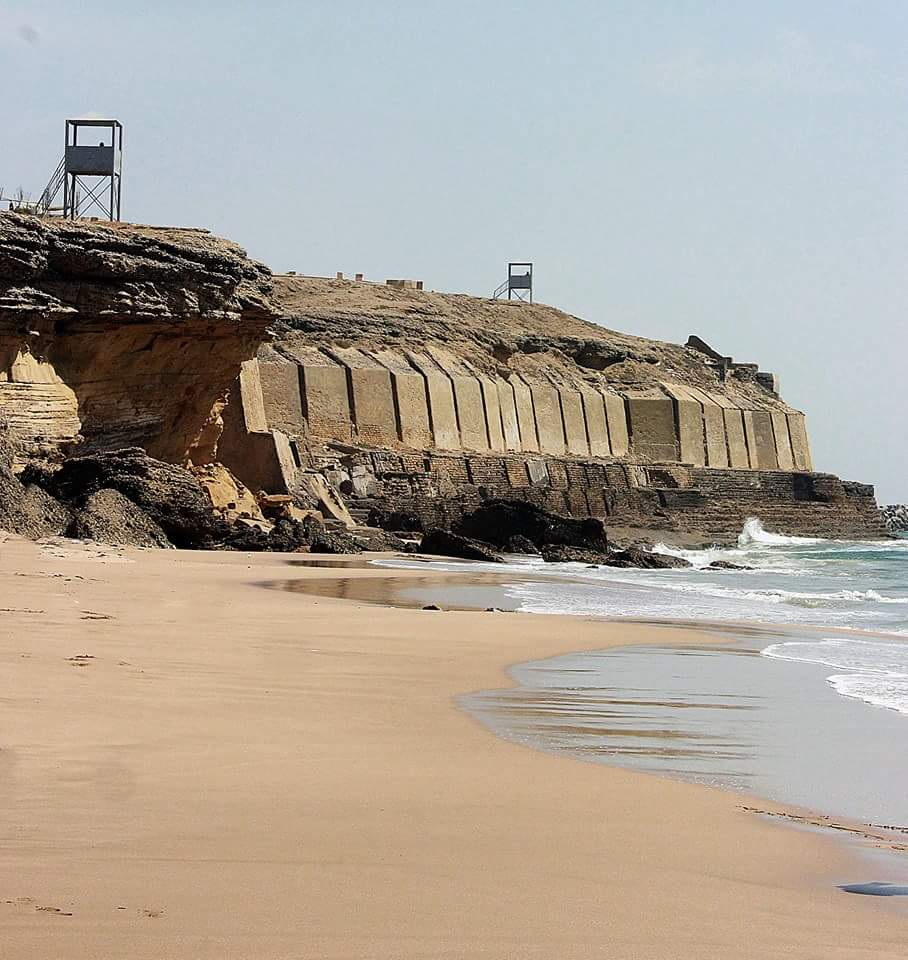
- Manora Fort was captured by the British in 1839, and then reinforced in 1888

Site information
- Type: Fort
- Controlled by: Pakistan Navy

Location
- Coordinates: 24°47′24″N 66°58′46″E

Site history
- Built: 1797; 229 years ago
- Materials: mud fortress (original)

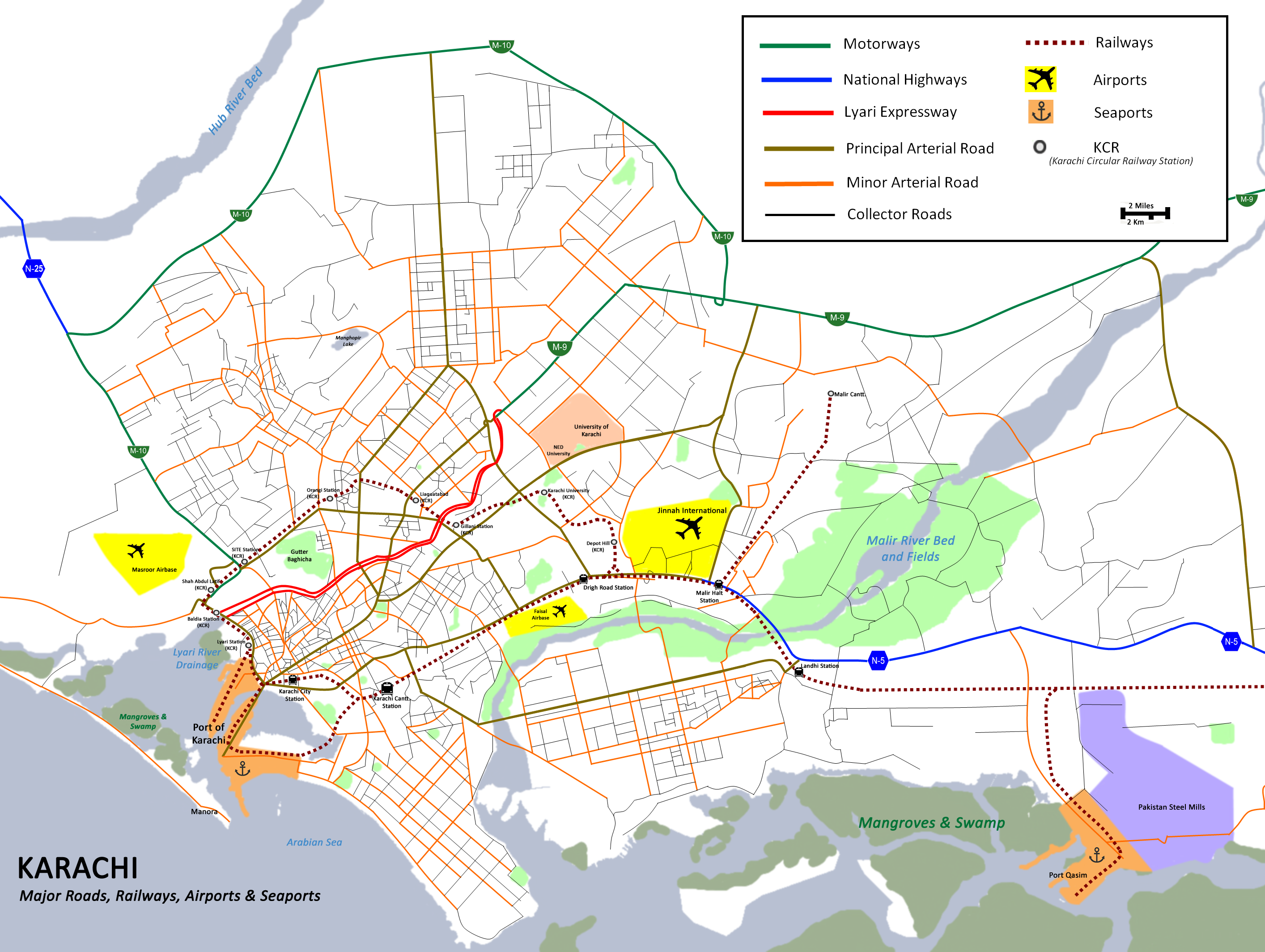
Location of Manora in Karachi

Manora Fort is a fort that was built to protect the harbour of Karachi. Originally erected as a mud fortress by the Talpur Mirs in 1797, the fort was captured by the British in 1839 - after which they seized control of Karachi and lower Sindh.

== History ==
=== Establishment ===
Manora Fort was built by the Talpur dynasty in 1797 in order to protect the port, which handled trade with Oman and Bahrain. The fort was built at the top of cliffs that were 90–100 feet (27–30 m) in height, with a small mosque and a round tower. The fort was used to repel attacks by Qasimi pirates who threatened and sometimes raided Karachi Harbor in the early 19th century. Accounts and extent of piracy have been contested, and it has been suggested that piracy might have been used as a casus belli for the East India Company to seize control of the Persian Gulf region.

=== Capture by the British ===
On 1 February 1839 a British ship, HMS Wellesley (1815), anchored off the island of Manora. On 3 February, the ship opened fire on the fort. When British troops stormed the fort, they reportedly found it guarded by 4 or 5 men, who had no guns to fire back with, and so the fort was quickly surrendered by Wussul Ben Butcha, and Karachi that is now part of Pakistan was captured.

After the fort was captured, the building was used as a residence for the Master-Attendant of the Karachi Port. St. Paul's church was built in the immediate vicinity in 1865. In 1888, the old fort was mostly removed, and the battery reinforced. A lighthouse was built by the British presence in 1889 to assist vessels approaching Karachi harbor.

=== Post-independence ===
After independence in 1947, Manora Fort became the main base of the Pakistan Navy, with berths for naval vessels located along the eastern edge of the island. The island has been governed as a military cantonment since then. The opening of the new Jinnah Naval Base at Ormara, 250 kilometers (160 mi) away, has meant that approximately half of the naval vessels have moved away from Manora. The fort now serves as the headquarters of the Pakistan Marines.

== Gallery ==
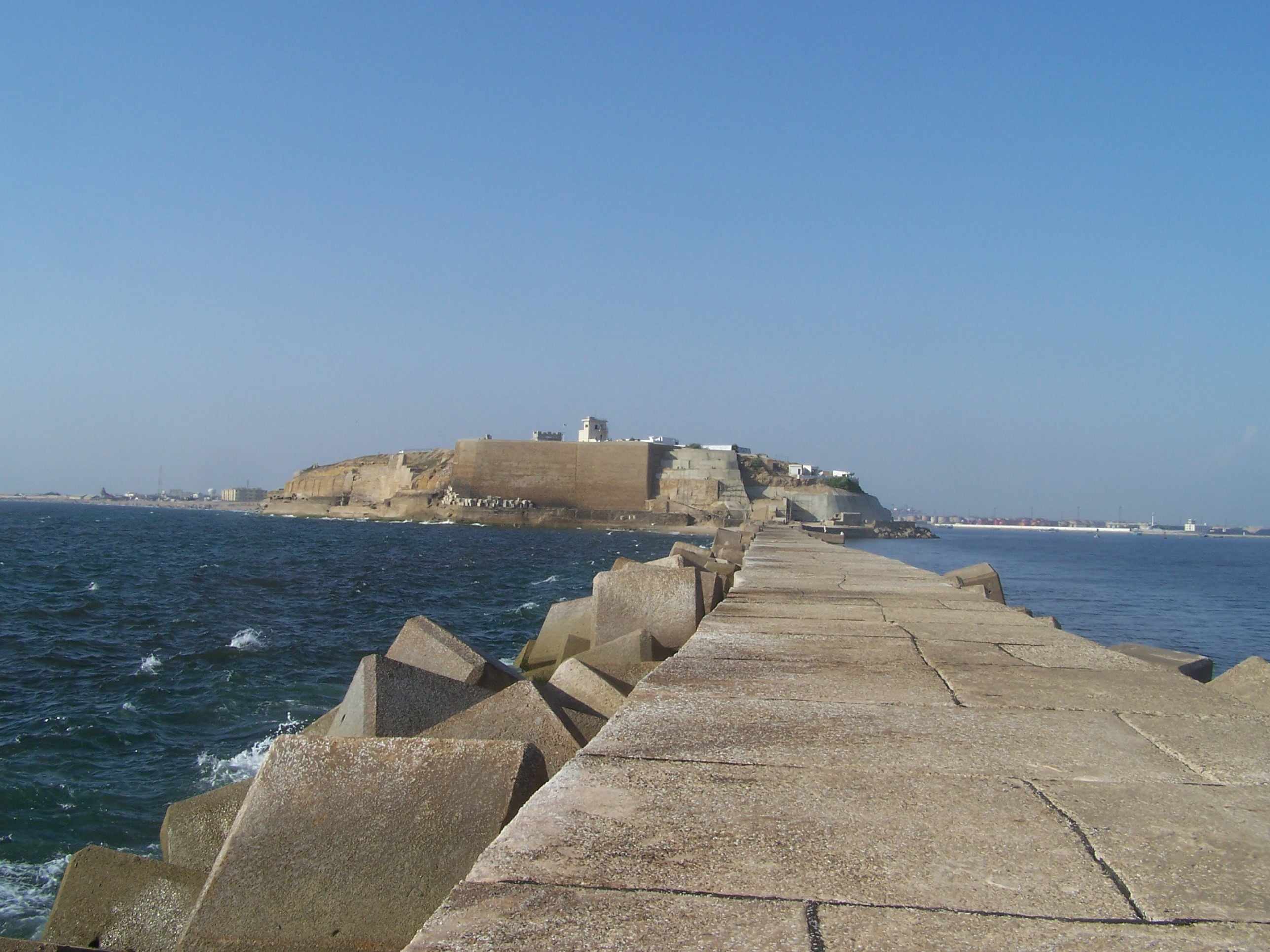
Manora Fort as seen from its breakwater

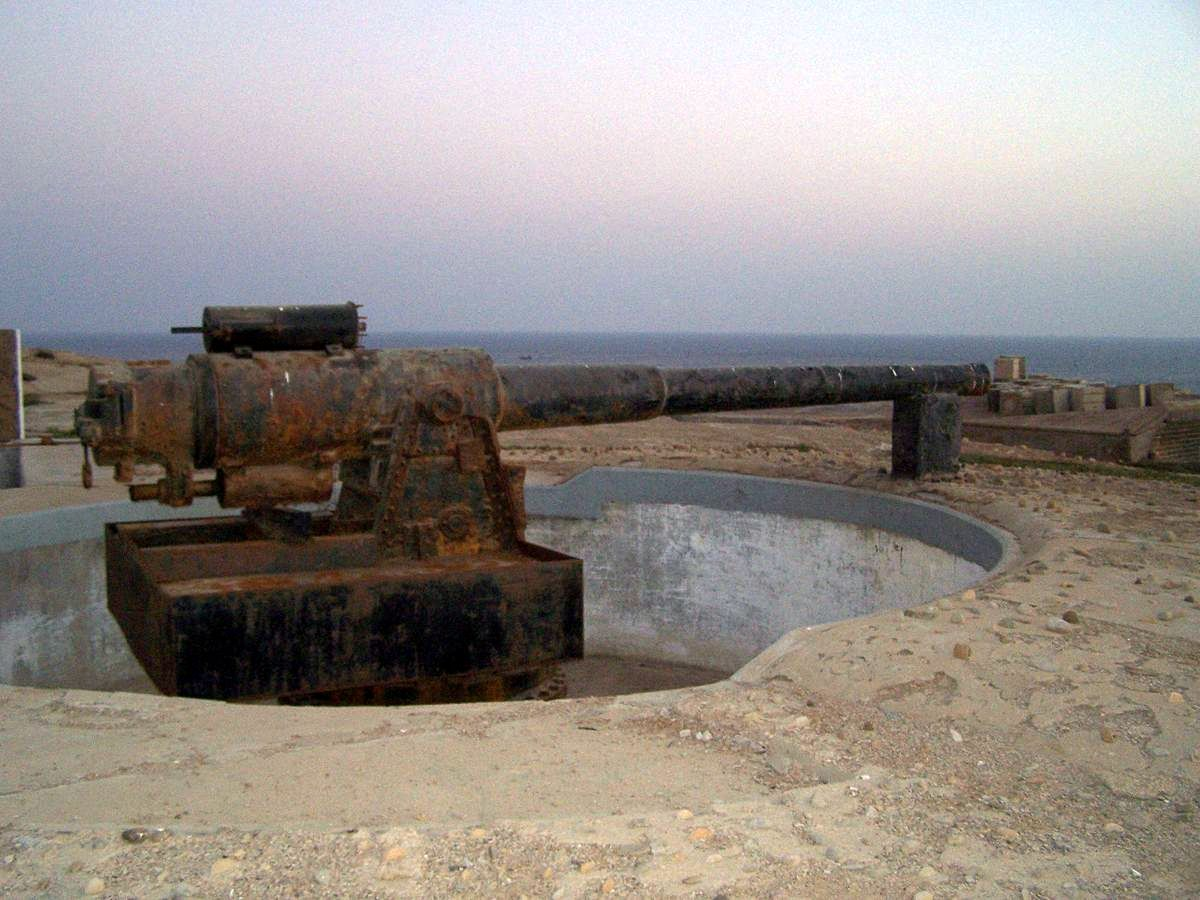
Old anti-ship munitions at the fort

== See also ==
- Manora Cantonment
- Manora, Karachi
- Karachi
- Pakistan Navy
- List of UNESCO World Heritage Sites in Pakistan
- List of forts in Pakistan
- List of museums in Pakistan
