= PNS Himalaya =

Pakistan Navy's training formation on recruit training

Coordinates: 24°47′24″N 66°58′47″E

- Insignia
- Active: November 27, 1943; 82 years ago
- Country: Pakistan
- Branch: Pakistan Navy
- Type: Training formation
- Garrison/HQ: Manora Island, off the coast of Sindh, Pakistan.
- Nickname: HIMALAYA

The Pakistan Navy Station Himalaya (reporting name: PNS Himalaya) is a naval base located in Manora Island, off the coast of Karachi coast, Sindh, Pakistan.

The PNS Himalaya is primarily responsible for conducting the initial orientation of incoming recruits, also known as boot camp and distinguished itself as "Home of Armed Forces Diving School".

The naval base is namesake after the famous Himalaya Mountain Range in Northern Pakistan.

== History ==
The Royal Indian Navy established and commissioned the naval base in Manora Island, which is off the Karachi coast, as HMIS Himayala on 27 November 1943. The naval base is namesake after the famous Himalaya Mountain Range in Northern Pakistan by its British military administrators.

The British Royal Navy established the first Diving Section along with the "Gunnery School", which is now known as the Surface Warfare School in PNS Bahadur. The PNS Himalayas is the only bootcamp of Pakistan Navy and subsequently expanded as a naval base providing the crucial marine training in December 1950. Due to its size and accommodation, the PNS Himayala was home to many of navy's schools before Navy dispersed its assets in different parts of the country in 1980.

The PNS Himalaya also served as a temporary headquarters of the Pakistan Marines when it was recommissioned on 14 April 1990. However, the Pakistan Marines were relocated to PNS Iqbal, and permanently headquartered from PNS Iqbal to the Manora Fort in the PNS Qasim.

Currently, PNS Himalaya is the initial bootcamp of new enrolled sailor candidates in Pakistan Navy.

=== Pakistan Navy Diving School ===
The Pakistan Navy Diving School is an armed forces diving school that provides effective diving training to Pakistan Navy, Marines, Air Force, and the Army personnel. Established as a small diving section, the Pakistan Navy further expanded and upgraded its small facility to a full-fledged military training area dedicated to armed forces diving in 1980.

The Navy's diving school is not restricted to Pakistan Navy as the personnel from the Pakistan Army have also been trained, qualified, and earned their certification pins from the Navy Diving School. In addition, the Diving School has also provided training and qualifications to civilian agencies as well as the navies of allied nations such as Bangladesh, Jordan, Maldives, Oman, Saudi Arabia, Sri Lanka and Turkey.
