= NA-233 Karachi Korangi-II =

Constituency of the National Assembly of Pakistan

- Constituency for the National Assembly of Pakistan
- Region: Landhi Town and Korangi Town (partly) of Korangi District in Karachi
- Electorate: 529,855

Current constituency
- Party: Muttahida Qaumi Movement – Pakistan
- Member: Muhammad Javed Hanif Khan
- Created from: NA-255 Karachi-XVII

NA-233 Karachi Korangi-II (این اے-233،کراچی کورنگی -2) is a constituency for the National Assembly of Pakistan. The constituency represents much of Korangi, and the western parts of Landhi.

== Assembly Segments ==
| Constituency number | Constituency | District | Current MPA | Party |
|---|---|---|---|---|
| 92 | PS-92 Karachi Korangi-III | Korangi District | Wajid Hussain Khan | PTI |
| 93 | PS-93 Karachi Korangi-IV | Korangi District | Sajid Hussain Mir | PTI |
| 94 | PS-94 Karachi Korangi-V | Korangi District | Najam Mirza | MQM-P |

== Members of Parliament ==
=== 2002–2018: NA-255 Karachi-XVII ===
| Election | Member | Party |
|---|---|---|
| 2002 | Mahmood Ahmad Qureshi | MQM-H |
| 2003 | Farooq Sattar | MQM |
| 2008 | Syed Asif Husnain | MQM |
| 2013 | Syed Asif Husnain | MQM |

=== 2018–2023: NA-240 Karachi Korangi-II ===
| Election | Member | Party |
|---|---|---|
| 2018 | Iqbal Muhammad Ali Khan | MQM-P |
| 2022 | Mohammad Abubakar | MQM-P |

=== 2024–present: NA-233 Karachi Korangi-II ===
| Election | Member | Party |
|---|---|---|
| 2024 | Muhammad Javed Hanif Khan | MQM-P |

== Election 2002 ==
General elections were held on 10 October 2002. Mahmood Ahmed Qureshi of Mohajir Qaumi Movement - Haqiqi won by 31,096 votes.

General election 2002: NA-255 Karachi-XVI
| Party | Candidate | Votes | % | ±% |
|---|---|---|---|---|
| MQM-H | Mahmood Ahmed Qureshi | 31,096 | 31.03 | |
| MMA | Muhammad Aslam Mujahid | 27,761 | 27.70 | |
| MQM | Muhammad Abrar-Ul-Haq | 25,646 | 25.59 | |
| PPP | Syed Naeem Uddin | 7,059 | 7.04 | |
| Nizam-e-Mustafa Party | Qadri | 4,164 | 4.16 | |
| PMA | Shamsudduha | 3,119 | 3.11 | |
| Others | Others (five candidates) | 1,385 | 1.37 | |
| Turnout | | 101,447 | 41.18 | |
| Total valid votes | | 100,230 | 98.80 | |
| Rejected ballots | | 1,217 | 1.20 | |
| Majority | | 3,335 | 3.33 | |
| Registered electors | | 246,368 | | |

== By-election 2003 ==
After the death of Mahmood Ahmed Qureshi, By-elections were held on 23 June 2003. Farooq Sattar of Muttahida Qaumi Movement won by 73,334 votes.

== Election 2008 ==
General elections were held on 18 February 2008. Syed Asif Hasnain of Muttahida Qaumi Movement won by 157,971 votes.

General election 2008: NA-255 Karachi-XVI
| Party | Candidate | Votes | % | ±% |
|---|---|---|---|---|
| MQM | Syed Asif Husnain | 157,971 | 82.86 | |
| PPP | Nafees Ahmed Usmani | 31,389 | 16.47 | |
| Others | Others (four candidates) | 1,278 | 0.67 | |
| Turnout | | 192,089 | 57.47 | |
| Total valid votes | | 190,638 | 99.25 | |
| Rejected ballots | | 1,451 | 0.75 | |
| Majority | | 126,582 | 66.39 | |
| Registered electors | | 334,272 | | |
| MQM hold | | | | |

== Election 2013 ==
General elections were held on 11 May 2013. Syed Asif Hasnain of Muttahida Qaumi Movement won by 136,982 votes and became the member of National Assembly.

General election 2013: NA-255 Karachi-XVI
| Party | Candidate | Votes | % | ±% |
|---|---|---|---|---|
| MQM | Syed Asif Husnain | 136,982 | 77.13 | |
| PTI | Khalid Mehmood Ali | 19,033 | 10.72 | |
| JI | Abdul Jameel Khan | 9,338 | 5.26 | |
| MQM-H | Afaq Ahmed | 6,989 | 3.94 | |
| PPP | Jawaid Sheikh | 3,378 | 1.90 | |
| ANP | Abdul Rehman Khan Yousufzai | 1,213 | 0.68 | |
| Others | Others (five candidates) | 674 | 0.37 | |
| Turnout | | 178,971 | 51.54 | |
| Total valid votes | | 177,607 | 99.24 | |
| Rejected ballots | | 1,364 | 0.76 | |
| Majority | | 117,949 | 66.41 | |
| Registered electors | | 347,277 | | |
| MQM hold | | | | |

== Election 2018 ==
General elections were held on 25 July 2018.

General election 2018: NA-240 Karachi Korangi-II
| Party | Candidate | Votes | % | ±% |
|---|---|---|---|---|
| MQM-P | Iqbal Muhammad Ali Khan | 61,165 | 34.41 | |
| TLP | Muhammad Asif Ansari | 30,535 | 17.18 | |
| PTI | Farrukh Manzoor | 29,939 | 16.84 | |
| MMA | Abdul Jameel Khan | 19,321 | 10.87 | |
| MQM-H | Afaq Ahmed | 14,376 | 8.09 | |
| PPP | Sheikh Muhammad Feroze | 7,586 | 4.27 | |
| PSP | Syed Asif Husnain | 6,661 | 3.75 | |
| Others | Others (nine candidates) | 5,375 | 3.02 | |
| Turnout | | 177,759 | 37.38 | |
| Rejected ballots | | 2,801 | 1.57 | |
| Majority | | 30,630 | 17.23 | |
| Registered electors | | 475,523 | | |
| MQM^{†} hold | | Swing | N/A | |

^{†}MQM contested this election as MQM-P

== By-election 2022 ==
By-elections were held on 16 June 2022 after the death of former MNA, Iqbal Muhammad Ali Khan. Mohammad Abubakar of Muttahida Qaumi Movement – Pakistan won by securing 10,683 votes.

By-election 2022: NA-240 Karachi Korangi-II
| Party | Candidate | Votes | % | ±% |
|---|---|---|---|---|
| MQM-P | Mohammad Abubakar | 10,683 | 24.31 | -10.1 |
| TLP | Shahzada Shahbaz | 10,619 | 24.16 | +7.0 |
| MQM-H | Syed Rafi Uddin | 8,383 | 19.07 | +11.0 |
| PPP | Nasir Raheem | 5,248 | 11.94 | +7.6 |
| PSP | Shabbir Qaimkhani | 4,797 | 10.92 | +7.1 |
| Others | Others (twenty candidates) | 4,219 | 9.60 | +7.6 |
| Turnout | | 43,948 | 8.38 | -29.0 |
| Majority | | 67 | 0.15 | |
| Registered electors | | 529,855 | | |
| MQM-P hold | | Swing | N/A | |

== Election 2024 ==
General elections were held on 8 February 2024. Muhammad Javed Hanif Khan won the election with 103,967 votes.

General election 2024: NA-233 Karachi Korangi-II
| Party | Candidate | Votes | % | ±% |
|---|---|---|---|---|
| MQM-P | Muhammad Javed Hanif Khan | 103,967 | 42.20 | ▲17.89 |
| PTI | Muhammad Haris (Note: Filed nomination papers as PTI candidate but ECP allowed him to run as an Independent) | 58,753 | 23.85 | N/A |
| JI | Abdul Jamil Khan | 29,071 | 11.80 | N/A |
| TLP | Shahzada Shahbaz | 15,298 | 6.21 | ▼17.95 |
| PPP | Nida Asim | 7,227 | 2.93 | ▼9.01 |
| MQM-H | Syed Rafi Uddin | 7,090 | 2.88 | ▼16.19 |
| IPP | Muhammad Farooq | 6,739 | 2.74 | N/A |
| Others | Others (twenty candidates) | 18,246 | 7.41 | |
| Turnout | | 249,226 | 46.82 | ▲38.44 |
| Total valid votes | | 246,391 | 98.86 | |
| Rejected ballots | | 2,835 | 1.14 | |
| Majority | | 45,214 | 18.35 | ▲18.20 |
| Registered electors | | 532,267 | | |
| MQM-P hold | | | | |

== See also ==
- NA-232 Karachi Korangi-I
- NA-234 Karachi Korangi-III
