= Bhittai Colony =

Neighbourhood in Karachi, Pakistan

Coordinates: 24.81293°N 67.10771°E

Bhittai Colony (Urdu: بھٹائی کالونی); (Sindhi: ڀٽائي ڪالوني) is a neighborhood of Korangi Town in Karachi, Sindh, Pakistan. This neighborhood is named after the Sufi poet Shah Abdul Latif Bhittai.

There are several ethnic groups including Muhajirs,Sindhis,Punjabis, Kashmiris, Seraikis, Pakhtuns, Balochis, Memons, Bohras and Ismailis. Over 90% of the population is Muslim. Ahmadiyya Muslim community and Non-Muslim like Christian and Hindu communities are also residing there with brotherhood and harmony. Bhittai Colony comes under Korangi Creek Cantonment but is to some extent self-governing. Bhittai colony is subdivided into many sectors (A to H). The colony faces various problems with utilities including sewerage, water, electricity and the condition of roads. Bhittai Colony is also called Korangi Crossing. It connects with three important roads, one going to Main Saddar Bazaar, second to Korangi & Landhi and the third to PAF Base Creek.
