= NA-232 Karachi Korangi-I =

Constituency of the National Assembly of Pakistan

- Constituency for the National Assembly of Pakistan
- Region: Shah Faisal Town and Faisal Cantonment of Korangi District in Karachi
- Electorate: 581,888

Current constituency
- Party: Muttahida Qaumi Movement-Pakistan
- Member: Aasia Ishaque
- Created from: NA-256 Karachi-XVIII

NA-232 Karachi Korangi-I (این اے-232، کراچی کورنگی -۱) is a constituency for the National Assembly of Pakistan that covers Shah Faisal Colony, and Model Colony.

== Assembly Segments ==
Constituency number	Constituency	District	Current MPA	Party
90	PS-90 Karachi Korangi-I	Korangi District	Syed Shariq Jamal	MQM-P
91	PS-91 Karachi Korangi-II	Korangi District	Muhammad Farooq Farhan	JI

== Members of Parliament ==
=== 2018–2023: NA-239 Karachi Korangi-I ===
Election	Member	Party
2018	Akram Cheema	PTI
2022	Imran Khan	PTI

=== 2024–present: NA-232 Karachi Korangi-I ===
Election	Member	Party
2024	Aasia Ishaque	MQM-P

== Election 2002 ==
General elections were held on 10 October 2002. Iqbal Muhammad Ali Khan of Muttahida Qaumi Movement won by 39,196 votes.

General election 2002: NA-256 Karachi Central-XVIII
Party	Candidate	Votes	%	±%
MQM	Iqbal Muhammad Ali Khan	39,196	43.16	
MMA	Muhammad Hasim Siddiqur	22,142	24.38	
MQM-H	Syed Abid Ali Jaffri	6,430	7.08	
PPP	Riaz Ahmed Mazari	6,414	7.06	
PML(N)	Syed Muhammad Nihal Hashmi	6,305	6.94	
PST	Dr. Qadeer Ahmed Abbasi	3,409	3.75	
PTI	Syed Marghoob Hussain	2,397	2.64	
Independent	Rana Munir Ahmed Khan	2,082	2.29	
Others	Others (ten candidates)	2,435	2.70	
Turnout		91,683	35.01	
Total valid votes		90,810	99.05	
Rejected ballots		873	0.95	
Majority		17,054	18.78	
Registered electors		261,912		

== Election 2008 ==
General elections were held on 18 February 2008. Iqbal Muhammad Ali Khan of Muttahida Qaumi Movement won by 123,491 votes.

General election 2008: NA-256 Karachi Central-XVIII
Party	Candidate	Votes	%	±%
MQM	Iqbal Muhammad Ali Khan	123,491	75.36	
PPP	Mirza Maqbool Ahmed	23,829	14.54	
PML(N)	Zain-ul-Abideen Ansari	15,654	9.55	
Others	Others (four candidates)	894	0.55	
Turnout		165,194	44.48	
Total valid votes		163,868	99.20	
Rejected ballots		1,326	0.80	
Majority		99,662	60.82	
Registered electors		371,383		
MQM hold				

== Election 2013 ==
General elections were held on 11 May 2013. Iqbal Muhammad Ali Khan of Muttahida Qaumi Movement won by 151,788 votes and became the member of National Assembly.

General election 2013: NA-256 Karachi Central-XVIII
Party	Candidate	Votes	%	±%
MQM	Iqbal Muhammad Ali Khan	151,788	60.38	
PTI	Muhammad Zubair Khan	69,072	27.48	
JUP (N)	Muhammad Owais Noorani	18,732	7.45	
PPP	Syed Manzoor Abbas	4,347	1.73	
TTP	Muhammad Arshad Taqi	3,144	1.25	
Independent	Osama Razi	1,320	0.53	
Others	Others (ten candidates)	2,996	1.18	
Turnout		255,791	55.71	
Total valid votes		251,399	98.28	
Rejected ballots		4,392	1.72	
Majority		82,716	32.90	
Registered electors		459,185		
MQM hold				

== Election 2018 ==
General elections were held on 25 July 2018.

General election 2018: NA-239 Karachi Korangi-I
Party	Candidate	Votes	%	±%
PTI	Akram Cheema	69,147	30.84	
MQM-P	Khuwaja Sohail Mansoor	68,811	30.69	
TLP	Syed Zaman Ali Jafari	30,109	13.43	
PML(N)	Rana Muhammad Ehsan	19,616	8.75	
MMA	Muhammad Haleem Khan Ghauri	12,290	5.48	
PPP	Syed Imran Haider Abidi	11,887	5.30	
Others	Others (thirteen candidates)	9,077	4.05	
Turnout		224,218	42.41	
Rejected ballots		3,281	1.46	
Majority		336	0.15	
Registered electors		528,732		
PTI gain from MQM-P				

== By-election 2022 ==
A by-election was held on 16 October 2022 due to the resignation of Muhammad Akram, the previous MNA from this seat. Imran Khan won by a margin of 24,625 votes.

By-election 2022: NA-239 Karachi Korangi-I
Party	Candidate	Votes	%	±%
PTI	Imran Khan	50,014	58.22	▲27.38
MQM-P	Syed Nayyar Raza	18,116	21.08	▼9.61
TLP	Muhammad Yasin	7,953	9.26	▼4.97
PPP	Imran Haider Abdi	4,506	5.24	▼0.06
MQM-H	Khurram Maqsood	1,590	1.85	▲0.94
PSP	Sharak Jamal	1,208	1.41	▼0.58
Others	Others (sixteen candidates)	2,524	2.94	
Turnout		86,568	14.88	▼27.53
Rejected ballots		657	0.76	▼0.70
Majority		31,898	37.13	▲36.18
Registered electors		581,888		
PTI hold				

== Election 2024 ==
General elections were held on 8 February 2024. Aasia Ishaque won the election with 84,592 votes.

General election 2024: NA-232 Karachi Korangi-I
Party	Candidate	Votes	%	±%
MQM-P	Aasia Ishaque	84,592	33.56	
PTI	Adeel Ahmed (Note: Filed nomination papers as PTI candidate but ECP allowed him to run as an Independent)	66,753	26.48	
JI	Taufeeq Uddin Siddiqui	41,439	16.44	N/A
Independent	Akram Cheema	15,704	6.23	N/A
TLP	Muhammad Yaseen	14,602	5.79	
Independent	Mohammad Aftab Uddin Baqai	12,220	4.85	N/A
Others	Others (thirty candidates)	16,737	6.64	
Turnout		255,836	43.06	▲28.18
Total valid votes		252,047	98.52	
Rejected ballots		3,789	1.48	
Majority		17,839	7.08	
Registered electors		594,131		
MQM-P gain from PTI				

== See also ==
- NA-231 Karachi Malir-III
- NA-233 Karachi Korangi-II
