= Rafah-e-Aam Society =

Neighborhood in Karachi, Pakistan

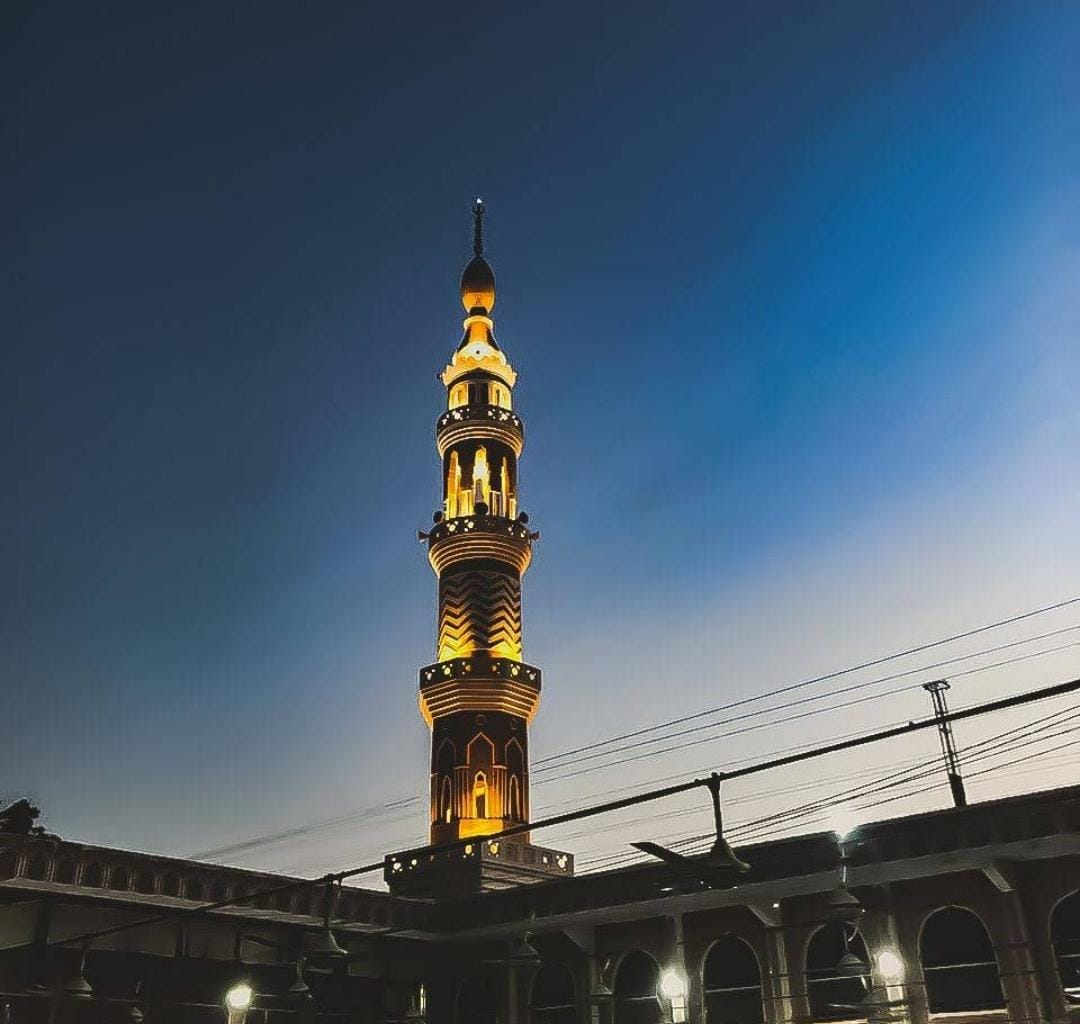
Minaret of Jamia Farooqia Mosque.

Rafah-e-Aam Society (Urdu: رفاہ عام سوسائٹی) is a neighborhood in the Korangi District in eastern Karachi, Pakistan. It was previously part of Shah Faisal Town, which was an administrative unit that was disbanded in 2011. Its old name was "Allahabad Town". Rafah-e-Aam Society's postal code is 75210.

There are several ethnic groups residing in Rafah-e-Aam Society; dominated by around 96% Urdu-speaking, the other 4% of people belonging from other ethnicities including Pakhtuns, Balochis and Punjabis. Over 99% of the population is Muslim.

Rafah-e-Aam Society contains Rafah-e-Aam Park, Ladies Park, Jamia Masjid Mosque, Union Council office, Johar Park Ground, Rafah-e-Aam Market and a commercial street.

== See also ==
- Punjab Town
- Al-Falah Society
- Bilal Town
