= Shah Faisal (disambiguation) =

Shah Faisal or Faisal of Saudi Arabia (1906-1975) was the king of Saudi Arabia from 2 November 1964 to 25 March 1975.

Shah Faisal may also refer to:

- Shah Faisal (cricketer) (born 1996), a Pakistani cricketer
- Shah Faisal Town, a town in Karachi, Sindh, Pakistan
  - Shah Faisal Colony, a residential and commercial area in Shah Faisal Town, Pakistan
- Shah Faisal Masjid, a mosque in Islamabad, Pakistan
