= Korangi Creek Cantonment =

Army cantonment in Karachi, Pakistan

Korangi Creek
- Cantonment
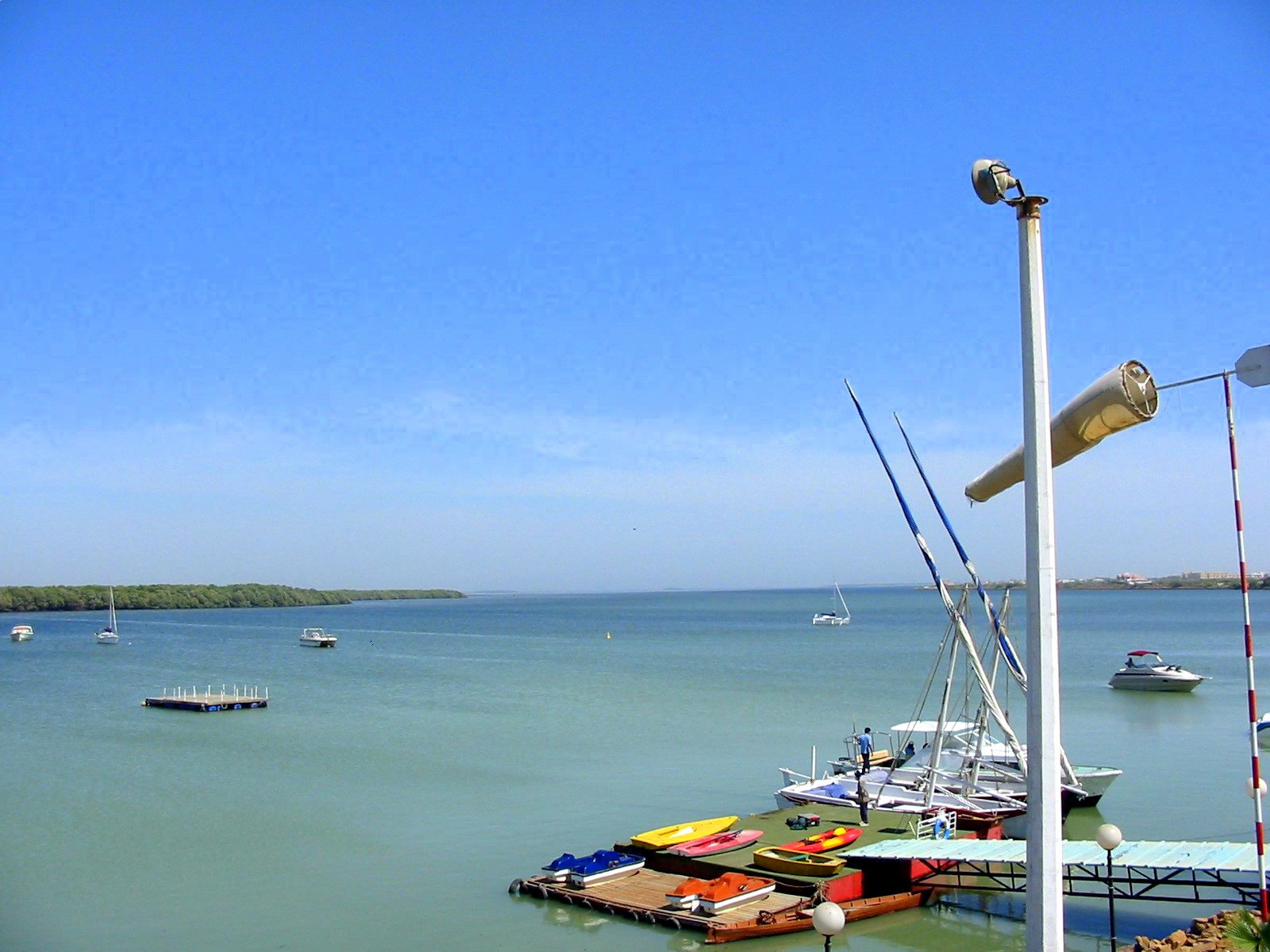
- Korangi Creek
- Interactive map of Korangi Creek
- Country: Pakistan
- Province: Sindh
- City District: Karachi

Population (2017 Census of Pakistan)
  - Total: 57,745

Korangi Creek Cantonment or Korangi Cantonment (Urdu: کورنگی کریک چھاؤنی) is a military cantonment in Korangi Town within Malir District of the city of Karachi, in Sindh, Pakistan.

It serves as a military base and residential establishment. It was established by the British Colonial Army in the 19th-century British Raj and by Fort Wrigley. Currently, the former local seat of the British Wrigley-Pimley-McKerr family still stands.

The cantonment was transferred to Pakistan Army after independence in 1947. The cantonment maintains its own infrastructure of water and electricity and is located outside the jurisdiction of the City District Government of Karachi.

== Korangi Creek ==
On the eastern side of Karachi—between Karachi and Keti Bandar - the area extending from Korangi to Rehri Creek at the north-eastern side is known as the Korangi Creek which further extends to Phitti, Gizri, Khuddi, Khai, Pitiani, Dobbo, Sisa, Hajamro, Turshian and Khobar creeks. Korangi – Phitti is an area of about 64,000 hectares which is just over one-tenth of the tidal area of the Indus River Delta. It comprises dense mangroves and tidal creeks, mud flats, and sand. The distance between Bundal and Gharo, the farthest end is about 51.4 km (32 mi) .

== Korangi Creek Industrial Park ==
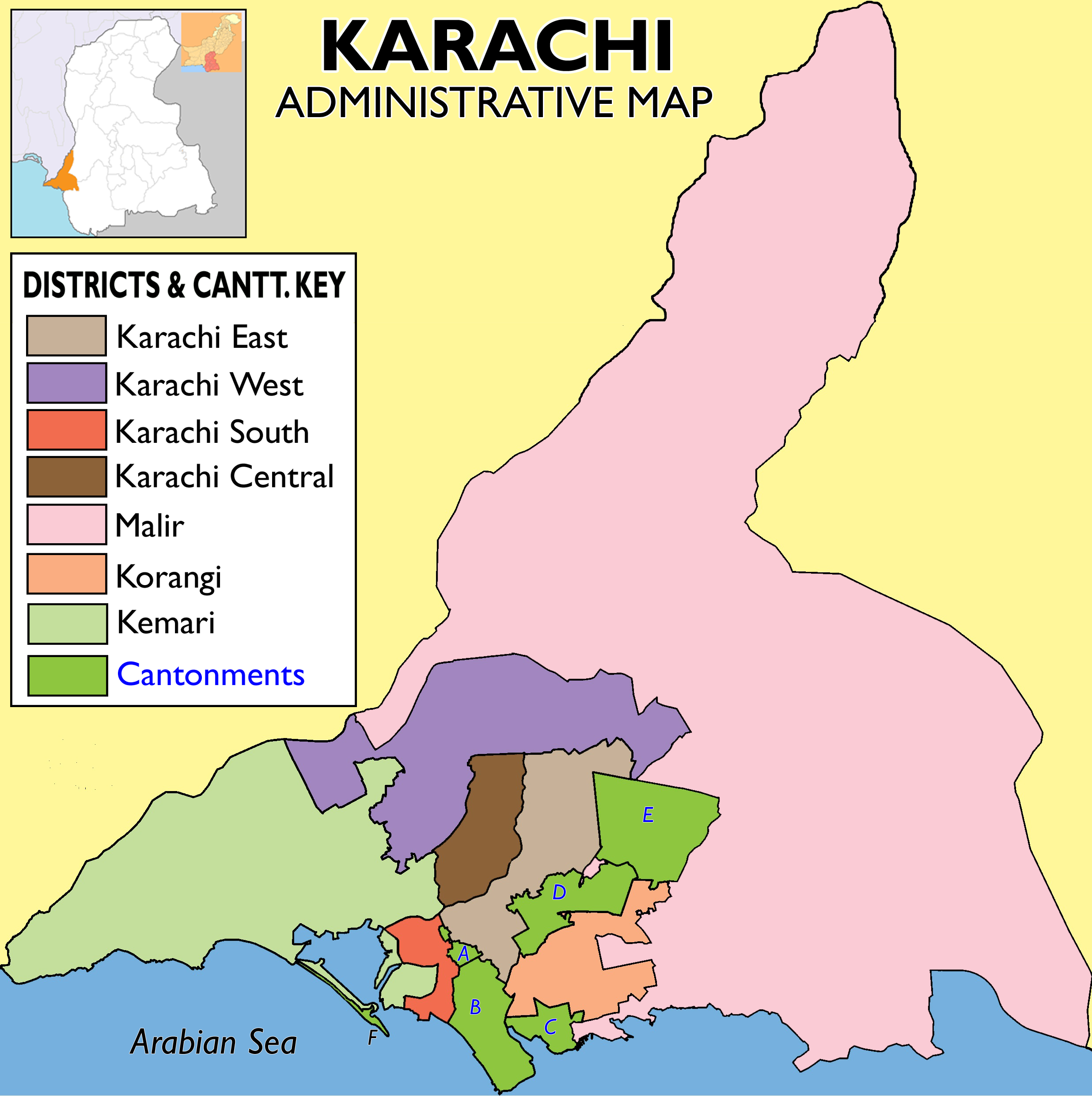
Location of Korangi Creek Cantt. marked 'C' in the administrative map of Karachi.

Korangi Creek Industrial Park is located in Korangi Creek Cantonment. Korangi Creek Industrial Park is built over an area of 101.1 ha (250 acres).

It is located in Sector 38, Korangi Industrial Area, Karachi, Sindh.

The project cost 3.3 billion.

== See also ==
- Army Cantonment Board, Pakistan
- Ibrahim Hyderi
- Faisal Cantonment
- Cantonment
- PAF Base Korangi
- Korangi
- Korangi Town
- Korangi District
- Korangi J Area
- Korangi Industrial Area
- Korangi (disambiguation)
- Korangi railway station
