= Korangi District =

Korangi District in the metropolitan city of Karachi, Pakistan

Coordinates: 24.8844°N 67.1443°E

Korangi District ضلع کورنگی
- District of Karachi Division
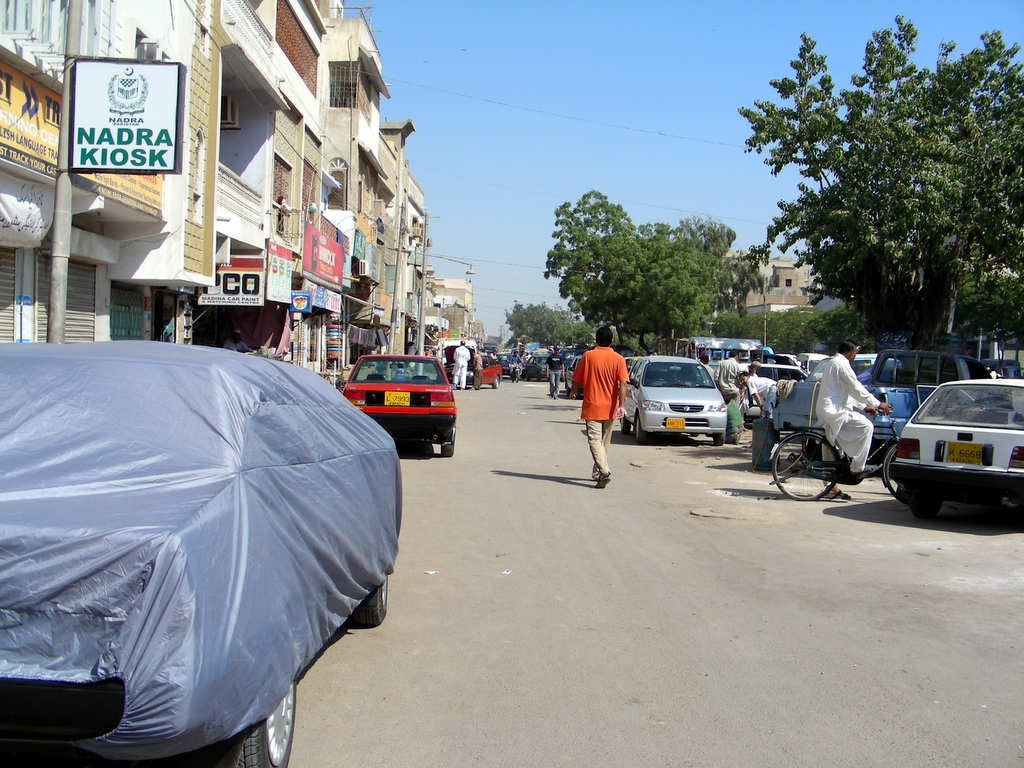
- Street in Korangi Town

- Seal
- Etymology: Karachi East
- Map of Korangi District
- Country: Pakistan
- Province: Sindh
- Division: Karachi Division
- Preceded: District Karachi East (1972-2013)
- Established: 2013; 13 years ago
- Headquarters: DMC Korangi
- Administrative Subdivisions (Tehsils): 04: Korangi Subdivision Landhi Subdivision Model Colony Subdivision Shah Faisal Subdivision

Government
  - Type: District Administration
  - Body: Deputy Commissioner
  - Deputy Commissioner: Syed Jawad Muzaffar (MQM-P)
  - Administrator: Javed Rehman Kalwar (MQM-P)
  - Constituensy: NA-232 Karachi Korangi-I; NA-233 Karachi Korangi-II; NA-234 Karachi Korangi-III

Area
  - Total: 108 km^{2} (42 sq mi)
- Elevation: 9 m (30 ft)

Population (2023)
  - Total: 3,127,976
  - Density: 28,972/km^{2} (75,040/sq mi)
- Demonym: Karachiite

Literacy
  - Literacy rate: Total: 79.86%; Male: 81.27%; Female: 78.29%
- Time zone: UTC+05:00 (PKT)
  - Summer (DST): DST is not observed
- ZIP Code: 74900
- NWD (area) code: 021
- ISO 3166 code: PK-SD
- Website: dmckorangi.gos.pk

Korangi District (Sindhi: ڪورنگي ضلعو; Urdu: ضلع کورنگی) is one of the seven administrative districts of Karachi Division, created in 2013 after the area's split from Karachi East District. Located in eastern Karachi in the province of Sindh, Pakistan, its population was 3,127,976 at the 2023 census.

== Town Municipal Committee ==
As per the Sindh Local Government Act, 2021, Sindh government replaced the previous seven District Municipal Corporations (DMCs) with 26 towns, each with its own municipal committee. Korangi District has four towns.

- Shah Faisal Town
- Landhi Town
- Korangi Town
- Model Colony Town, Karachi

== History ==
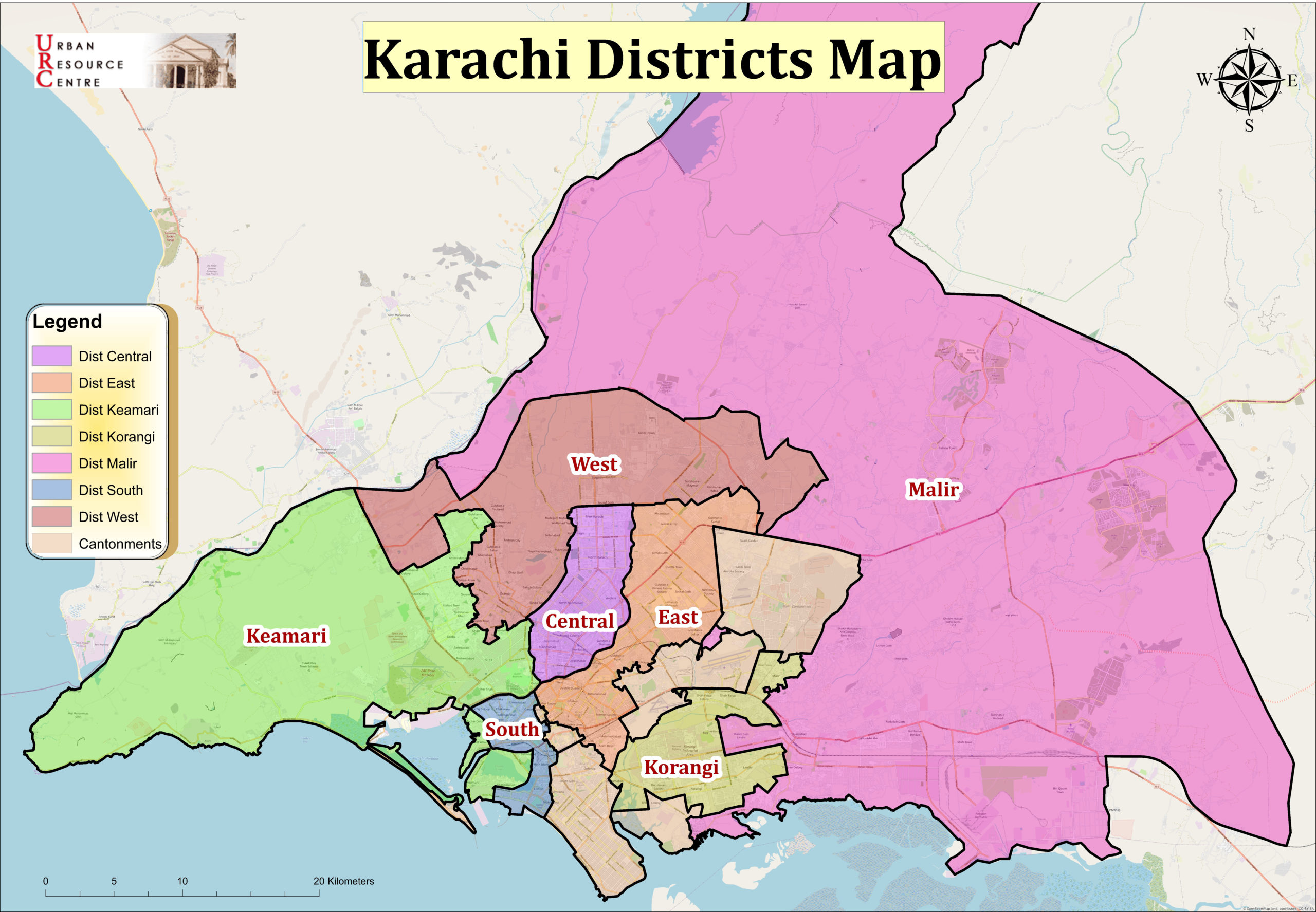
Districts of Karachi Division

The district was a part of District East in Karachi, which was divided in November 2013.

The district is diverse with its population comprising Baloch, Pashtun, Sindhi, Punjabi and other ethnicities.

The district suffers from water crisis and contamination issues. A reverse osmosis plant was inaugurated in Union Council 35 of District Municipal Corporation (DMC) Korangi on 6 March 2017.

== Demographics ==
Historical population
Year	Pop.	±% p.a.
1961	...	—
1972	...	—
1981	...	—
1998	1,608,609	—
2017	2,577,556	+2.51%
2023	3,128,971	+3.28%

At the time of the 2017 census, Korangi had a sex ratio of 913 females per 1000 males and a literacy rate of 80.19%: 81.56% for males and 78.68% for females. The entire population lived in urban areas. 578,964 (22.46%) were under 10 years of age. In 2023, the district had 493,504 households and a population of 3,127,976.

Languages

Languages of Korangi district (2023)
1. Urdu (70.5%)
2. Punjabi (9.53%)
3. Sindhi (5.52%)
4. Pashto (4.31%)
5. Saraiki (2.73%)
6. Hindko (2.64%)
7. Others (4.79%)

At the time of the 2023 census, 2,204,623 (70.48%) of the population spoke Urdu, 298,075 (9.53%) Punjabi, 172,684 (5.52%) Sindhi, 134,924 (4.31%) Pashto, 85,428 (2.73%) Saraiki and 82,491 (2.64%) Hindko, 22,574 Balochi, 6,056 Kashmiri, 1,422 Brahui, 6,752 Shina, 6,924 Balti, 8,247 Mewati, 59 Kalasha, 800 Kohistani and 76,917 others, as their first language.

Religions

The majority religion is Islam, with 96.03% of the population. Christianity is practiced by 3.42% of the population.

Religions in Korangi district (2023)
Religion	Percent
Islam	96.03%
Christianity	3.42%
Hinduism	0.44%
Other	0.11%

== Administrative towns ==
Korangi District has three administrative towns.

=== Korangi Town ===
Union Council
U.C. 1 Bilal Colony
U.C. 2 Nasir Colony
U.C. 3 Chakra Goth
U.C. 4 Mustafa Taj Colony
U.C. 5 Hundred Quarters
U.C. 6 Gulzar Colony
U.C. 7 Korangi Sector 33
U.C. 10 Korangi Sector 34
U.C. 8 Zaman Town
U.C. 9 Hasrat Mohani Colony

=== Landhi Town ===
Union Council
U.C. 1 Old Muzafarabad
U.C. 2 Muslimabad
U.C. 3 Dawood Chowrangi
U.C. 4 Moinabad
U.C. 5 Sharafi Goth
U.C. 6 Bhutto Nagar
U.C. 7 Khawaja Ajmeer Colony
U.C. 8 Landhi
U.C. 9 Awami Colony
U.C. 10 Burmee Colony
U.C. 11 Korangi
U.C. 12 Sherabad

=== Shah Faisal Town ===
Union Council
U.C. 1 Natha Khan Goth
U.C. 2 Pak Sadat Colony
U.C. 3 Drigh Colony
U.C. 4 Raita Plot
U.C. 5 Moria Khan Goth
U.C. 6 Albadar
U.C. 7 Al-Falah Society

=== Model Colony Town ===
Union Council
U.C. 1 Khazmabad
U.C. 2 Indus Mehran
U.C. 3 Khokhra Par
U.C. 4 Liaquat Market
U.C. 5 Kala Board
U.C. 6 Haji Rahim Khan Jokhio
U.C. 7 Rafi Bungalow
U.C. 8 Jamiya Milya

== List of Dehs ==
The following is a list of Korangi District's dehs, organised by taluka:

- Shah Faisal taluka (2 dehs)
  - Drigh
  - Drigh Road
- Model Colony taluka (2 dehs)
  - Mehran-II
  - Thano-II
- Landhi taluka (2 dehs)
  - Phihai-II
  - Sahrafi-I
- Korangi taluka (2 dehs)
  - Dih
  - Phihai-I

== See also ==
- Divisions of Pakistan
  - Divisions of Balochistan
  - Divisions of Khyber Pakhtunkhwa
  - Divisions of Punjab
  - Divisions of Sindh
  - Divisions of Azad Kashmir
  - Divisions of Gilgit-Baltistan
- Tehsils of Pakistan
  - Tehsils of Punjab, Pakistan
  - Tehsils of Khyber Pakhtunkhwa, Pakistan
  - Tehsils of Balochistan, Pakistan
  - Tehsils of Sindh, Pakistan
  - Tehsils of Azad Kashmir
  - Tehsils of Gilgit-Baltistan
- Districts of Pakistan
  - Districts of Khyber Pakhtunkhwa, Pakistan
  - Districts of Punjab, Pakistan
  - Districts of Balochistan, Pakistan
  - Districts of Sindh, Pakistan
  - Districts of Azad Kashmir
  - Districts of Gilgit-Baltistan
- Subdivisions in Karachi
- Korangi
- Korangi Town
- Korangi Creek Cantonment
- Korangi (disambiguation)
