= Golden Town =

Golden Town is a town located in Karachi, in the Pakistan province of Sindh. Nearby towns include Moria Khan Goth, Azeem Pura and Green Town. The people living in this town are Hinko speaking people, Pashtun People, Punjabi people, Saraiki people, Sindhi people and Muhajir people.

The roads and streets are unsatisfactory. The main Big Mosque of the town is Jama masjid Soharwardia and another mosques include Jama masjid Aqsa, Jama Masjid Khizra, Jama Masjid Madina, Jama Masjid Omer and Shamsi masjid. Here some private clinic working, Shamsi hospital and Star hospital. Most people work at the airport and many Airport Security Force employees live here as a tenant. Quaid-e-Azam international Airport is approximately 1 km from this town.

To access Golden Town from shahrah-e-faisal you need to pass through railway crossing known as Wireless Gate. As you enter wireless gate you can find Bab-e-Shamsi Masjid on your right and Star Hospital and different Banks on your Left, as you cross the masjid you enter into Golden Town, on the right side of the same road there is Shamsi Society.

The town approximately houses 2000-3000 families of different sizes and different ethnicity, as being the part of Cosmopolitan City Karachi. The town is not house of one political party, all parties have representation.
