= Nasla Tower =

Residential building in Karachi

- نسلہ ٹاور
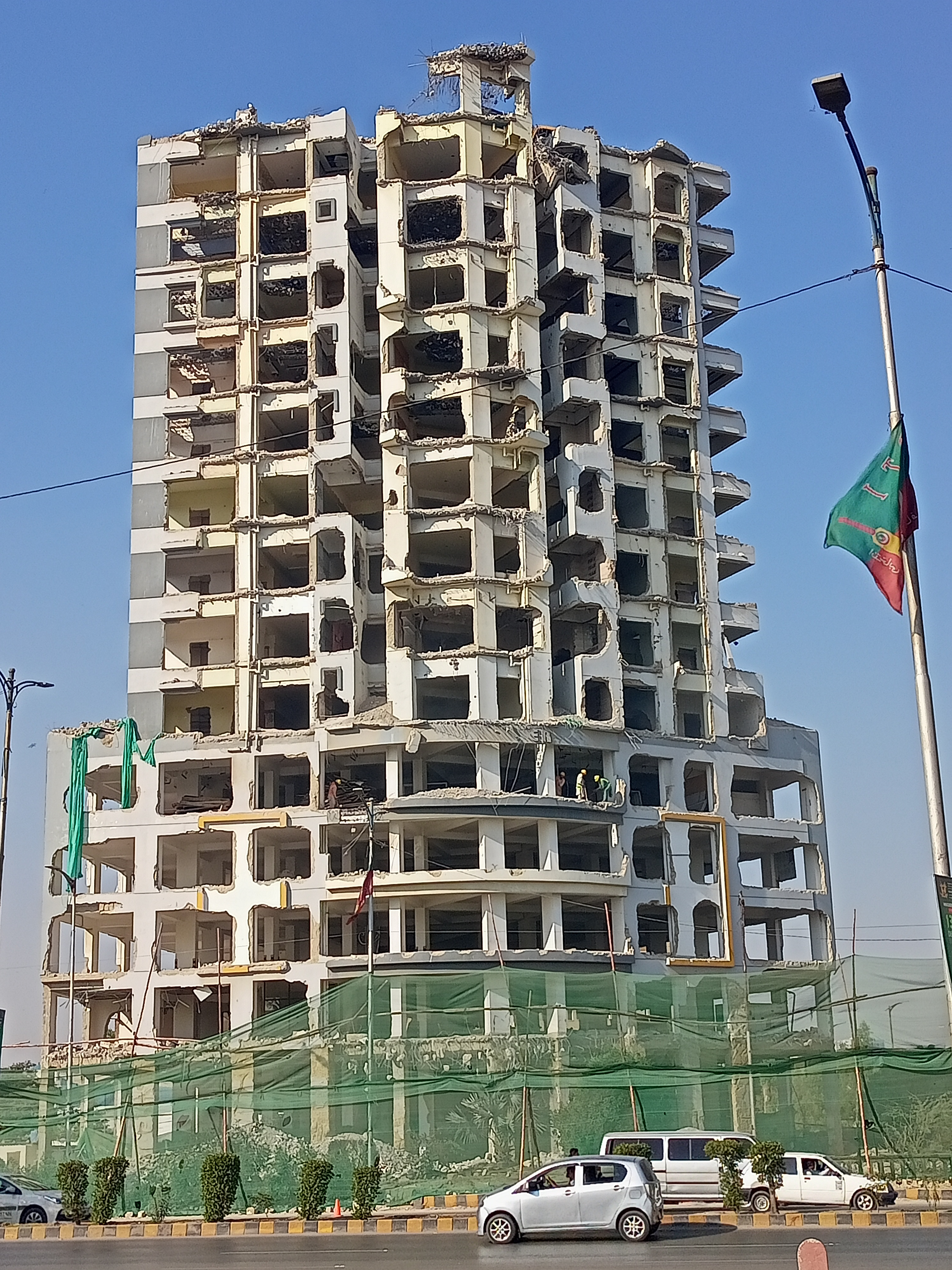
- Interactive map of the Nasla Tower area

General information
- Type: Residential
- Location: Karachi, Pakistan, Shahrah-e-Faisal, Pakistan
- Coordinates: 24.860266°N 67.058425°E
- Current tenants: 44
- Demolished: 5 Feb 2022

Technical details
- Floor count: 11

Nasla Tower (نسلہ ٹاور) was a seventeen storey building located on Shahrah-e-Faisal, Karachi. In the encroachment case pending in the Supreme Court of Pakistan, the Supreme Court has ordered immediate demolition of Nasla Tower, a residential project in Plot No. 193 Sindhi Muslim Housing Society at the confluence of Shahra-e-Qaedin and Shahra-e-Faisal.

On July 31, 2023, the Anti-Corruption Court in Karachi arrested Manzoor Qadir Kaka, the former Director General of Sindh Building Control Authority (SBCA), following the cancellation of his bail. The arrest came after Investigating Officer and lawyer Sarkar Sharafuddin opposed the bail, alleging that Manzoor Qadir Kaka had illegally approved the map of Nasla Tower, and that he and other accused individuals had unlawfully increased the land area of Nasla Tower from 700 square yards to 1100 square yards.

== The protest ==
The 44 residents refused to vacate the flat, blaming the government for allowing the illegal project to go ahead, now that they already own all the legal documentation.
