= Landhi =

Residential neighbourhood in Karchi, Pakistan

Landhi لانڈھی
- Municipality
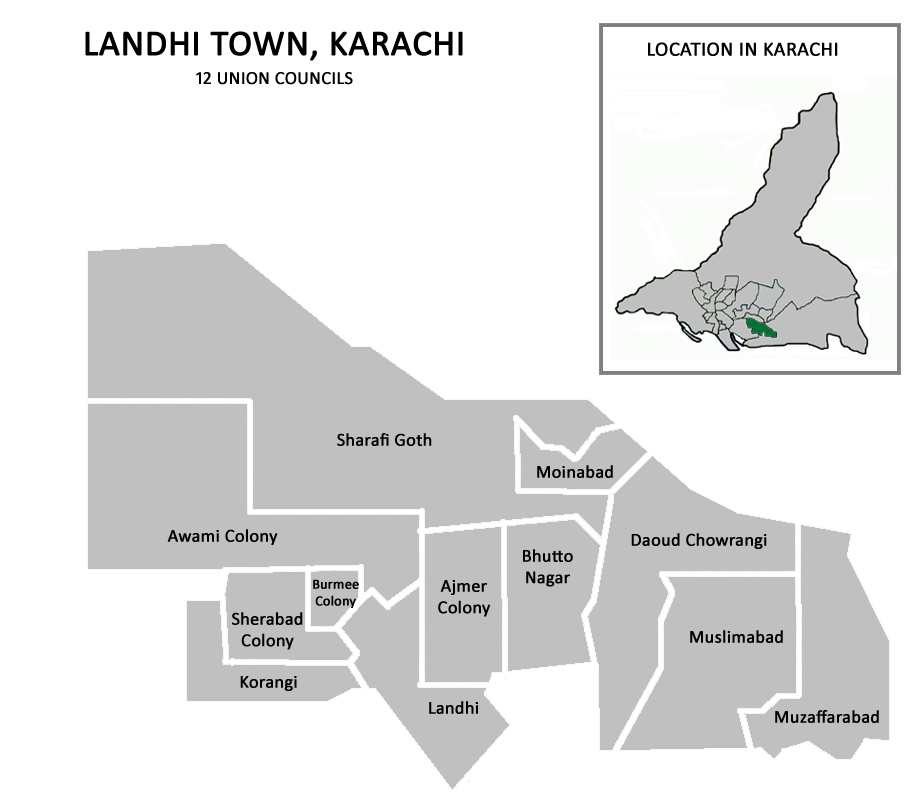
- Sublocalities of Landhi Town
- Coordinates: 24.8504°N 67.1999°E
- Country: Pakistan
- Province: Sindh
- City District: Karachi
- Union Councils: Awami Colony, Bhutto Nagar, Burmee Colony, Dawood Chowrangi, Khawaja Ajmeer Colony, Korangi, Landhi, Moinabad, Muslimabad, Muzafarabad, Sharafi Goth, Sherabad

Government
  - Constituency: NA-233 Karachi Korangi-II
  - National Assembly Member: Muhammad Javed Hanif Khan (MQM-P)

Population (1998)
  - Total: 666,748

Landhi (Urdu: لانڈھی) is a residential neighbourhood and industrial municipality in the eastern part of Karachi, Pakistan. It is bordered by Faisal Cantonment and Shah Faisal Colony to the north across the Malir River, Bin Qasim Port to the south and east, and Korangi to the west.

== Demographics ==
The population of Landhi was estimated to be over 660,000 at the 1998 census, of which 99% are Muslim. Muhajirs constitute an overwhelming majority of the population, followed by Pakhtoon, Sindhi and Baloch.

== Economy ==
Landhi Industrial Area and Landhi Export Processing Zone are two major industrial areas where many companies have manufacturing facilities, such as Ghani Glass, Dawlance, International Industries Limited, Abbott Laboratories, and textile companies like Gul Ahmed, Al Karam, Artistic Millner, Feroz1888, Soorti, Yunus Textile, etc.

== Neighbourhoods ==
The town of Landhi is a middle-class area. Landhi Town has great educational institutions like National University(FAST), Mono-Technical College, Science and Commerce College, Maryam Girls College. Baber Market at Landhi 3 is the biggest Market of Town. Town Municipal Administration Office is at Landhi 5. This includes the neighbourhoods of Dawood Chowrangi, Quaidabad, Malir, Moinabad, Muslimabad, and Muzafarabad, which form a cluster in the eastern part of the town. The neighbourhood of Sharafi Goth in the north of the town along the Malir River is the least densely populated neighbourhood. The town was initially built for Mohajirs who came to Pakistan from India after 1947. It was generally a planned area but due to government inefficiency and corruption at upper levels, this town is a Katchi Abadi. There were several forced takeovers of government parks and lands. Also encroachments of government land in front of houses and commercial areas has completely reshaped the Landhi Town.

- Awami Colony
- Bhutto Nagar is named after former Prime Minister Zulfikar Ali Bhutto
- Sher Pao Colony
- Dawood Chowrangi
- Future Colony
- Menhsera Colony
- Khawaja Ajmeer Colony is named after Khwaja Moinuddin Chishti of Ajmer.
- Burmee Colony is named for the Rohingya refugees who hail from Myanmar (formerly Burma)
- Korangi lies on the eastern side of Karachi between Karachi and Keti Bandar – the area extending from Korangi to Rehri Creek.
- Landhi is home to Babar Market, one of Asia's largest open air markets. Landhi railway station is also located in this area.
- Moinabad
- Muslimabad
- Majeed Colony
- Muzafarabad
- Sharafi Goth
- Sherabad

== Trade and industry ==
Landhi Town includes one of the four largest industrial estates in Karachi and will be the site of a new 1.0-square-kilometre (250-acre) industrial estate for small- and medium-sized businesses. The industrial estate benefits from the proximity of Port Qasim and Jinnah International Airport as well as rail and road links to the rest of Pakistan.

== See also ==
- Landhi Industrial Area
- City District Government
- Karachi
- Lahore
