= Korangi railway station =

Railway station in Pakistan

Coordinates: 24.84501°N 67.16385°E

Korangi railway station 'کورنگی ریلوے اسٹیشن

General information
- Owner: Ministry of Railways

Other information
- Station code: KRNG

History
- Former names: Great Indian Peninsula Railway
Location

Korangi railway station (Urdu: کورنگی ریلوے اسٹیشن, Sindhi: ڪورنگي ريلوي اسٽيشن) is located in Korangi Town, in Karachi, Pakistan.

== See also ==
- List of railway stations in Pakistan
- Pakistan Railways
- Korangi
- Korangi Town
- Korangi District
- Korangi J Area
- Korangi Industrial Area
- Korangi Creek Cantonment
- Korangi (disambiguation)
- Korangi railway station
