= Khoso Goth =

Khoso Goth (BBC) Benazir Bhutoo Colony
- Goth
- Interactive map of Khoso Goth (BBC) Benazir Bhutoo Colony
- Country: Pakistan
- Province: Sindh
- City: Karachi
- District: Malir
- Postal Code: 75100

Area
  - Total: 0.125 km^{2} (0.048 sq mi)

Population (2008)
  - Total: 4,000 approx

Khoso Goth also Khoso Village (Urdu: کھوسو گھوٹھ) is a suburb of Shah Faisal Town in Karachi, Sindh, Pakistan.

== History ==
Goth is a Sindhi language word meaning town. Khoso Goth was established over a century ago. Sindhi landlord (Haji Ghulam Muhammad Khoso) sold his land for housing development. There are several ethnic groups in Khoso Goth including Muhajirs, Sindhis, Punjabis, Seraikis, Pakhtuns, Baloch etc. The population of Shah Faisal Town is estimated to be nearly one million. Recently a file was moved for the leasing of this Goth New name given to this area is BBC Short Name of Benazir Bhutoo Colony. The Name after Shaheed Benazir Bhutoo. The Most famous Advocate of Supereme Court named Sardar Mahmood Anwar Hussain Baloch lives here He is also Sardar of his Tribe named Ranjhari

== Facilities ==
Facilities include Schools Mosques, Graveyard, Playground The main streets of the Town are Cemented. Street lights were also installed by the City Government. Electricity, Gas, Telephone and TV cable connections are easily available. High speed internet Broadband service is also made available. Initially there was only one Govt. school in the locality but in the recent years two Private schools named as "Iqra Paramount Grammar School" and "Ilma Public school" are also established. All the three schools are up to Metric level. For religious education two maddresses are established named as Iqra Ishat-ul-Quran and Madressa Hadiqa -Tul- Quran. The second one is being run by the Imam of Masjid-e-Abu Bakr.

== See also ==
- Karachi
- City District Government Karachi
- Malir
- Karachi International Airport
