= Iqbal Muhammad Ali Khan =

Pakistani politician (1958–2022)

Member of the National Assembly of Pakistan
- In office 13 August 2018 – 19 April 2022
- Succeeded by: Mohammad Abubakar
- Constituency: NA-240 (Korangi Karachi-II)
- In office 2002 – 31 May 2018
- Constituency: NA-256 (Karachi-XVIII)

Personal details
- Born: 1 January 1958 Karachi, Sindh, Pakistan
- Died: 19 April 2022 (aged 64) Karachi, Sindh, Pakistan
- Party: MQM (2002-2022)

Iqbal Muhammad Ali Khan (Urdu: اقبال محمد علی خان; 1 January 1958 – 19 April 2022) was a Pakistani politician who was a member of the National Assembly of Pakistan from August 2018 until his death. He had previously been a member of the National Assembly from 2002 to May 2018.

== Early life ==
Khan was born on 1 January 1958.

== Political career ==
Khan was elected to the National Assembly of Pakistan as a candidate of Muttahida Qaumi Movement (MQM) from Constituency NA-256 (Karachi-XVIII) in the 2002 Pakistani general election. He received 39,196 votes and defeated Muhammad Hasim Siddiqui, a candidate of Muttahida Majlis-e-Amal (MMA).

He was re-elected to the National Assembly as a candidate of MQM from Constituency NA-256 (Karachi-XVIII) in the 2008 Pakistani general election. He received 123,491 votes and defeated Mirza Maqbool Ahmed, a candidate of Pakistan Peoples Party (PPP).

He was re-elected to the National Assembly as a candidate of MQM from Constituency NA-256 (Karachi-XVIII) in the 2013 Pakistani general election. He received 151,788 votes and defeated Muhammad Zubair Khan, a candidate of Pakistan Tehreek-e-Insaf (PTI).

He was re-elected to the National Assembly as a candidate of MQM from Constituency NA-240 (Korangi Karachi-II) in the 2018 Pakistani general election.
