= Reta Plot =

Neighborhood in Karachi, Pakistan

Reta Plot (Urdu: ریتہ پلاٹ) is a neighbourhood in the Korangi District in eastern Karachi, Pakistan. It was previously part of Shah Faisal Town, which was an administrative unit that was disbanded in 2011. Now it is an active part of Town Municipal Corporation Shah Faisal (abbreviated as TMC Shah Faisal) is a local government administrative body situated in Karachi, Sindh, Pakistan.

There are several ethnic groups in Reta Plot including Muhajirs, Sindhis, Kashmiris, Seraikis, Pakhtuns, Balochis, Memons, Bohras, Ismailis, etc. Over 99% of the population is Muslim. The population of Shah Faisal Town is estimated to be nearly one million.
