= Hasrat Mohani Colony =

Human settlement in Pakistan

Coordinates: 24°54′N 67°01′E

Hasrat Mohani Colony (Urdu: حسرت موہانی کالونی) is a neighbourhood in the Korangi District in eastern Karachi, Pakistan. It is named after the Indian Urdu poet Maulana Hasrat Mohani.

== History ==
Hasrat Mohani Colony was formerly a union council and was part of Korangi Town, which was an administrative unit that was disbanded in 2011. Hasrat Mohani Colony Union Council consisted primarily of Hasrat Mohani Colony, Sectors 51-A, and 51-B.

== Demographics ==
It is populated predominantly by Urdu speaking Muhajirs.
