= Korangi =

Neighborhood of Karachi, Sindh, Pakistan

Coordinates: 24.838735°N 67.120898°E

Korangi (Urdu: کورنگی) is a neighborhood in Karachi, Sindh, Pakistan located within Korangi District and Landhi Town. The district is administratively divided into three towns.

== Location ==
Korangi, in eastern Karachi, is situated east and south of the Malir River. It is bordered by Faisal Cantonment and Shah Faisal Town to the north, Bin Qasim Town and Landhi Town to the east and south, Korangi Creek Cantonment to the southwest, and Jamshed Town to the west, across the Malir River.

== Facilities ==
Korangi is home to several hospitals, including Indus Hospital, Chiniot Hospital, East-Side Hospital, Rahmatullah Benevolent Eye Hospital (Korangi 2½), Chiniot General Hospital (Korangi 2), Government Hospital (Korangi 5), and Doctor Sultan Hospital (Korangi 4). Korangi is a town having markets at Korangi 2, 4, 6 and mobile market at Korangi 4. Some famous schools are Nasra School, the Educators, the Smart School, Sarfraz Pilot School, Habib Academy, Modern English School, and White Rose School. Some sports ground including Nasim Hameed Sports Complex at Korangi 5 are the progressive part of Korangi. The population of Korangi Town was estimated to be about 800,000 in 2012. Korangi has food streets in Korangi 2, and 4 and a restaurant named Jahanzaib Haleem.

== Demographics ==
There are several ethnic groups in Korangi including Muhajirs, Sindhis, Punjabis, Kashmiris, Seraikis, Pakhtuns, Hazara Hindko Speaking Balochis, Memons, Bengali, Gilgiti, Balti, Tamils, Hindus, and Christians. The population of Korangi Town was estimated to be about 550,000 in 1998, 800,000 in 2010. A new bridge (2009) at the Drigh Road connects Korangi with Shahrah-e-Faisal.

== Korangi Township ==
Korangi Township was established in 1959.

== Korangi Industrial Area ==
The Korangi Industrial Area (KIA) is one of the largest industrial areas in Pakistan. Major industries operating in the area include Getz Pharma, Indus Pharma, Martin Dow, AGI, AGM, Afroze Chemicals, Abbott Pharma, and Reliable Paints Industry.

Reliable Paints Industry is a paint and coatings manufacturer located in Korangi, Karachi, and is listed as a member of the Pakistan Coating Association.

The Karachi Electric Supply Company's (K-E) 220 MW Korangi Combined Cycle Power Plant is also located in the Korangi Industrial Area.

== Korangi Creek ==
On the eastern side of Karachi—between Karachi and Keti Bandar - the area extending from Korangi to Rehri Creek at the north-eastern side is known as the Korangi Creek which further extends to Phitti, Gizri, Khuddi, Khai, Pitiani, Dobbo, Sisa, Hajamro, Turshian and Khobar creeks. Korangi – Phitti is an area of about 64,000 hectares which is just over one-tenth of the tidal area of the Indus River Delta. It comprises dense mangroves and tidal creeks, mud flats, and sand. The distance between Bundal to Gharo, the farthest end is about 51 kilometres (32 miles) .

== Korangi Creek Industrial Park ==
Korangi Creek Industrial Park is located in Karachi, Sindh, Pakistan. Korangi Creek Industrial Park is built over an area of 100 hectares (250 acres), this industrial zone is located in Korangi Creek Cantonment. It is located in Sector 38, Korangi Industrial Area, Karachi, Sindh. The project cost at 3.3 billion.

== Korangi Creek Cantonment ==
Korangi Creek Cantonment is a military cantonment in Korangi in city of Karachi, in Sindh, Pakistan.

== See also ==
- Faisal Cantonment
- Ibrahim Hyderi
- Landhi Town
- Korangi
- Korangi Town
- Korangi District
- Korangi J Area
- Korangi Industrial Area
- Korangi Creek Cantonment
- Korangi (disambiguation)
- Korangi railway station
