= Bilal Colony =

Neighborhood in Karachi, Pakistan

Coordinates: 33°39′N 73°05′E

Bilal Colony (Urdu: بلال کالونی) is a neighbourhood in the Korangi municipality of Karachi, Pakistan It was part of the Korangi Town borough until that was disbanded in 2011.

== Healthcare ==
The stink and other adverse effects from the tanneries and a refinery have polluted the environment of the nearby villages. The inhabitants of Bilal Colony are exposed to associated health risks.
