= Zaman Town =

Neighbourhood in Korangi, Karachi

Zaman Town زمان ٹاؤن Gulshan-e-Hali
- Municipality
- Interactive map of Zaman Town
- Coordinates: 24°49′58″N 67°9′9″E
- Country: Pakistan
- Province: Sindh
- City: Karachi
- Postal code: 74900

Zaman Town (Urdu: زمان ٹاؤن), also known as Gulshan-e-Hali, is a neighbourhood in the Korangi District in eastern Karachi, Pakistan. It was previously part of Korangi Town, which was an administrative unit that was disbanded in 2011.

Zaman Town has the postal code 74900 and features several notable landmarks, including Owais Shaheed Park, Jamia Masjid Tayyaba, and the local Union Council office.

The area is recognized for its educational facilities, with more than 50 schools operating in the locality. Prominent institutions include The Educators, The Smart School, The Spearhead Academy, Genius Cambridge School, Iqra University Schooling System, The Kent City School, Babaza Foundation, and The Spirit School. Religious education is also offered at a local Quran Academy.

Zaman Town includes a food street frequented by residents and visitors.

== Neighbourhoods ==
- Zaman Town
- Labour Square
- Bengali Para
- Sector 34
- Area 1
- Area 2
- Area 3
