= PAF Airmen Academy Korangi Creek =

Training institute

Coordinates: 24.7830°N 67.1345°E

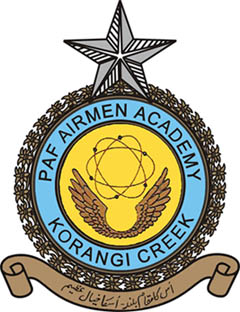
- Logo of PAF Airmen Academy
- Motto: اس کامقام بلند،اس کاخیال عظیم(Urdu)
- Type: Military Academy
- Established: 2019
- AOC: AVM Imran Majid, SI(M)
- Location: Korangi, Sindh, Pakistan
- Nick Name: Home of Airmen

Pakistan Air Force Airmen Academy Korangi Creek (PAAK) is called the "Home of Airmen" of the Pakistan Air Force. It was a PAF base which used to impart only technical training to Aero Apprentices and training of non-technical crafts was conducted at other PAF bases. The PAF needed to train all airmen at one place and in 2019, the academy was established for imparting training of all trades at one institution.

To mark the historic event of setting the foundation stone of the Pakistan Air Force Airmen Academy, a ceremony was held in which Air Chief Marshal Mujahid Anwar Khan, Chief of the Air Staff Pakistan Air Force unveiled the plaque of this unique institution. Addressing at the occasion, the Air Chief said that PAF has always focused on imparting quality training to the airmen, who are considered to be the backbone of PAF human resource. He further said that existing airmen training model needed revamping to make it at par with PAF Academy Asghar Khan, which is a premier training institution of officers’ cadre. He added that in this centralized institution, airmen of various trades and expertise would be trained in technical and non-technical disciplines under one umbrella. The Air Chief reiterated his resolve of making it a reputed institution which would also offer quality training to the airmen from friendly air forces. High ranking civil and defence forces officers and a large number of PAF personnel attended the ceremony.
