= Hundred Quarters =

Neighbourhood in Karachi, Pakistan

Hundred Quarters (Urdu: سو کوارٹرز) is a neighbourhood in the Korangi District in eastern Karachi, Pakistan. It was previously part of Korangi Town, which was an administrative unit that was disbanded in 2011. There are one hundred houses (also known as quarters) in this neighbourhood. It is divided into many sectors such as sector D-AREA, E- AREA, B-AREA C-AREA.

== Demographics ==
It is a Muhajirs majority area.
