= Korangi (disambiguation) =

Korangi is a human settlement in Sindh, Pakistan.

Korangi may also refer to:

== In Pakistan ==
- Korangi Creek Cantonment, a cantonment in Pakistan.
- Korangi Creek Industrial Park, an industrial park in Pakistan
- Korangi District, an administrative unit of Sindh, Pakistan
- Korangi Industrial Area, an industrial area near Karachi, Pakistan
- Korangi J Area, a town near Karachi, Pakistan
- Korangi railway station, a railway station in Pakistan
- Korangi Town, a town in Pakistan
- Korangi District, a district in Sindh, Pakistan

== Other places ==
- Coringa, East Godavari district, a village in Andhra Pradesh, India, also known as Koringa

== See also ==
- Coringa (disambiguation)
