= Al-Falah Society =

Neighbourhood of Karachi, Pakistan

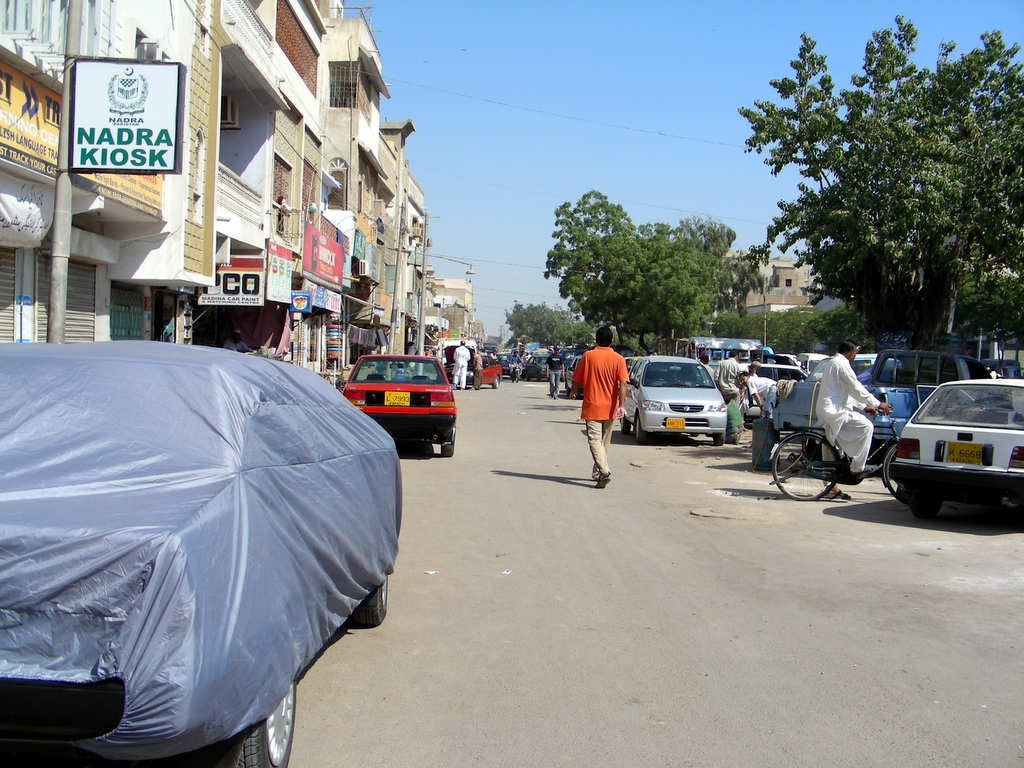
Alfalah Society, Shah Faisal Town, Karachi

Al-Falah Housing Society (Urdu: الفلاح سوسائٹی) is a neighbourhood in the Korangi District in eastern Karachi, Pakistan. It was previously part of Shah Faisal Town, which was an administrative unit that was disbanded in 2011.

Alfalah Society is striped residential area aside by Railway lines, starts from Malir Halt to Malir No.15 Stop (Malir Court), There are several ethnic groups in Shah Faisal Town including Muhajirs, Sindhis, Punjabis, Kashmiris, Seraikis, Pakhtuns, Balochis, Memons, Bohras, Ismailis, etc. Over 99% of the population is Muslim. The population of Shah Faisal Town is estimated to be nearly one million.

There is a railway station "Malir Station" the residents of the town access this the junction to catch trains for their en route. Jamia Millia Education Institution in This Area, also various Eating Places located there.

== See also ==
- Moinabad
