= Mohammad Abubakar =

Pakistani politician

Member of the National Assembly of Pakistan
- In office 22 June 2022 – 10 August 2023
- Preceded by: Iqbal Muhammad Ali Khan
- Constituency: NA-240 (Korangi Karachi-II)

Personal details
- Born: Karachi, Sindh, Pakistan
- Party: PMLN (2025-present)
- Other political affiliations: MQM-P (2022-2025)

Mohammad Abubakar is a Pakistani politician who had been a member of the National Assembly of Pakistan from June 2022 till August 2023.

== Political career ==
He was elected to the National Assembly of Pakistan from Constituency NA-240 (Korangi Karachi-II) as a candidate of Muttahida Qaumi Movement – Pakistan in a by-election held on 16 June 2022.
