= Aftab Siddiqui =

Pakistani politician

Member of the National Assembly of Pakistan
- In office 29 October 2018 – 17 January 2023
- Constituency: NA-247 (Karachi South-II)

President of PTI Karachi
- In office 16 February 2023 – 18 May 2023
- Chairman: Imran Khan
- Preceded by: Bilal Ahmed Ghaffar
- Succeeded by: Akram Cheema

Personal details
- Born: Karachi, Sindh, Pakistan
- Other political affiliations: PTI (2018-2023)

Aftab Hussain Siddiqui (Urdu: آفتاب حسین صدیقی) is a Pakistani politician who had been a member of the National Assembly of Pakistan from October 2018 till January 2023. He had secured a seat vacant by incumbent President of Pakistan, Arif Alvi.

== Political career ==
He was elected to the National Assembly of Pakistan from Constituency NA-247 (Karachi South-II) as a candidate of Pakistan Tehreek-e-Insaf in a by-election held on 21 October 2018.

On 18 May 2023, he left the PTI due to the 2023 Pakistani protests.

== More Reading ==
- List of members of the 15th National Assembly of Pakistan
