= Drigh Colony =

Residential neighbourhood in Karachi

Coordinates: 24°53′N 67°09′E

Drigh Colony (Urdu: ڈرگ کالونی) is a neighbourhood in the Korangi District in eastern Karachi, Pakistan. It is part of Shah Faisal Subdivision.

== Demographics ==
There are several ethnic groups in Shah Faisal Town including Muhajirs, Sindhis, Punjabis, Kashmiris, Seraikis, Pakhtuns, Balochis, Memons, Bohras, Ismailis and Christians.

== History ==
Drigh Village Refugee Colony is currently known as Shah Faisal Colony. It was part of Shah Faisal Town which was an administrative unit that was disbanded in 2011.
