= Gulzar Colony =

Residential neighbourhood in Korangi Town, Karachi, Pakistan

Coordinates: 31°38′N 74°17′E

Gulzar Colony (Urdu: گلزار کالونی) is a residential neighbourhood in the Korangi District in eastern Karachi, Pakistan. Gulzar Colony population is approx 50 thousands people live in this area most of the people are labour whose work in factory area of Gulzar Colony.It is a part of Korangi Town,

== Factories ==
- National Refinery Limited
