= Natha Khan Goth =

Neighbourhood of Karachi, Pakistan

Natha Khan Goth (Urdu: نتھا خان گوٹھ) is a neighbourhood in the Korangi District in eastern Karachi, Pakistan. It was previously part of Shah Faisal Town, which was an administrative unit that was disbanded in 2011.

There are several ethnic groups in Natha Khan Goth including Hazarewal, Muhajirs, Sindhis, Kashmiris, Seraikis, Pakhtuns, Balochis, Memons, Bohras, Ismailis, etc.
