= Akram Cheema =

Pakistani politician

Member of the National Assembly of Pakistan
- In office 13 August 2018 – 29 July 2022
- Constituency: NA-239 (Korangi Karachi-I)

President of PTI Karachi
- In office 24 May 2023 – 28 June 2023
- Chairman: Imran Khan
- Preceded by: Aftab Siddiqui
- Succeeded by: Khurrum Sher Zaman

Personal details
- Born: Karachi, Sindh, Pakistan
- Party: JIP (2025-present)
- Other political affiliations: PTI (2018-2025)

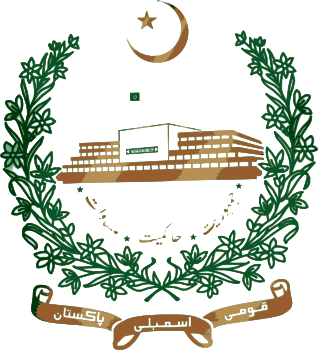
Emblem of National Assembly of Pakistan

Muhammad Akram Cheema (محمد اکرم چیمہ) is a Pakistani politician who had been a member of the National Assembly of Pakistan from August 2018 till July 2022.

== Political career ==
He was elected to the National Assembly of Pakistan from Constituency NA-239 (Korangi Karachi-I) as a candidate of Pakistan Tehreek-e-Insaf in the 2018 Pakistani general election.

=== Resignation ===
On 10 April 2022, because of the regime change of Imran Khan's government, he resigned from the National Assembly on the orders of Imran Khan. The new government did not accept the resignations of many members for fear of deteriorating the number of members. However, accepting the resignations of eleven members on 28 July 2022, one of them was Akram Cheema. Later, by-elections were held again on his seat, Imran Khan made a surprising move to stand on his own in all the by-seats.

== See also ==
- List of members of the 15th National Assembly of Pakistan
