= Coringa =

Coringa may refer to:

== Australia ==
- Coringa, Queensland, a locality in the North Burnett Region
- Coringa-Herald National Nature Reserve, Coral Sea Islands Territory

== India ==
- Alternative spelling of Koringa River, near the Yanam
- Kakinada (formerly Coringa), city in Andhra Pradesh, India
- Coringa Wildlife Sanctuary, Andhra Pradesh
- Coringa, East Godavari district, a village in Andhra Pradesh

== Brazil ==
- Portuguese for the DC Comic's villain The Joker

== See also ==
- Korangi (disambiguation)
