= Chakra Goth =

Area of Karachi, Pakistan

Coordinates: 24°49′N 67°08′E

Chakra Goth (Urdu: چکرا گوٹھ) is a neighbourhood in the Korangi District in eastern Karachi, Pakistan. It was previously part of Korangi Town, a former administrative unit that was disbanded in 2011.

The several ethnic groups residing in Chakra Goth include Muhajirs, Punjabis, Sindhis, Kashmiris, Seraikis, Pakhtuns, Balochis, Bengalis, Memons, Bohras, Ismailis, Rohingyas, etc. The population is predominantly Muslim. Large numbers of Bengalis from Bangladesh, and Rohingyas from Myanmar have settled in this neighbourhood.

The neighborhood has been gang fighting in which 3 Sindh Reserve Police officers were killed.

== See also ==
- Ittehad Colony
- Bengalis in Pakistan
- Burmese people in Pakistan
