= Nasir Colony =

Human settlement in Pakistan

Coordinates: 24°49′N 67°08′E

Nasir Colony (Urdu: ناصر کالونی) is a neighbourhood in the Korangi District in eastern Karachi, Pakistan. It was previously part of Korangi Town, which was an administrative unit that was disbanded in 2011.

There are several ethnic groups in Nasir Colony including Muhajirs, Punjabis, Sindhis, Kashmiris, Seraikis, Pakhtuns, Balochis, Memons, Christians, Bohras and Ismailis.

Nasir Colony has two large mosques, one church, and one football pitch. Its football club's name is Nasir Sports Football Club.

Maps of Karachi: For accurate depiction of Nasir Colony's location within Korangi District.
