= Korangi Sector 33 =

Neighbourhood of Karachi, Pakistan

Korangi Sector 33 (Urdu: کورنگی) is a neighbourhood in the Korangi District in eastern Karachi, Pakistan. It was previously part of Korangi Town, which was an administrative unit that was disbanded in 2011. The area is divided into six further townships: 33/A, 33/B, 33/C, 33/D, 33/E, and 33/F.

33/A, is the main and biggest area of Sector 33 it comprises the main Markets, Banks, Hospitals, Restaurants, Hotels, Electronic Market and other businesses and is the center business hub of Korangi.

The housing schemes of 33/B, 33/C, D, and F, comprising 60 and 80 square yard houses, were primarily allotted to working class strata of Karachi.

However, 33/E was allotted to Pakistan Navy's employees. 33/A and 33/E are the only scheme in Sector 33 which has 120 square yards for each house. Second, the lanes and streets of 33/A and 33/E are wider properly laid plains which attracted upper-middle and middle-class people from the neighboring areas.

== Neighbourhoods ==
- Sector A, Sector B, Sector C, C Area, O Area, and Q Area P Area

== Demographics ==
Majority of people living in this area are Urdu-speaking Muhajirs.
