= Qayyumabad =

Coordinates: 34°29′N 72°29′E

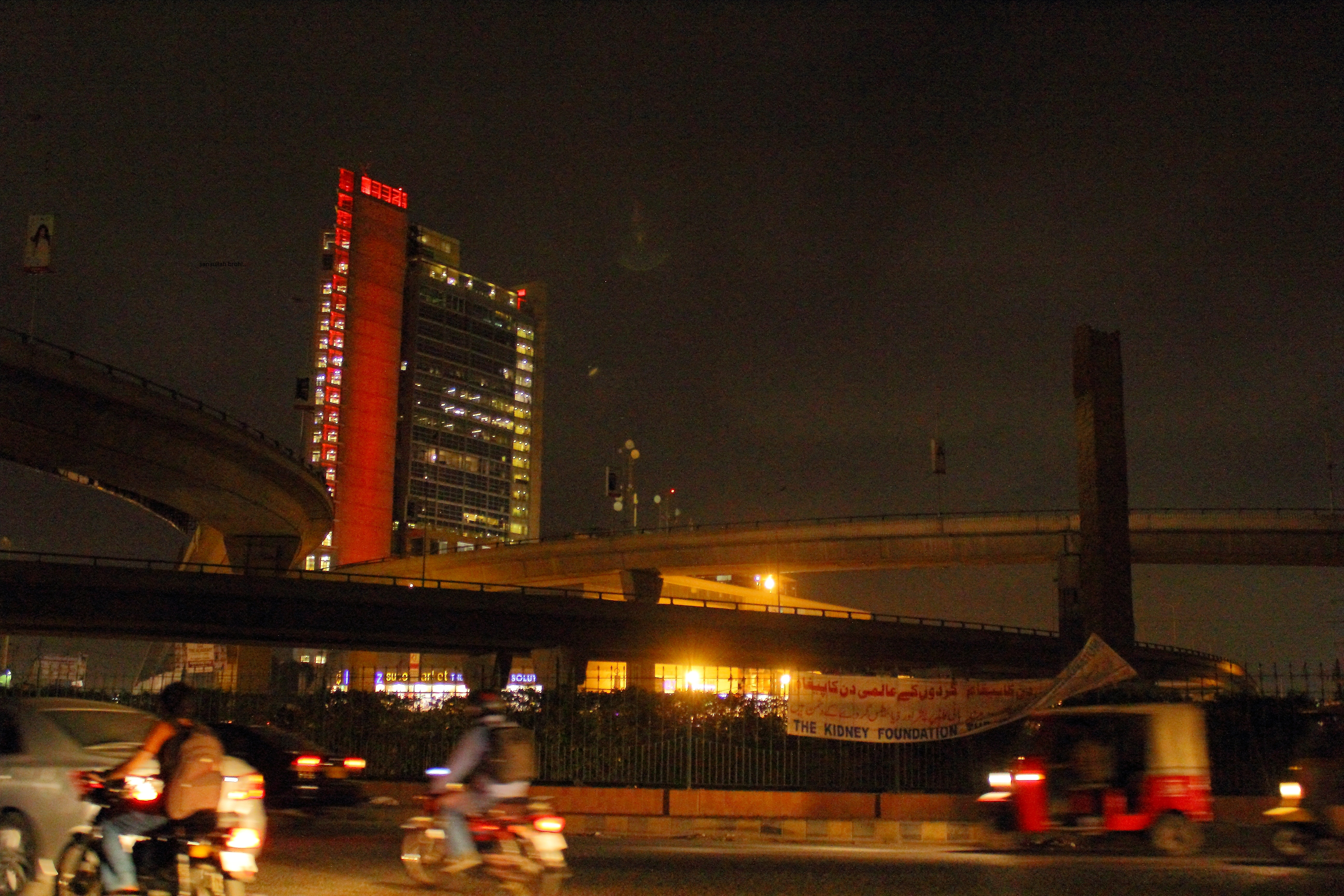
Qayyumabad Bridge

Qayyumabad (Urdu: قیوم آباد) is a suburb of Korangi Town in Karachi, Sindh, Pakistan. Confined within 109 acres, Qayyumabad is one of the most densely populated and polluted residential areas of Karachi. It is home to more than 70,000 people — including Pakhtun, Punjabi, Sindhi, Baloch and Urdu-speaking ethnicities, as well as Christians and scheduled caste Hindus. A report by Dawn suggests that DHA has illegally grabbed 53 acres belonging to Qayyumabad.

Qayyumabad is named after Begum Qayyum.
