= Pak Sadat Colony =

Neighbourhood in Korangi District, Karachi, Pakistan

Pak Sadat Colony (Urdu: پاک سادات کالونی) is a neighbourhood in the Korangi District in eastern Karachi, Pakistan. It was previously part of Shah Faisal Town, which was an administrative unit that was disbanded in 2011.

There are several ethnic groups in Pak Sadat Colony including Muhajirs, Sindhis, Kashmiris, Seraikis, Pakhtuns, Balochis, Memons, Bohras and Ismailis.

== See also ==
- Shah Faisal Town
- Sadat Colony
- Karachi
