= Mirza Iqbal Baig =

Pakistani sports journalist

- مرزا اقبال بیگ
- Education: University of Karachi (BSc) (MSc)
- Occupations: TV host Sports journalist Cricket analyst Commentator
- Employer: Express News (2014-present)
- Television: Bolain Kya Baat Hai; Sports Page with Mirza Iqbal Baig

Mirza Iqbal Baig (Urdu: مرزا اقبال بیگ) is a Pakistani sports journalist, analyst, and cricket commentator who currently works as a television show host. Baig comes from Karachi and is a notable resident of the Model Colony. He has served in various capacities as a cricket analyst, including being appointed by the Pakistan Cricket Board as a media coordinator in 1999 from the National Stadium, Karachi. Currently, he hosts a sports show on Express News and writes for the Daily Times.

== Education ==
Baig studied at the University of Karachi hold a BSc. Honours degree in Economics with his subsidiary subjects being mathematics and statistics. He then went on to do M.Sc. in Economics from the same university. For a short period, he remained a teacher of mathematics and physics, before eventually venturing into the commentating sphere, something he had always been interested in.

== Career ==
He started his career in 1987 by working as a sports reporter for Radio Pakistan, after being introduced there by his friend Tauseef Ahmed (a former Pakistani test cricketer). Initially, he was assigned a sports program called Aalmi Sports Roundup where gave a recap of world sports. He then moved on to cricket-related news. In 1988, he joined Daily Jang as a sports editor. He then worked for Takbeer (magazine), Ummat as well as the Daily Times and later joined Indus TV as a freelance sports anchor.

In 1999, he was appointed by the Pakistan Cricket Board as a media coordinator from Karachi in 1999, a position he stayed at for three years.

In the mid-2000s, Baig joined Geo Super as host of a sports talk show Bolain Kya Baat Hai on Geo Super, where he went on to do more than 700 episodes. Baig was in conflict with the management of Geo Super so he left Geo Super after six and a half years and shook joined PTV Sports in August 2012. In 2014, he joined Express News as host of Sports Hour. In 2015, the show was renamed to Sports Page with Mirza Iqbal Baig, and, as of 2022, is still in production.

Since February 2016, Baig has been writing for the Daily Times.

== Awards ==
In 2021, Baig was nominated for the Best Sports Show Host award at the 2nd Pakistan Sports Awards.
