= Syed Asif Husnain =

Pakistani politician

Member of the National Assembly of Pakistan
- In office 2008 – 31 May 2018
- Constituency: NA-255 (Karachi-XVII)

Personal details
- Party: MQM-P (2023-present)
- Other political affiliations: PSP (2016-2023); MQM-L (2008-2016)

Syed Asif Husnain (Urdu: سید آصف حسنین) is a Pakistani politician who is currently a member of Pak Sarzameen Party.

He was a member of the National Assembly of Pakistan from 2008 to May 2018.

== Political career ==
=== Working for MQM ===
He was elected to the National Assembly of Pakistan as a candidate of Muttahida Qaumi Movement (MQM) from Constituency NA-255 (Karachi-XVII) in the 2008 Pakistani general election. He received 157,971 votes and defeated Haji Nafees Ahmed Usmani, a candidate of Pakistan Peoples Party (PPP).

He was re-elected to the National Assembly as a candidate of MQM from Constituency NA-255 (Karachi-XVII) in the 2013 Pakistani general election. He received 136,982 votes and defeated Khalid Mehmood Ali, a candidate of Pakistan Tehreek-e-Insaf (PTI).

=== Joining PSP ===
In 2016, he left MQM to join Pak Sarzameen Party and announced to resign from National Assembly as well. In 2017, it was reported that Husnain was still holding seat at National Assembly and drawing salary, despite quitting MQM in August 2016 on whose ticket he had won the seat. Husnain was criticised by Farooq Sattar for continuing to hold the seat of National Assembly that he had won on MQM ticket.
