= Mustafa Taj Colony =

Neighborhood in Pakistan

Mustafa Taj Colony (Urdu: مصطفى تاج کالونی) is a neighbourhood in the Korangi District in eastern Karachi, Pakistan. It was previously part of Korangi Town, which was an administrative unit that was disbanded in 2011.

== Neighbourhoods ==
- Rahimabad
- Mustafa Taj Colony
- Sectors 48-B and 48-F

== Demographics ==
Majority of people living in this area are Sindhi & Urdu-speaking (Pakistan)|Muhajirs]].
