= Korangi Town =

Residential town within the city of Karachi, Pakistan

Korangi Town کورنگی ٹاؤن
- Constituent Town of Karachi
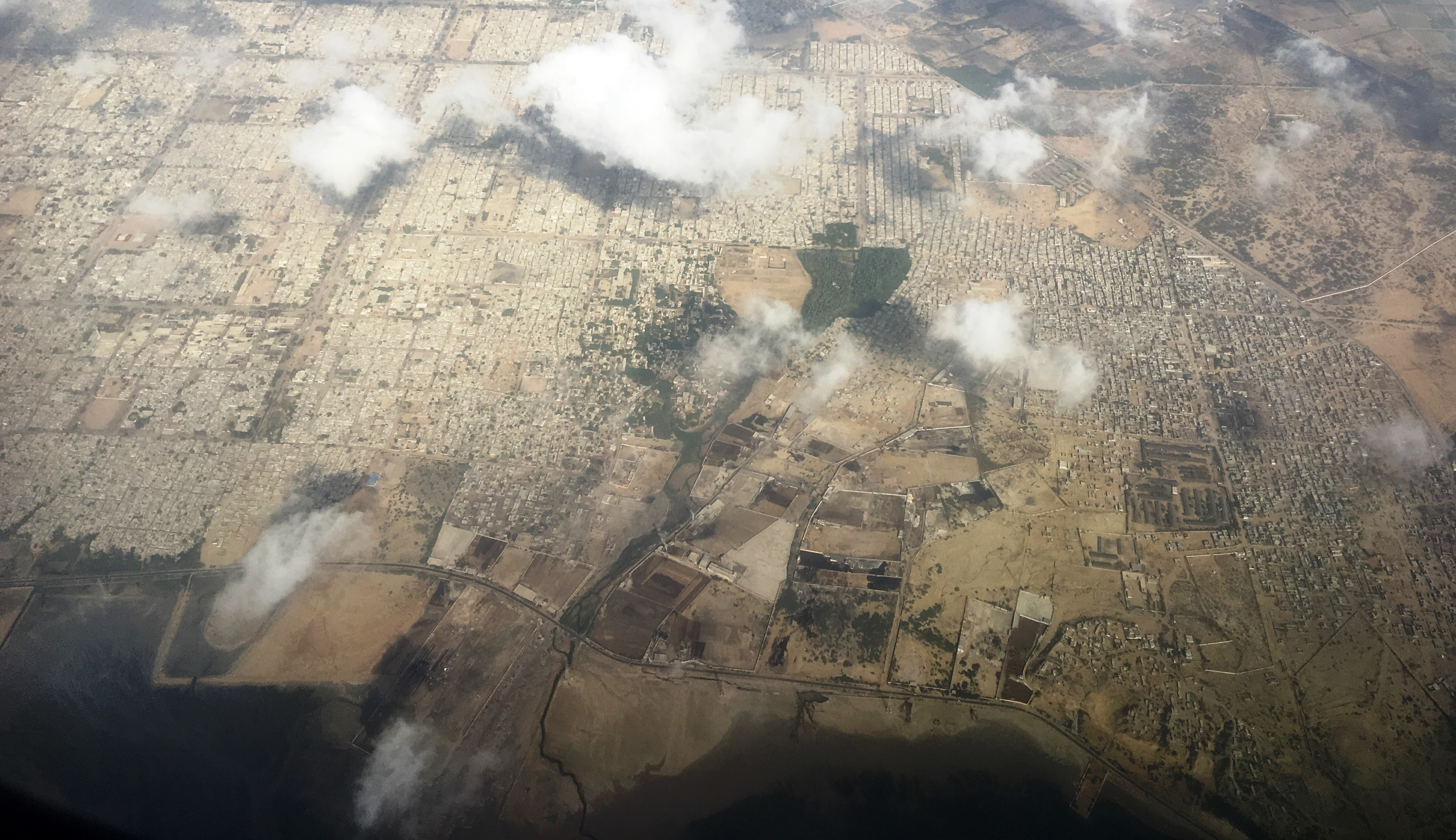
- Aerial view of (Ibrahim Hyderi)

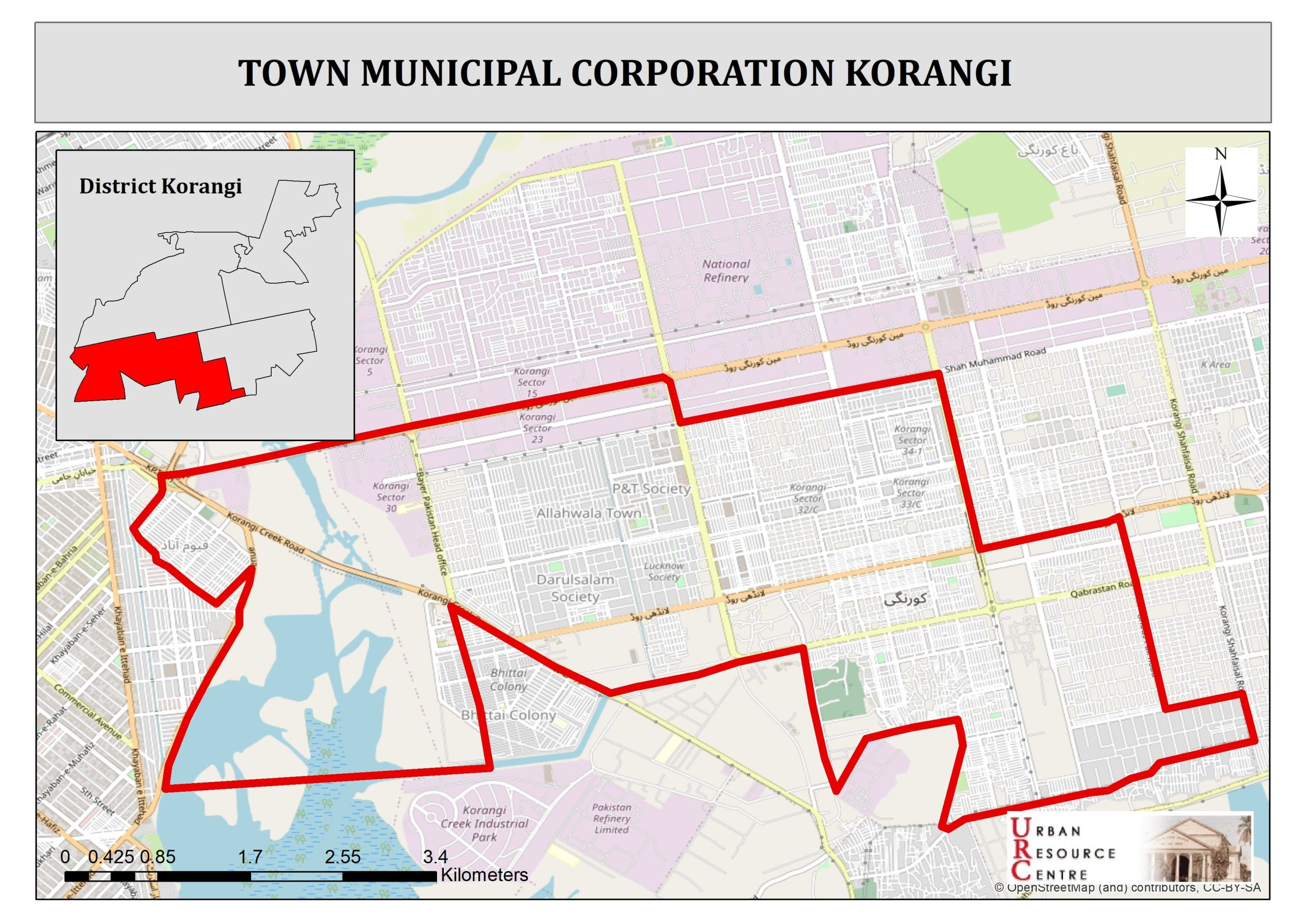
- Korangi Town Map
- Country: Pakistan
- Province: Sindh
- District: Korangi District
- Division: Karachi Division
- Town Chairman: Muhammad Nadeem Sheikh
- Established: 1972; 54 years ago
- Town status: 14 August 2001; 25 years ago
- Disbanded: 11 July 2011; 15 years ago
- Part of District Karachi East: (1972-2013)
- Union Committees in Town Municipal Corporation: 11: Qayyumabad Makhdoom Bilawal Nasir Colony Zia Colony Sector-33 Korangi Raheemabad Madina Colony Ithad Colony Ghousia Colony Chakra Goth

Government
  - Type: Government of Karachi
  - Constituency: NA-234 Karachi Korangi-III

Area
  - Total: 59 km^{2} (23 sq mi)
- Elevation: 9 m (30 ft)
- Highest elevation: 31 m (102 ft)
- Lowest elevation: −3 m (−9.8 ft)

Population (2023 Pakistani census)
  - Total: 1,362,998
  - Density: 23,118.51/km^{2} (59,876.7/sq mi)
- Demonym: Karachiite
- Time zone: UTC+05:00 (PKT)
  - Summer (DST): DST is not observed
- ZIP Code: 74900
- NWD (area) code: 021
- ISO 3166 code: PK-SD

Korangi Town (Urdu: کورنگی ٹاؤن) is an administrative subdivision or town within Karachi, Pakistan.

== Town Municipal Committee ==
As per the Sindh Local Government Act, 2021, Sindh government replaced the previous seven District Municipal Corporations (DMCs) with 26 towns, each with its own municipal committee. Korangi District has four towns.

- Shah Faisal Town
- Landhi Town
- Korangi Town
- Model Colony Town, Karachi

== History ==
It lies in the eastern part of the city that was named after the locality of Korangi. Korangi Town was re-organized as part of Karachi East District, before Korangi District was formed. According to the 2023 Pakistani census, the population of Korangi Subdivision is 1,362,998 (1.3 million).

The federal government introduced local government reforms in the year 2000, which eliminated the previous "third tier of government" (administrative divisions) and replaced it with the fourth tier (districts). The effect in Karachi was the dissolution of the former Karachi Division, and the merging of its five districts to form a new Karachi City-District with eighteen autonomous constituent towns including Korangi Town. In 2011, the system was disbanded but remained in place for bureaucratic administration until 2015, when the Karachi Metropolitan Corporation system was reintroduced. In 2015, Korangi Town was re-organized as part of Karachi East, before it was made part of Korangi District.

== Demographics ==
Languages of Korangi sub-division (2023 Pakistani census)
1. Urdu (60.2%)
2. Punjabi (11.3%)
3. Sindhi (7.77%)
4. Pashto (6.30%)
5. Saraiki (4.27%)
6. Hindko (2.99%)
7. Balochi (0.69%)
8. Others (6.48%)

Korangi subdivision has a population of 1,293,017 among which There are 821,192 Urdu, 153,738 Punjabi, 105,186 Sindhi, 85,954 Pashto, 58,218 Saraiki, 40,882 Hindko, 9,418 Balochi, 5,422 Mewati, 4,218 Balti, 3,677 Shina, 3,446 Kashmiri, 975 Brahvi, 657 Koshistani, 34 Kalasha and 69,981 others.

== Hospital and healthcare ==
- Indus Hospital
- LRBT Free Tertiary Eye Hospital Korangi
- Sultan General Hospital Korangi
- Chiniot General Hospital Korangi

== Universities ==
- United Medical & Dental College
- Shaheed Zulfiqar Ali Bhutto University of Law

== Neighbourhoods of Korangi Town ==
Note: Korangi Town should not be confused with Korangi neighbourhood in neighbouring Landhi Town.

- Bilal Colony
- Chakra Goth
- Gulzar Colony
- Hasrat Mohani Colony
- Hundred Quarters
- Allahwala Town
- Gulshan-e-Mehran
- Korangi Sector 33
- Mustafa Taj Colony
- Nasir Colony
- Zaman Town
- Bhittai Colony
- Qayyumabad

== See also ==
- Korangi
- Korangi District
- Korangi J Area
- Korangi Industrial Area
- Korangi Creek Cantonment
- Korangi (disambiguation)
- Korangi railway station
