= Moria Khan Goth =

Neighbourhood in Karachi, Pakistan

Moria Khan Goth (Urdu: موریا خان گوٹھ) is a neighbourhood in the Korangi District in eastern Karachi, Pakistan. It was previously part of Shah Faisal Town, which was an administrative unit that was disbanded in 2011.

There are several ethnic groups in Moria Khan Goth including Muhajirs, Sindhis, Kashmiris, Seraikis, Pakhtuns, Balochis, Memons
