= Landhi Town =

Residential town within the city of Karachi, Pakistan

Landhi Town لانڈھی ٹاؤن
- Constituent Town of Karachi
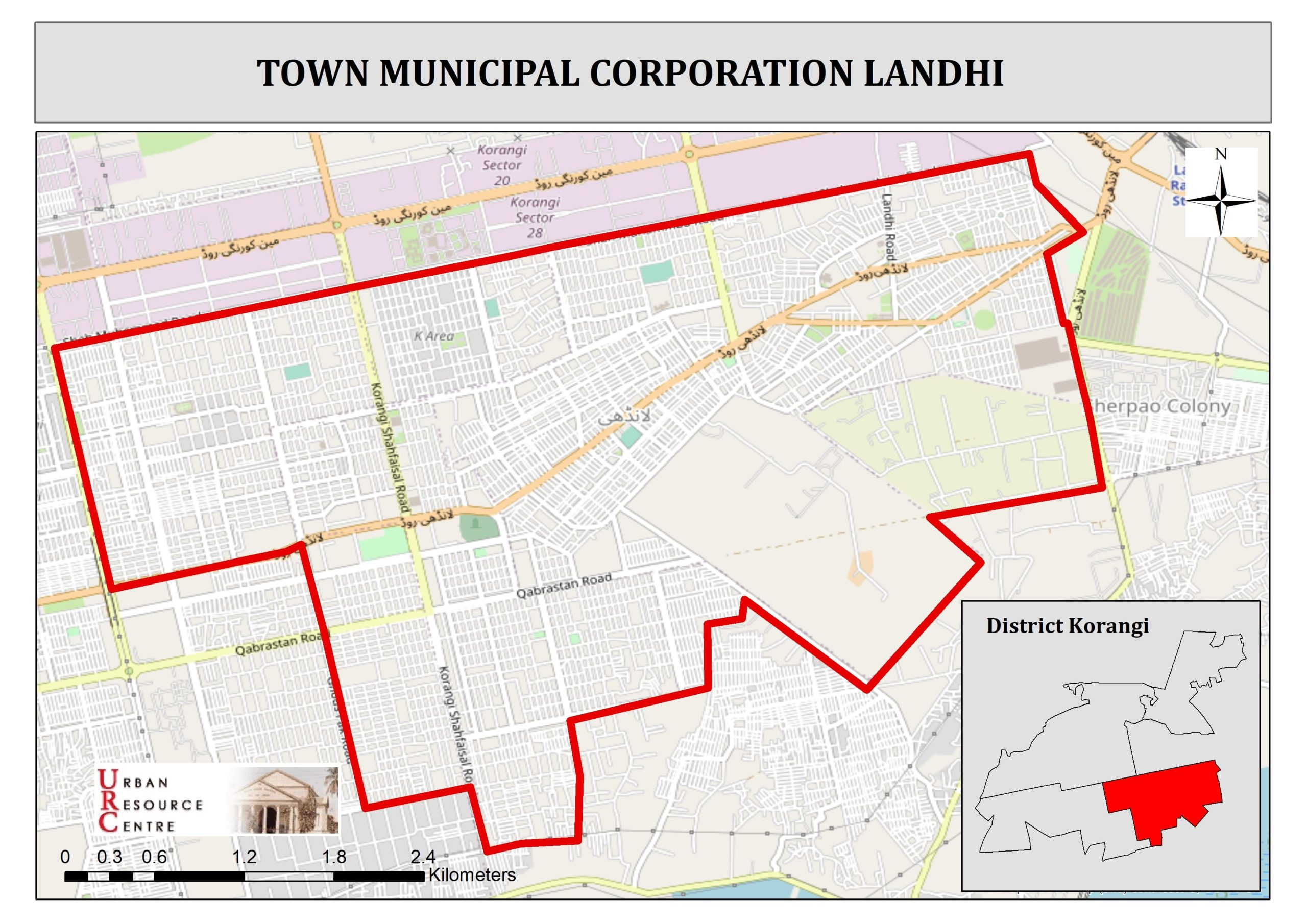
- Landhi Town Map
- Town Chairman: Abdul Jamil Khan
- District: Korangi District
- Division: Karachi Division
- Province: Sindh
- Country: Pakistan
- Established: 1972; 54 years ago
- Town status: 14 August 2001; 25 years ago
- Disbanded: 11 July 2011; 15 years ago
- Union Committees in Town Municipal Corporation: 10: Labour Square Zaman Town Sharif Colony Khawaja Ajmair Bhutto Nagar Farooq Villas Zamanabad Hasrat Mohani Colony Nizam-e-Mustafa Colony 100 Quarters

Government
  - Type: Government of Karachi
  - Constituency: NA-233 Karachi Korangi-II

Area
  - Total: 19 km^{2} (7.3 sq mi)
- Elevation: 13 m (43 ft)

Population (2023 Pakistani census)
  - Total: 681,293
  - Density: 35,857.58/km^{2} (92,870.7/sq mi)
- Demonym: Karachiite
- Time zone: UTC+05:00 (PKT)
  - Summer (DST): DST is not observed
- ZIP Code: 75160
- NWD (area) code: 021
- ISO 3166 code: PK-SD

Landhi Town (Urdu: لانڈھی ٹاؤن) is a Karachi borough in eastern Karachi that was named after the locality of Landhi.

== Town Municipal Committee ==
As per the Sindh Local Government Act, 2021, Sindh government replaced the previous seven District Municipal Corporations (DMCs) with 26 towns, each with its own municipal committee. Korangi District has four towns.

- Shah Faisal Town
- Landhi Town
- Korangi Town
- Model Colony Town, Karachi

== Location ==
It is bordered by the Faisal Cantonment and Shah Faisal Town to the north across the Malir River, Bin Qasim Town to the south and east, and Korangi Town to the west. The population of Landhi Town was estimated to be over 660,000 at the 1998 census, of which 99% are Muslim. Muhajirs constitute an overwhelming majority of the population, followed by Pashtuns, Sindhi and Baloch.

== History ==
Landhi Town was formed in 2001, and subdivided into 9 union councils. The town system was disbanded in 2011 but restored in 2022 and Korangi Town was re-organized as part of Karachi East District, before Korangi District was formed. According to the 2023 Pakistani census, the population of Landhi Subdivision is 681,293.

Landhi Town contained much of the oldest parts of Karachi. The federal government under Pervez Musharraf, who seized power in a 1999 coup d'état, introduced local government reforms in the year 2000, which eliminated the previous "third tier of government" (administrative divisions) and replaced it with the fourth tier (districts). The effect in Karachi was the dissolution of the former Karachi Division, and the merging of its five districts to form a new Karachi City-District with eighteen autonomous constituent towns including Landhi Town. Despite being abolished in 2011, the system was nevertheless used for administrative purposes up to 2015, when the Karachi Metropolitan Corporation system was reintroduced. In 2015, Landhi Town was re-organized as part of Karachi East, before it was made part of Korangi District.

== Demographics ==
Languages of Landhi sub-division (2023 Pakistani census)
1. Urdu (86.7%)
2. Sindhi (3.40%)
3. Punjabi (2.70%)
4. Pashto (1.58%)
5. Hindko (1.00%)
6. Saraiki (0.62%)
7. Others (3.97%)

There are 681,293 people of which 590,988 spoke Urdu, 22,953 Sindhi, 18,370 Punjabi, 10,812 Pashto, 6,813 Hindko, 4,257 Saraiki, 2,404 Shina, 1,988 Balochi, 1,934 Balti, 617 Kashmiri and 20,157 others.

== Neighbourhoods ==
- Awami Colony
- Bhutto Nagar is named after former Prime Minister Zulfikar Ali Bhutto, a Sindhi.
- Sher Pao Colony
- Dawood Chowrangi
- Khawaja Ajmeer Colony is named after Khwaja Moinuddin Chishti of Ajmer.
- Burmee Colony is named for the Rohingya refugees who hail from Myanmar (formerly Burma).
- Korangi lies on the eastern side of Karachi between Karachi and Keti Bandar – the area extending from Korangi to Rehri Creek.
- Landhi is home to Babar Market, one of Asia's largest open air markets. Landhi railway station is also located in this area.
- Moinabad
- Muslimabad
- Majeed Colony
- Old Muzafarabad
- Sharafi Goth
- Sherabad

== See also ==
- Landhi Industrial Area
- City District Government
- Karachi
- Lahore
