= Hotel Metropole, Karachi =

Hotel in Karachi

Hotel Metropole
- Interactive map of the Hotel Metropole area

General information
- Location: Karachi-75520, Sindh, Abdullah Haroon Road, Karachi
- Coordinates: 24°51′01″N 67°01′51″E
- Opening: 1954
- Owner: Habibullah Khan (Mega & Forbes Group)

Design and construction
- Developer: Cyrus Minwalla

Hotel Metropole (Urdu: ہوٹل میٹروپول) is a defunct hotel on Abdullah Haroon Road (formerly Victoria Road) in Karachi, Pakistan.

== History ==
Hotel Metropole was founded by Cyrus Minwalla. Construction began in 1949 on land provided by the Dinshaw family. The hotel was inaugurated in 1951 by Shah Mohammad Reza Pahlavi of Iran, in the presence of Prime Minister Liaquat Ali Khan and Fatima Jinnah, and opened to the public in 1954.

The ground floor once housed the offices of Pan American and KLM. The hotel was among the first establishments in Karachi to introduce a music and dance floor, and operated the nightclub "Summer".

Following the Indo-Pakistani War of 1971 and the economic difficulties it brought, half of the hotel was converted into office space. A dedicated floor was reserved for Lufthansa crew until 1998. After the September 11 attacks, both Lufthansa and Swissair ceased operations in Pakistan, further reducing the hotel's occupancy.

The hotel closed and partial demolition began in 2004. By 2006–07, reconstruction plans had been abandoned and half the building remained dismantled.

In 2018, businessman Habibullah Khan acquired the building and its land. In September 2019, the Government of Sindh moved to acquire the site to prevent high-rise development, proposing instead the creation of a public park. In February 2020, the Sindh High Court suspended the demolition order.

As of March 2025, construction of a commercial showroom by Mega Conglomerate was under way at the site.
