= Moinabad, Karachi =

Residential neighbourhood locality in Karachi, Pakistan

Moinabad (Urdu: معین آباد) is one of the residential neighbourhoods of Karachi, Sindh, Pakistan. It is part of Landhi Town in Karachi city.

Moinabad often face problems regarding gas supply and poor road conditions.
