= Punjab Town, Karachi =

Residential neighbourhood in Karachi, Pakistan

Punjab Town (Urdu: پنجاب ٹاؤن) is one of the neighbourhoods of Shah Faisal Town in Karachi, Sindh, Pakistan.

There are several ethnic groups in Punjab Town including Muhajirs, Sindhis, Kashmiris, Seraikis, Pakhtuns, Balochis, Memons, Bohras, Ismailis, etc. Over 99% of the population is Muslim. The population of Shah Faisal Town is 641,894 as per 2023 Pakistani Census.

There is a small bazaar from where the daily need things are available. There is one Jamia Masjid named Tayiba Masjid in the center of Punjab Town.
