= Burmee Colony =

Burmee Colony برمی کالونی
- Neighbourhood
- Country: Pakistan
- Province: Sindh
- City: Karachi
- Town: Landhi Town

Demographics
  - Ethnicities: Bengalis, Rohingya, Sindhis

The Burmee Colony (often referred to as Burmi Colony or Burma Colony) (Urdu: برمی کالونی) is one of the neighbourhoods of Landhi Subdivisions in Karachi, Sindh, Pakistan.

Burmee Colony is a Rohingya-majority neighbourhood in Karachi. Burmee Colony ("Burma Colony" locality) is one of the two main Rohingya settlements in Karachi. The other one is Arkanabad in Karachi. Arkanabad is named after Rakhine State, Myanmar.

The Rohingya Muslims (Urdu: روہنگیا مسلمان) are ethnic group from Rakhine State, Myanmar (also known as Arakan, Burma), who have fled their homeland because of the persecution of Muslims by the Burmese government and Buddhist majority.

== Population ==
According to community leaders and social scientists, there are over 1.6 million Bengalis and up to 400,000 Rohingyas living in Karachi.

== Demography ==
There are several ethnic groups residing in this colony including Urdu-speaking people, Sindhis, Kashmiris, Seraikis, Pakhtuns, Balochs, Memons, Bohras, Ismailis and Christians.

== Rohingya/Burmese Muslims ==
Hundreds of thousands over the past several years Rohingya Muslims (often referred to as Burmese) have made Karachi their home.

This neighborhood is named after the Muslim Rohingyas refugees who hail from Myanmar (formerly Burma).

Large scale Rohingya migration to Karachi made Karachi one of the largest population centres of Rohingyas in the world after Myanmar.

According to community leaders and social scientists, there are over 1.6 million Bengalis and up to 400,000 Rohingyas living in Karachi, which is the highest number after Myanmar and now Bangladesh.

== See also ==
- Rohingya people in Pakistan
