= Shah Faisal Colony =

Shah Faisal Colony شاہ فیصل کالونی Drigh Colony
- Municipality
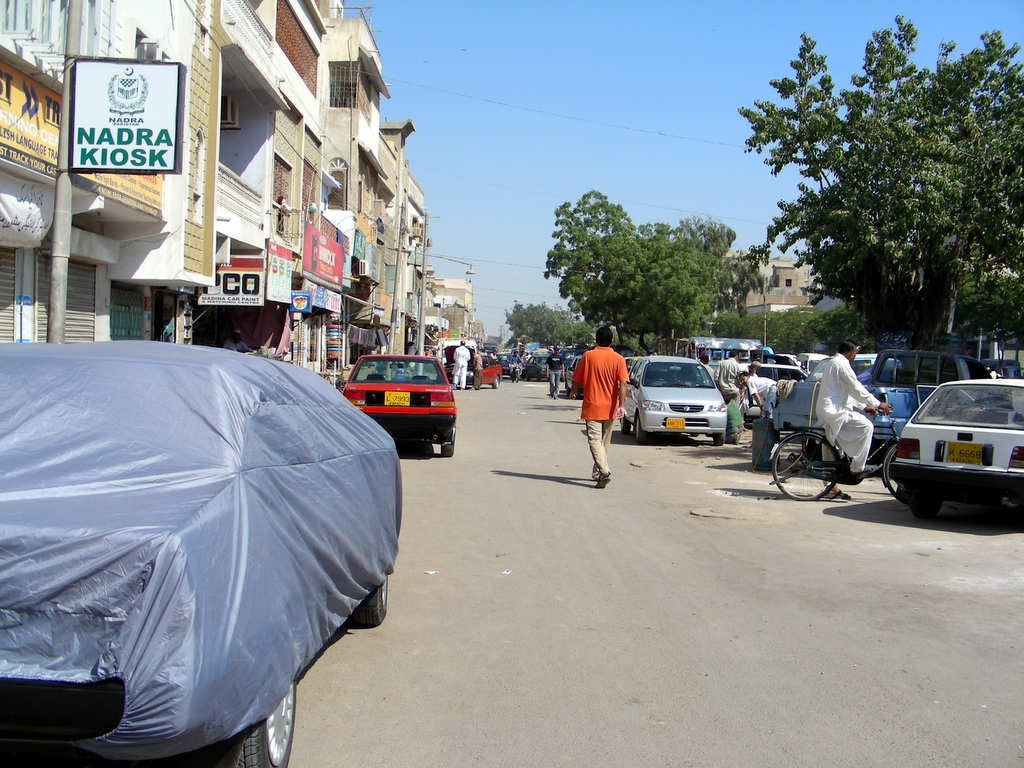
- Alfalah Society, Shah Faisal Subdivision

- Location within Sindh
- Coordinates: 24°53′N 67°09′E
- Country: Pakistan
- Province: Sindh
- City: Karachi
- District: Korangi District
- Established: 1952

Government
  - Constituency: NA-239 (Korangi Karachi-I)
  - National Assembly Member: Aasia Ishaque (MQM-P)

Population (2022)
  - Total: 500,000

Shah Faisal Colony (Urdu: شاہ فیصل کالونی), founded as Drigh Colony due to the Shah-re-Faisal Road being Drigh Road (Drigh Village Refugee Colony) is a residential and commercial area in Karachi, Sindh province of Pakistan. It has a population of just over 600,000. It is split into 3 sectors, Shah Faisal 1, 2 and 3. There are restaurants, shops and the Fauji Foundation Hospital located near a "Eidgah" where the bi-annual Eid Prayers are held. It is also used as a Cricket and Sports ground.

== History ==
Shah Faisal Colony was founded in 1952 and is located in Shah Faisal town of Korangi district. The area is named after the late King Faisal of Saudi Arabia. Drigh Colony was the previous name of this area. It is the house of Drigh Colony railway station.
