= Shahrah-e-Faisal =

Major street in Karachi, Pakistan

Shahrah-e-Faisal شاہراۂ فیصل
- Drigh Road
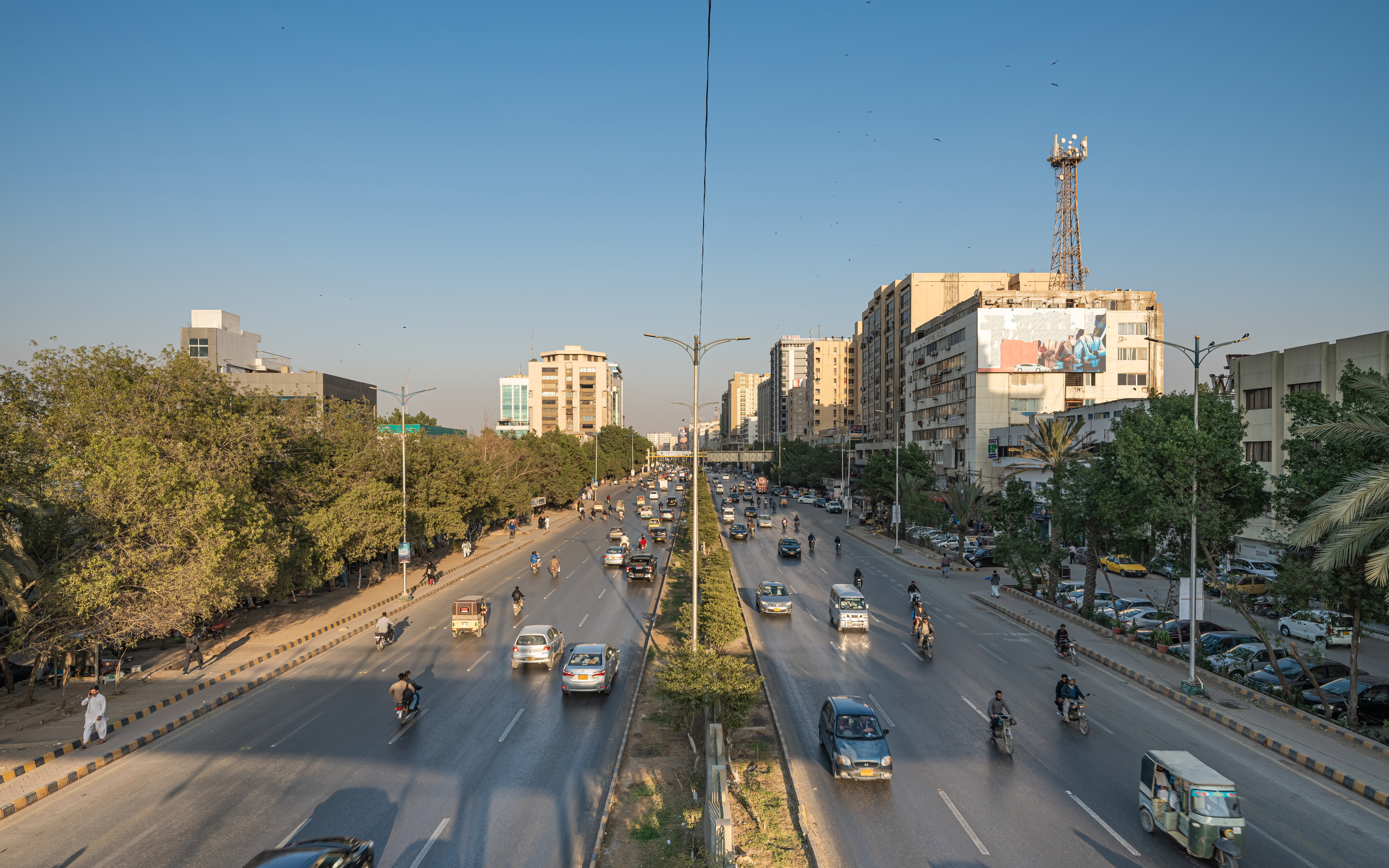
- Shahrah-e-Faisal
- Interactive map of Shahrah-e-Faisal شاہراۂ فیصل
- Former name: Drigh Road (ڈرگ روڈ)
- Length: 18 km (11 mi)
- Location: Karachi, Pakistan
- East end: Hotel Metropole
- West end: Stargate

Construction
- Inauguration: between 1922 and 1932

Shahrah-e-Faisal, founded as Drigh Road, is a boulevard in Karachi, Pakistan that runs 18 km (11 mi), from the Bhutto Underpass near Hotel Metropole in central Karachi, to Star Gate near Jinnah International Airport, where it becomes N-5 National Highway.

This road is one of Karachi's busiest, and is used by approximately 250,000 cars and vehicles daily.

== History ==
Jam-packed Shahrah-e-Faisal

It is not clear when the road was built, however the first Tata Airlines flight took off on 15 October 1932, from Karachi's Drigh Road Aerodrome, and the record mentions the road. RAF Drigh Road was a Royal Air Force base, where T. E. Lawrence, famously known as "Lawrence of Arabia," was stationed between 1927 and 1928. The airbase was established in 1918 and is now PAF Base Faisal.

A map of Karachi from 1922 doesn’t mention the road, though a map from 1944 does. Because of this, it is likely it was made in the mid to late 1920s or the very early 1930s.

In the 1970s, Shahrah-e-Faisal was part of the National Highway and thus belonged to the Government of Sindh. In 1977 under the dictatorship of General Zia-ul-Haq, Drigh Road was officially renamed Shahrah-e-Faisal after King Faisal of Saudi Arabia. The city of Lyallpur was also renamed Faisalabad in his honour that year. Only the road itself was renamed, and the Drigh Road name continues to be used in other contexts, such as Drigh Road Railway Station, Drigh Road Flyover, and Drigh Colony. The old name continues to be used informally.

In the 1980s, the Government of Sindh transferred the road to the Karachi Metropolitan Corporation. An estimated 250,000 or more above vehicles now use the road daily.

In 1982, the first duty free shop in Pakistan was built near the Star Gate of Karachi Airport. It was made and run by a subsidiary of Pakistan International Airlines (PIA).

In 1987, Shahrah-e-Faisal had around 30 hoardings (billboards). By 2014, their number had grown to 140, from Hotel Metropole to Gora Qabristan, earning the Karachi Metropolitan Corporation Rs. 250 million per year. In 2018, the Supreme Court of Pakistan ordered these billboards removed because, over time, several had collapsed in strong winds, killing and injuring a number of people. In 2016, the Karachi Metropolitan Corporation decided to demolish the Drigh Road Flyover, which needed multiple repairs since it was built in 1996. This flyover on Shahrah-e-Faisal takes traffic from the airport towards Gulshan-e-Iqbal.

== Upgrades ==
- 2003 – The majority of traffic signals have been removed – only two remain. The conversion into a signal-free road began in 2003 to 2007.
- 2012 – Solar-powered streetlights installed by Karachi Metropolitan Corporation.
- 2016 – A new traffic management plan was made.
- 2016 – Rickshaws were banned for causing accidents and traffic problems.
- 2016 – As part of the Karachi Mega Infrastructure Development Projects, greenery was added on each side, as well as the green patches, and footpaths were built.
- 2016 – Karachi Metropolitan Corporation spent Rs 70 million on the replacement of old bulbs with energy-saving mercury bulbs on roads in Karachi, starting with Shahrah-e-Faisal.
- 2017 – Thousands of trees and hundreds of electric poles were uprooted by the Local Government Development Project Directorate in order for the road to be widened by 12–15 m (40–50 ft) on both sides. The area from Star Gate to the Finance and Trade Centre was re-paved by the government of Sindh in Phase I of the Karachi Development Project. A complete overhaul of the Drigh Road Flyover was started after the completion of the Aan underpass.
- 2018 – The area from the Finance and Trade Centre to Metropole was re-paved.
- 2019 - Separate lane for motorbikes was made on Sharah-e-Faisal.

== Traffic ==
Shahrah-e-Faisal is one of Karachi's busiest roads, and is the site of frequent traffic jams. The Road Traffic Injury and Prevention Centre of Jinnah Postgraduate Medical Centre showed that at least one person dies, and an average of 83 people are wounded, every day on Karachi roads. Shahrah-e-Faisal is considered to be the deadliest road.
