= Shah Faisal Town =

Administrative subdivision or town within Karachi, Pakistan

Shah Faisal Town شاہ فیصل ٹاؤن شاھ فيصل ٽائون
- Constituent Town of Karachi
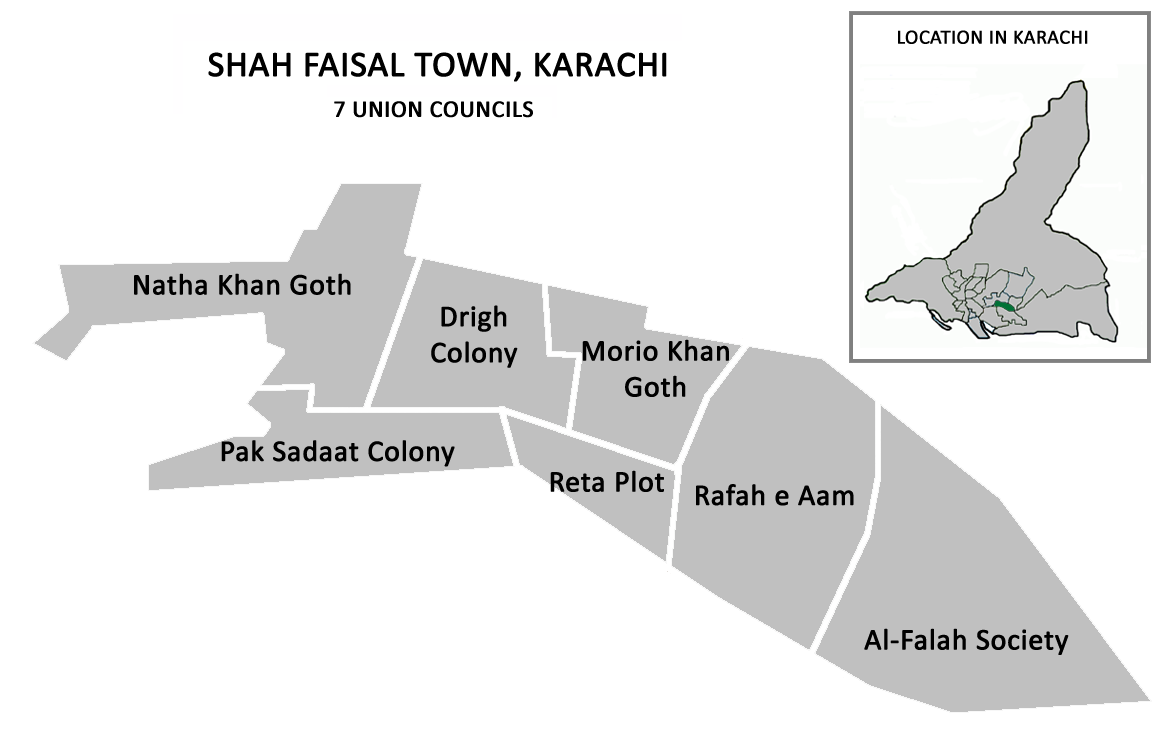
- Shah Faisal Subdivision was divided into 7 Union Councils
- Coordinates: 24.8806°N 67.1625°E
- Country: Pakistan
- Province: Sindh
- City District: Karachi
- Established: 2001
- Union Councils: 8: Al-Falah Society; Drigh Colony; Moria Khan Goth; Natha Khan Goth; Pak Sadat Colony; Rafa-e-Aam Society; Reta Plot; Shah Faisal Colony

Government
  - Type: Town Council
  - Town Nazim (Mayor): Goher Khattak
  - Municipal Officer: Syed Fuzail Ahmed Bukhari

Population (2023 Census of Pakistan)
  - Total: 641,894
- Office location: Town Municipal Administration, Shah Faisal Town, Extension elementary College Block-2, Shah Faisal Colony, near Superior Science College Karachi

Shah Faisal Town (Sindhi: شاہ فیصل ٽائون, Urdu: شاہ فیصل ٹاؤن) lies in the eastern part of the city that took its name from Shah Faisal Colony.

== Town Municipal Committee ==
As per the Sindh Local Government Act, 2021, Sindh government replaced the previous seven District Municipal Corporations (DMCs) with 26 towns, each with its own municipal committee. Korangi District has four towns.

- Shah Faisal Town
- Landhi Town
- Korangi Town
- Model Colony Town, Karachi

== History ==
Shah Faisal Town was formed in 2001 as part of The Local Government Ordinance 2001. In 2021, it was reorganized as the Town Municipal Corporation Shah Faisal under the Korangi District.

== Neighbourhoods ==
Shah Faisal Town has twenty-two densely populated neighbourhoods:

- Al-Falah Society
- Al-Haider Housing Society
- Azeem Pura
- Hasan Mujtaba Town
- Drigh Colony
- Drigh Road Cantt Bazar
- Golden Town
- Green Town
- Gulshan-e-Muneer
- Iqbalabad
- Kehkashan Society
- Khoso Goth
- Moria Khan Goth
- Natha Khan Goth
- Pak Sadat Colony
- Punjab Town
- Rafah-e-Aam Society
- Reta Plot
- Sachal Goth
- Salman Farsi
- Shah Faisal Colony
- Shamsi Society

== See also ==
- Government of Karachi
- Korangi District
