= Khai =

- Village
- Location within Pakistan
- Coordinates: 32.50°N 72.46°E
- Country: Pakistan
- Province: Punjab
- Elevation: 576 m (1,890 ft)

Population
  - Total: ~1,000
- Time zone: UTC+5 (PST)

Khai is a village in the Punjab province of Pakistan.

== History ==
According to legend, the settlement was given the name "Khai" due to a British man accidentally falling into a ditch (Khai in Urdu) and shouting "I have fallen into a Khai!". Thus the village name was later changed from "Noorpur Thallianwala" to "Khai".
