= Phitti =

Wheat flour bread from Hunza & Nagar

- Place of origin: Pakistan
- Region or state: Gilgit-Baltistan
- Main ingredients: Flour, water, butter, yeast

Phitti is a type of leavened bread baked by Hunzakut and Nagarkutz People of Hunza and Nagar, Gilgit-Baltistan, Pakistan.

Preparation involves mixing flour, water, salt, butter and yeast, with other ingredients such as milk being added depending on personal taste. The dough thus prepared is placed in a metallic vessel called a Khimishdon in Burushaski and placed in a hearth which is preheated with a wooden fire. Alternatively, phitti can also be baked in an oven.

Phitti is eaten with butter during breakfast, as a snack or light lunch along with a salted cup of tea.
