= Muhammad Javed Hanif Khan =

Pakistani politician

- محمد جاوید حنیف خان

Member of the Provincial Assembly of Sindh
- In office 13 August 2018 – 11 August 2023
- Constituency: PS-95 Korangi Karachi-IV

Personal details
- Born: Karachi, Sindh, Pakistan
- Party: MQM-P (2017-present)

Muhammad Javed Hanif Khan (born 23 April 1955) is a retired Grade 20 officer of the Pakistan Administrative Service, who later joined politics and served as a member of the Provincial Assembly of Sindh from August 2018 to August 2023.

== Early life and education ==
He was born on 23 April 1955 in Karachi, Pakistan.

He received a degree of Bachelor of Engineering in civil from the NED University of Engineering and Technology. He also holds a degree of Master of Arts in economics and Bachelor of Laws from the University of Karachi.

== Professional career ==
He joined the Pakistan Administrative Service and began his career in 1986. As a bureaucrat, he served in multiple positions in the Karachi City Government such as the Executive District Officer (Revenue) in 2003 and District Coordination Officer (DCO) of Karachi in 2007. He also served as deputy commissioner of Karachi (central), deputy commissioner of Sukkur, and Badin.

He served as director general of planning and development at the Port Qasim Authority before becoming chairman of the Karachi Port Trust (KPT) in July 2012. He was removed as Chairman of the KPT in August 2013. He retired as Grade 20 officer of the Pakistan Administrative Service.

== Political career ==
He joined Muttahida Qaumi Movement – Pakistan (MQM-P) in October 2017.

He was elected to the Provincial Assembly of Sindh as a candidate of MQM from PS-95 Korangi Karachi-IV in the 2018 Sindh provincial election. Following his successful election, MQM nominated him for the office of Speaker of the Provincial Assembly of Sindh. On 15 August 2018, he received 59 votes and was defeated by Agha Siraj Durrani.
