= Model Colony Town, Karachi =

Neighbourhood in Karachi, Pakistan

Coordinates: 24°54′10″N 67°11′27″E

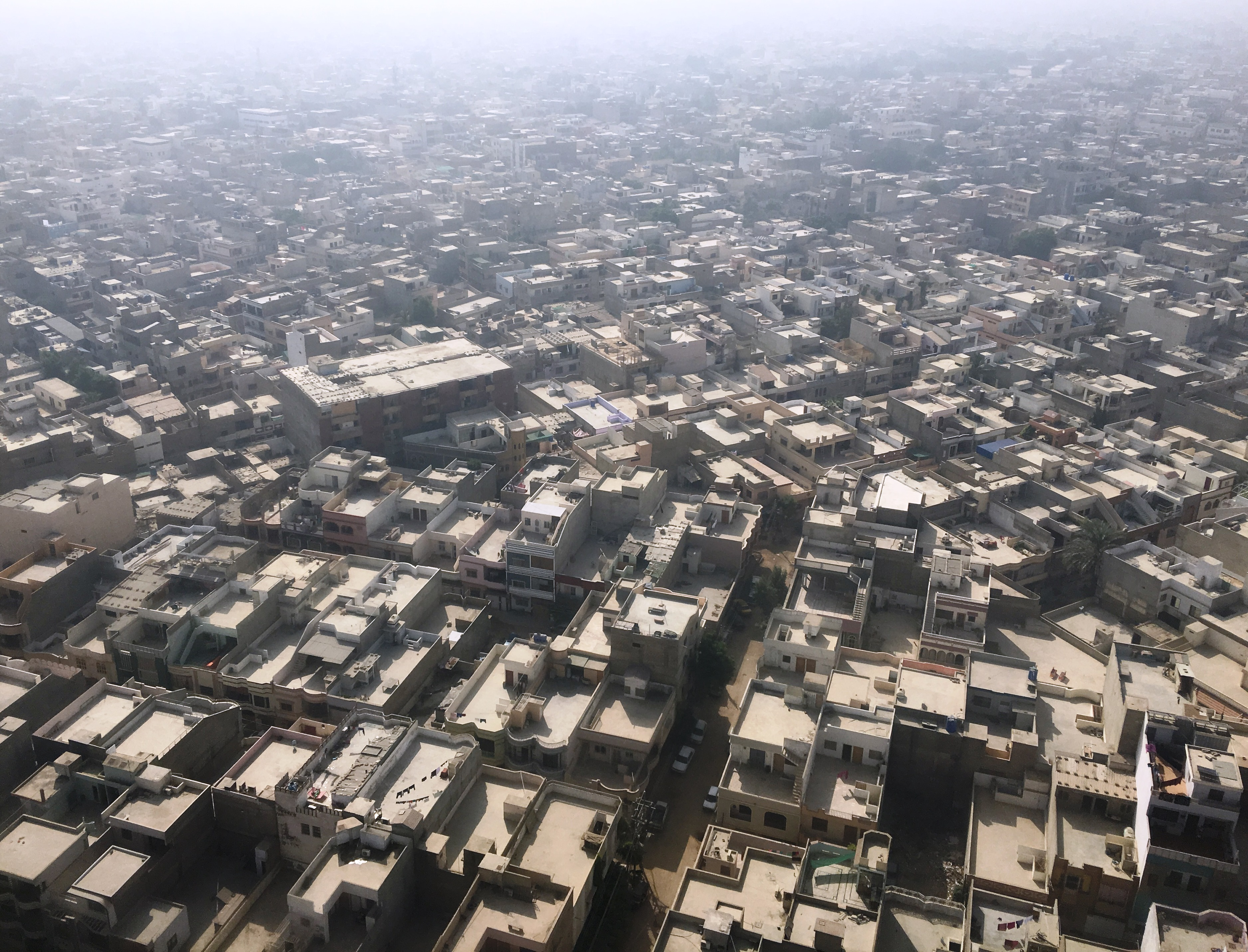
Karachi – Malir Town – Gulshan Model Colony

Model Colony Karachi is a neighborhood in Karachi, Pakistan, that is within Korangi District. It is situated on the outskirts of the city about two miles northeast of Jinnah International Airport, Karachi's international airport.

== Plane crash ==
On May 22, 2020, a Pakistan International Airlines Airbus A320 doing as Flight 8303 crashed in the neighborhood. All but two of the 99 people on board died, including a person on the ground, having 98 fatalities. The engine scraped the runway first, followed by the right engine.

== Notable residents ==
- Saeed Azad (national cricketer)
- Rashid Latif (national cricketer)
- Saeed Anwar (national cricketer)
- Basit Ali (national cricketer)
- Asim Kamal (national cricketer)
- Mirza Iqbal Baig (Sports journalist / TV anchor)
- Rizwan Malik (cricketer)
- Maham Tariq (national women's cricketer)
- Aasia Ishaque (Secretary Information of APML)
