= Aasia Ishaque =

Pakistani politician

- آسيه اسحاق

Founder Member of PSP
- In office May 2016 – January 2023
- Leader: Syed Mustafa Kamal; PSP

Spokesperson to Gen(R) Pervez Musharraf and Member of AML
- In office 2012–2015
- Leader: Pervez Musharraf; AML

Central Secretary of Information
- In office 2012–2014
- Leader: Pervez Musharraf; AML

PML(Q) of General Secretary
- In office 2007–2012
- Leader: Shujaat Hussain; PML(Q)

Member of PTI and Core Committee
- In office 2002–2006
- Leader: Imran Khan; PTI

Personal details
- Born: 20 August 1970 (age 56) Karachi, Sindh, Pakistan
- Party: MQM-P (2023-present)
- Other political affiliations: PSP (2016-2023); AML (2012-2014); PML(Q) (2007-2012); PTI (2002-2006)
- Relations: Mohammad Ishaque Siddiqui (Father)
- Education: University of Karachi

Aasia Ishaque (آسيه اسحاق) is a hardcore Muhajir politician and businesswoman, who is currently serving as a member of the National Assembly of Pakistan since February 2024. She was a senior, active and a vocal leader of Pak Sarzameen Party (PSP). Previously, she served as Secretary Information in All Pakistan Muslim League presided by Pervez Musharraf till 2014 and held the position of Central Secretary of Information in (APML).

== Family and background ==
Aasia was born on 20 August 1970 in metropolitan city of Karachi, Sindh, Pakistan. She is daughter of Mohammad Ishaque Siddiqui and belongs to an educated Muhajir Muslim family, which migrated from Uttar Pradesh, India at the time of Indo-Pak partition.

== Education ==
After secondary and higher secondary schooling in Karachi through Kulsoom Bai Valika Airport Model School and Government Degree Science College Malir Cantt, she pursued Bachelor of Pharmacy from University of Karachi.

== Political career ==
Pakistan Tehreek-e-Insaf

Aasia initiated her political career in 2002 by joining Pakistan Tehreek-e-Insaf (PTI), contested National Assembly Elections in 2002 through General Seat and hold the Membership of CEC and Core Committee of PTI till 2006.

Pakistan League – Q

Joined Pakistan League – Q (PML-Q) in 2007, as General Secretary for Women Wing of Pakistan, CEC and CWC under the leadership of Chaudhry Shujaat Hussain and left in 2012.

All Pakistan Muslim League

Designated as Information Secretary of APML in 2012 and sustain the position till 2014, Furthermore, she is still Member of the Central Executive Committee (CEC) of APML.

Pak Sar Zameen Party

Joined Pak Sarzameen Party (PSP) as a founder member on 25 May 2016 and contributing her efforts to recognize the party at national level under the leadership of Syed Mustafa Kamal.

MQM Pakistan

She joined MQM Pakistan with Mustafa Kamal when PSP merged with MQM Pakistan. She Contest the 2024 Election on National Assembly Seat NA-232 and won it convincingly.

Ishaque spoke at the first all woman gathering for the local government elections in Karachi in 2020 organised by PSP.
