= List of cultural heritage sites in Karachi =

Following is the list of cultural heritage sites in Karachi, Sindh, Pakistan.

== Protected sites ==
Following is the list of sites formerly protected by the Government of Pakistan.

National Monuments, UNESCO inscribed and tentative sites

ID	Name	Type	Location	District	Coordinates	Image
SD-31	Wazir Mansion		New Newham Road, Bundar Quarter, Kharadar	Karachi		Wazir Mansion More images Upload Photo
SD-32	Chaukhandi Tombs		Near Landhi on National Highway	Karachi		Chaukhandi Tombs More images Upload Photo
SD-33	Khaliq Deena Hall		Muhammad Ali Jinnah Road	Karachi		Khaliq Deena Hall More images Upload Photo
SD-34	Frere Hall		Abdullah Haroon Road	Karachi		Frere Hall More images Upload Photo
SD-35	Quaid-e-Azam House		Fatima Jinnah Road	Karachi		Quaid-e-Azam House More images Upload Photo
SD-36	Mazar-e-Quaid		Muhammad Ali Jinnah Road	Karachi		Mazar-e-Quaid More images Upload Photo

== Protected Heritage ==
The sites below are declared Protected Heritage by the Government of Sindh.

Karachi has over 350 sites which are protected under the Provincial Act. Sites are listed under broad areas or quarters under which they are located. Some streets/roads are found in two areas. Sites located on them are found under their respective area.

=== Bunder Quarter ===
This includes Muhammad Ali Jinnah Road (formerly Bunder Road) which is one of the city’s main arteries. It also includes some places near the main road.

ID	Name	Type	Location	District	Coordinates	Image
SD-P-9	Asia Building		Muhammad Ali Jinnah Road (Bunder Road)	Karachi		Asia Building More images Upload Photo
SD-P-10	City Courts		Muhammad Ali Jinnah Road	Karachi		City Courts More images Upload Photo
SD-P-11	Dadabhoy Centre		Muhammad Ali Jinnah Road	Karachi		Upload Photo Upload Photo
SD-P-12	Essai Ibrahim Building		Muhammad Ali Jinnah Road	Karachi		Upload Photo Upload Photo
SD-P-13	Feroze House		Muhammad Ali Jinnah Road/Serai Road	Karachi		Upload Photo Upload Photo
SD-P-14	Ferozpurwala Chamber		Muhammad Ali Jinnah Road	Karachi		Upload Photo Upload Photo
SD-P-15	Hafiz Chamber		Muhammad Ali Jinnah Road	Karachi		Upload Photo Upload Photo
SD-P-16	Karachi Metropolitan Corporation Building		Muhammad Ali Jinnah Road	Karachi		Karachi Metropolitan Corporation Building More images Upload Photo
SD-P-17	Mandiwala Building		Muhammad Ali Jinnah Road	Karachi		Mandiwala Building More images Upload Photo
SD-P-18	Denso Hall		Muhammad Ali Jinnah Road	Karachi		Denso Hall More images Upload Photo
SD-P-19	Mercantile Bank Building		Muhammad Ali Jinnah Road	Karachi		Upload Photo Upload Photo
SD-P-20	Merewether Clock Tower		I.I. Chundrigar Road (McLeod Road) /Muhammad Ali Jinnah Road	Karachi		Merewether Clock Tower More images Upload Photo
SD-P-21	Moriswala Building		Muhammad Ali Jinnah Road	Karachi		Moriswala Building More images Upload Photo
SD-P-22	New Cloth Market		Muhammad Ali Jinnah Road/Saleh Mohammad Road (Dunnolly Road)	Karachi		New Cloth Market More images Upload Photo
SD-P-23	Old Sindh Assembly Building (NJV High School)		Muhammad Ali Jinnah Road	Karachi		Old Sindh Assembly Building (NJV High School) More images Upload Photo
SD-P-24	Rustomji Building		I.I. Chundrigar Road/Muhammad Ali Jinnah Road	Karachi		Upload Photo Upload Photo
SD-P-25	Salim Centre		Muhammad Ali Jinnah Road	Karachi		Upload Photo Upload Photo
SD-P-26	Sheikh Electric Market		Muhammad Ali Jinnah Road	Karachi		Upload Photo Upload Photo
SD-P-27	Shikarpuri Cloth Market		Muhammad Ali Jinnah Road	Karachi		Upload Photo Upload Photo
SD-P-28	Shri Laxmi Narayan Mandir		Muhammad Ali Jinnah Road	Karachi		Shri Laxmi Narayan Mandir More images Upload Photo
SD-P-29	Karachi Port Trust Building		Eduljee Dinshaw Road	Karachi		Karachi Port Trust Building More images Upload Photo

=== Cantonment ===
ID	Name	Type	Location	District	Coordinates	Image
SD-P-30	Cantonment Board Building (old)			Karachi		Upload Photo Upload Photo
SD-P- 31	Barach		near old Cantonment Board Building	Karachi		Upload Photo Upload Photo
SD-P-32	Karachi Cantonment railway station		Dr. Daudpota Road	Karachi		Karachi Cantonment railway station More images Upload Photo
SD-P-33	Information and Selection Centre		231 A, Raja Ghazanfar Ali Road (Somerset Street)	Karachi		Upload Photo Upload Photo
SD-P-34	Jennings Private School		Fatima Jinnah Road	Karachi		Upload Photo Upload Photo
SD-P-35	Julian Dinshaw House		Fatima Jinnah Road	Karachi		Upload Photo Upload Photo
SD-P-36	Karachi Press Club		267, Sarwar Shaheed Road (Ingle Road), R. A. Lines	Karachi		Karachi Press Club More images Upload Photo
SD-P-37	Kirmani House		271 Strachen Road, R. A. Lines	Karachi		Upload Photo Upload Photo
SD-P-38	Offices		223, Dr. Daudpota Road, E.I. Lines	Karachi		Upload Photo Upload Photo
SD-P-39	Officers’ Suits		221, Raja Ghazanfar Ali Road, E. I. Lines	Karachi		Upload Photo Upload Photo
SD-P-40	Pakistan American Cultural Centre (PACC)		Fatima Jinnah Road	Karachi		Pakistan American Cultural Centre (PACC) More images Upload Photo
SD-P-41	Residence (private)		202-A/B, Dr. Daudpota Road (Frere Street)	Karachi		Upload Photo Upload Photo
SD-P-42	Residence (private)		Dr. Daudpota Road, E.I. Lines	Karachi		Upload Photo Upload Photo
SD-P-43	Residence, Talati		Sarwar Shaheed Road, R.A. Lines	Karachi		Upload Photo Upload Photo
SD-P-44	Residence of the Consul General of the USA		Fatima Jinnah Road	Karachi		Upload Photo Upload Photo

=== Civil Lines ===
ID	Name	Type	Location	District	Coordinates	Image
SD-P-45	American Consulate (old)		Abdullah Haroon Road Civil Lines	Karachi		American Consulate (old) More images Upload Photo
SD-P-46	Bristol Hotel		Sunnyside Road	Karachi		Bristol Hotel More images Upload Photo
SD-P-47	Chief Minister’s House (Sindh)		Dr. Ziauddin Road	Karachi		Upload Photo Upload Photo
SD-P-48	Chief Secretary’s House (Sindh)		Club Road	Karachi		Upload Photo Upload Photo
SD-P-48	Commissioner’s House (Sindh)		Club Road	Karachi		Upload Photo Upload Photo
SD-P-49	Commissioner’s Office (Kutchery)		Club Road	Karachi		Upload Photo Upload Photo
SD-P-50	Collector’s Kutchery		Club Road (Scandal Point Road)	Karachi		Upload Photo Upload Photo
SD-P-51	Edward House		Abdullah Haroon Road	Karachi		Edward House More images Upload Photo
SD-P-52	Katrak Mansion		Abdullah Haroon Road	Karachi		Upload Photo Upload Photo
SD-P-53	Holy Trinity Cathedral and Chaplain House		Fatima Jinnah Road	Karachi		Holy Trinity Cathedral and Chaplain House More images Upload Photo
SD-P-55	Jhumra Autos Building		Dr. Ziauddin Ahmed Road	Karachi		Upload Photo Upload Photo
SD-P-56	Jinnah Courts		Dr. Ziauddin Road	Karachi		Jinnah Courts More images Upload Photo
SD-P-57	Judge’s House		near Chief Minister’s (Sindh) House off. Dr. Ziauddin Road	Karachi		Upload Photo Upload Photo
SD-P-58	Lotia Building no 2		Abdullah Haroon Road/Club Road	Karachi		Lotia Building no 2 More images Upload Photo
SD-P-59	Noor Manzil		Dr. Ziauddin Ahmed Road	Karachi		Upload Photo Upload Photo
SD-P-60	Services Club (Union Jack Club)		Fatima Jinnah Road	Karachi		Upload Photo Upload Photo
SD-P-61	Sind Club (main building) (both wings) and Millionaire Row		Abdullah Haroon Road	Karachi		Upload Photo Upload Photo
SD-P-63	Sindh Governor House		Aiwan-e-Sadr Road	Karachi		Sindh Governor House More images Upload Photo
SD-P-64	State Guest House, Karachi		Abdullah Haroon Road	Karachi		Upload Photo Upload Photo
SD-P-65	Survey of Pakistan Building		Governor House Compound, Abdullah Haroon Road	Karachi		Survey of Pakistan Building Upload Photo
SD-P-66	Victoria Mansion		Abdullah Haroon Road (Victoria Road)	Karachi		Victoria Mansion Upload Photo
SD-P-67	Victoria Museum, Karachi		M.R. Kiyani Road	Karachi		Victoria Museum, Karachi More images Upload Photo

=== Clifton ===
ID	Name	Type	Location	District	Coordinates	Image
SD-P-68	Abdullah Shah Ghazi Mausoleum		Clifton	Karachi		Abdullah Shah Ghazi Mausoleum More images Upload Photo
SD-P-69	Bhopal House		Hatim Alvi Road/Motilal Goverhandas Road, Clifton (near Mohatta Palace)	Karachi		Bhopal House More images Upload Photo
SD-P-70	Jehangir Kothari Parade		Shahrah-e-Firdousi, Clifton	Karachi		Jehangir Kothari Parade More images Upload Photo
SD-P-71	Katrak Bandstand		Jehangir Kothari Parade and Pavilion	Karachi		Katrak Bandstand More images Upload Photo
SD-P-72	Lady Lloyd Pier		Shahrah-e-Firdousi, Clifton (Jehangir Kothari Parade)	Karachi		Lady Lloyd Pier More images Upload Photo
SD-P-73	Kazi House		9 Old Clifton (Adjacent to Mohatta Palace)	Karachi		Upload Photo Upload Photo
SD-P-74	Mohatta Palace		Motilal Goverhandas Road, Clifton	Karachi		Mohatta Palace More images Upload Photo
SD-P-75	Motumal Shivaram Petpal Fountain		Bagh-e-ibn-Qasim, off Shahrah-e-Firdousi, Clifton	Karachi		Upload Photo Upload Photo
SD-P-76	Water Trough		Shahrah-e-Iran	Karachi		Water Trough More images Upload Photo

=== Dr. Ziauddin Ahmed Road ===
ID	Name	Type	Location	District	Coordinates	Image
SD-P-77	Adamjee Building		Dr. Ziauddin Ahmed Road (Kutchery Road)	Karachi		Adamjee Building More images Upload Photo
SD-P-78	Aziz Manzil	Building	Dr. Ziauddin Ahmed Road	Karachi		Upload Photo Upload Photo
SD-P-79	D. J. Sindh Government Science College		Plot no. 3 & 4, RB/4, Dr. Ziauddin Ahmed Road	Karachi		D. J. Sindh Government Science College More images Upload Photo
SD-P-80	Mitharam Hostel Building		Dr. Ziauddin Ahmed Road	Karachi		Upload Photo Upload Photo
SD-P-81	Fine Publishers Building		Dr. Ziauddin Ahmed Road	Karachi		Upload Photo Upload Photo
SD-P-82	Faiz-e-Hussaini Building		Dr. Ziauddin Ahmed Road	Karachi		Faiz-e-Hussaini Building More images Upload Photo

=== Frere Town Quarter ===
ID	Name	Type	Location	District	Coordinates	Image
SD-P-83	Bankwalla House	Building	Mary Road	Karachi		Upload Photo Upload Photo
SD-P-84	Chartered Bank House	Building: company owned	Framroze Road, Karachi	Karachi		Upload Photo Upload Photo
SD-P-85	Clifton Bridge	Bridge	Clifton Road	Karachi		Clifton Bridge More images Upload Photo
SD-P-86	DN House	Building	Adams Road	Karachi		Upload Photo Upload Photo
SD-P-87	Homi B. Javat Building	Building	off McNeil Road	Karachi		Upload Photo Upload Photo
SD-P-88	Kharas House	Building	Bath Island Road	Karachi		Upload Photo Upload Photo
SD-P-89	Mennen Soars Building	Building	Adams Road	Karachi		Upload Photo Upload Photo
SD-P-90	Minoo Marker House	Building	Feroze Nana Road, Bath Island	Karachi		Upload Photo Upload Photo
SD-P-91	Railway Building	Building	13 McNeil Road	Karachi		Upload Photo Upload Photo
SD-P-92	Railway Building	Building	Ulley Road	Karachi		Upload Photo Upload Photo
SD-P-93	Railway Offices	Building: offices	Adams Road	Karachi		Upload Photo Upload Photo
SD-P-94	Water Trough	Water trough	Adams Road	Karachi		Water Trough More images Upload Photo

=== Keamari ===
ID	Name	Type	Location	District	Coordinates	Image
SD-P-95	Christ Church		near Jackson Police Station, Keamari	Karachi		Upload Photo Upload Photo
SD-P-96	Hindu Ghat		Native Jetty Bridge	Karachi		Hindu Ghat Upload Photo
SD-P-97	Mules Mansion		Keamari	Karachi		Mules Mansion More images Upload Photo
SD-P-98	Water trough		near Harding Bridge	Karachi		Water trough More images Upload Photo

=== Manora ===
ID	Name	Type	Location	District	Coordinates	Image
SD-P-99	Deputy Conservator's House		Manora	Karachi		Upload Photo Upload Photo
SD-P-100	Flag Mast		Manora	Karachi		Upload Photo Upload Photo
SD-P-101	Harbour Master’s House		Manora	Karachi		Upload Photo Upload Photo
SD-P-102	Shri Varun Dev Mandir		Manora	Karachi		Shri Varun Dev Mandir More images Upload Photo
SD-P-103	Karachi Port Trust Officers Club		Manora	Karachi		Karachi Port Trust Officers Club More images Upload Photo
SD-P-104	Manora Point Lighthouse		Manora	Karachi		Manora Point Lighthouse More images Upload Photo
SD-P-105	Observatory		Manora	Karachi		Observatory More images Upload Photo
SD-P-106	St. Anthony's Chapel		Manora	Karachi		Upload Photo Upload Photo
SD-P-107	St. Paul's Church		Manora	Karachi		St. Paul's Church More images Upload Photo
SD-P-108	Watch Tower		Manora	Karachi		Upload Photo Upload Photo

=== Market and Jail Quarters ===
ID	Name	Type	Location	District	Coordinates	Image
SD-P-109	Church Mission Society (C.M.S.) Church		Nishtar Road	Karachi		Upload Photo Upload Photo
SD-P-110	Cotton Exchange Building		I.I. Chundrigar Road (Mcleod Road)	Karachi		Cotton Exchange Building More images Upload Photo
SD-P-111	Kamil Chambers		Shahrah-e-Altaf Hussain (Napier Road)	Karachi		Upload Photo Upload Photo
SD-P-112	Lady Dufferin Hospital		Chand Bibi Street (Princess Street)	Karachi		Lady Dufferin Hospital More images Upload Photo
SD-P-113	Virabijee Katrak Maternity Wing, Lady Dufferin Hospital		Chand Bibi Street (Princess Street)	Karachi		Virabijee Katrak Maternity Wing, Lady Dufferin Hospital More images Upload Photo
SD-P-114	Sir Abdullah Haroon Building		Shahrah-e-Altaf Hussain	Karachi		Upload Photo Upload Photo
SD-P-115	Standard Chartered Bank Building		I.I. Chundrigar Road	Karachi		Standard Chartered Bank Building More images Upload Photo
SD-P-116	Standard Insurance House		I.I. Chundrigar Road	Karachi		Standard Insurance House More images Upload Photo
SD-P-117	State Bank of Pakistan (SBP)		M.A. Jinnah Road /Talpur Road (Wood Street)	Karachi		State Bank of Pakistan (SBP) More images Upload Photo
SD-P-118	Overseas Investors Chamber of Commerce and Industry (formerly KCCI)		Talpur Road (Wood Street)	Karachi		Upload Photo Upload Photo
SD-P-119	Variawa Building		I.I. Chundrigar Road	Karachi		Upload Photo Upload Photo
SD-P-120	Dhramshalla Building		Outram Road	Karachi		Upload Photo Upload Photo
SD-P-121	Menghraj Dwarkadas Building		Outram Road/Narain Road	Karachi		Upload Photo Upload Photo
SD-P-122	Kamil Mansion		Jai Ram Road, off Outram Road	Karachi		Upload Photo Upload Photo
SD-P-123	Lakshmi Chand Building		Jai Ram Road, off Outram Road	Karachi		Upload Photo Upload Photo

=== Queen’s Road Quarter ===
ID	Name	Type	Location	District	Coordinates	Image
SD-P-124	Ahmed Hemani House		Lalazar, off M.T. Khan Road	Karachi		Upload Photo Upload Photo
SD-P-125	Eastern Express Shipping Company Building		M.T. Khan Road	Karachi		Upload Photo Upload Photo
SD-P-126	Karachi Boat Club		Lalazar, off M.T. Khan Road,	Karachi		Karachi Boat Club More images Upload Photo
SD-P-127	Water Tank		Reti Lines	Karachi		Upload Photo Upload Photo

=== Saddar ===
Buildings in this section are arranged according to the street on which they are located. This also includes smaller streets off main streets.

ID	Name	Type	Location	District	Coordinates	Image
SD-P-128	Haji Yunus Building		Lane off Bohra Street	Karachi		Upload Photo Upload Photo
SD-P-129	Kanji Kara Building		Bohra Street off Raja Ghazanfar Ali Road	Karachi		Upload Photo Upload Photo
SD-P-130	Salamwala Building		Bohra Street off Raja Ghazanfar Ali Road	Karachi		Upload Photo Upload Photo
SD-P-131	Abdullah Haroon Trust Building		Raja Ghazanfar Ali Road (Somerset Street)	Karachi		Upload Photo Upload Photo
SD-P-132	Farid Mansion		Raja Ghazanfar Ali Road	Karachi		Farid Mansion More images Upload Photo
SD-P-133	Haji Abu Trust Building		Raja Ghazanfar Ali Road	Karachi		Upload Photo Upload Photo
SD-P-134	Haji Yunus Building		Raja Ghazanfar Ali Road	Karachi		Upload Photo Upload Photo
SD-P-135	Haque Building		Raja Ghazanfar Ali Road/Sheikh Chand Street	Karachi		Upload Photo Upload Photo
SD-P-136	Katchi Memon Masjid		Raja Ghazanfar Ali Road	Karachi		Katchi Memon Masjid More images Upload Photo
SD-P-137	Khawaja Manzil		Raja Ghazanfar Ali Road	Karachi		Upload Photo Upload Photo
SD-P-138	Lali Bai Building		Raja Ghazanfar Ali Road/Blenkin Street	Karachi		Upload Photo Upload Photo
SD-P-139	Medina Building		Raja Ghazanfar Ali Road	Karachi		Upload Photo Upload Photo
SD-P-140	Olympia Building		Raja Ghazanfar Ali Road	Karachi		Upload Photo Upload Photo
SD-P-141	Palia House		Raja Ghazanfar Ali Road	Karachi		Upload Photo Upload Photo
SD-P-142	United Bank Building		Raja Ghazanfar Ali Road	Karachi		Upload Photo Upload Photo
SD-P-143	Sir Jehangir Kothari Building		Raja Ghazanfar Ali Road (Somerset Street) / Shahrah-e- Iraq	Karachi		Upload Photo Upload Photo
SD-P-144	Habib Bank Plaza		I. I. Chundrigar Road	Karachi		Habib Bank Plaza More images Upload Photo
SD-P-145	Saleh M. Sttar Manzil Building		Raja Ghazanfar Ali Road/Woodburn Street	Karachi		Upload Photo Upload Photo
SD-P-146	Shirin Karimbai Jivaji Building		Raja Ghazanfar Ali Road/Woodburn Street	Karachi		Upload Photo Upload Photo
SD-P-147	Gopaldas Building		Raja Ghazanfar Ali Road/Albert Street	Karachi		Upload Photo Upload Photo
SD-P-148	Abdul Aziz Building		Raja Ghazanfar Ali Road/Albert Street	Karachi		Upload Photo Upload Photo
SD-P-149	Abu Bakar Building		Albert Street off Zaibunnisa Street	Karachi		Upload Photo Upload Photo
SD-P-150	Kanji Wasti Building		Albert Street off Zaibunnisa Street	Karachi		Upload Photo Upload Photo
SD-P-151	Rainbow House		Zaibunnisa Street/Albert Street	Karachi		Upload Photo Upload Photo
SD-P-152	Sunderji Hameji Building		Albert Street/Stalker Street (near Zaibunnisa Street)	Karachi		Upload Photo Upload Photo
SD-P-153	Nabi Manzil		Stalker Street/Woodburn Street	Karachi		Upload Photo Upload Photo
SD-P-154	Ismail D. Adam Soomar Building		Woodburn Street/Dr. Daudpota Road	Karachi		Upload Photo Upload Photo
SD-P-155	Rangoonwala Building		Woodburn Street/Zaibunnisa Street	Karachi		Upload Photo Upload Photo
SD-P-156	Abu Building		Zaibunnisa Street	Karachi		Upload Photo Upload Photo
SD-P-157	Allah Rakhi Begum Building		Zaibunnisa Street	Karachi		Upload Photo Upload Photo
SD-P-158	Ekanic Building		Zabunnisa Street	Karachi		Upload Photo Upload Photo
SD-P-159	Emes Building		Zaibunnisa Street	Karachi		Upload Photo Upload Photo
SD-P-160	Excelsior Hotel		Zaibunnisa Street	Karachi		Upload Photo Upload Photo
SD-P-161	Fazal Manzil		Parr Street, opp Zaibunnisa Street	Karachi		Upload Photo Upload Photo
SD-P-162	Hasan Ali Building		Zaibunnisa Street/Shahrah-e-Iraq (Clarke Street)	Karachi		Upload Photo Upload Photo
SD-P-163	Hashim Chambers Building		Zaibunnisa Street	Karachi		Upload Photo Upload Photo
SD-P-164	Ilaco House		Zaibunnisa Street	Karachi		Ilaco House More images Upload Photo
SD-P-165	Lotia & Partners Building		Zaibunnisa Street (Elphinstone Street)/Inverarity Road	Karachi		Upload Photo Upload Photo
SD-P-166	Mohammad Ali Building		Zaibunnisa Street	Karachi		Mohammad Ali Building More images Upload Photo
SD-P-167	Muljee Building		Zaibunnisa Street	Karachi		Upload Photo Upload Photo
SD-P-168	Nusserwanjee Building		Zaibunnisa Street	Karachi		Upload Photo Upload Photo
SD-P-169	Service Building		Zaibunnisa Street	Karachi		Upload Photo Upload Photo
SD-P-170	Speechly Building		Zaibunnisa Street	Karachi		Upload Photo Upload Photo
SD-P-171	Suleman Umber Building		Zaibunnisa Street	Karachi		Upload Photo Upload Photo
SD-P-172	Victoria Furnishing Mart		Zaibunnisa Street/Dundas Street	Karachi		Upload Photo Upload Photo
SD-P-173	Khyber Hotel		Zaibunnisa Street/Preedy Street	Karachi		Khyber Hotel More images Upload Photo
SD-P-174	Edulji Dinshaw Dispensary		Preedy Street	Karachi		Edulji Dinshaw Dispensary More images Upload Photo
SD-P-175	Empress Market		Preedy Street	Karachi		Empress Market More images Upload Photo
SD-P-176	Mandviwala Building		Preedy Street	Karachi		Mandviwala Building More images Upload Photo
SD-P-177	Biramji Building		Preedy Street/Dr. Daudpota Road (Frere Street)	Karachi		Upload Photo Upload Photo
SD-P-178	Faiz-i-Hussaini Building		Dr. Daudpota Road	Karachi		Upload Photo Upload Photo
SD-P-179	Gol Goldenwala Building		Dr. Daudpota Road	Karachi		Upload Photo Upload Photo
SD-P-180	Golwala Building		Dr. Daudpota Road	Karachi		Upload Photo Upload Photo
SD-P-181	Dar-e-Meher (Zoroastrian Fire Temple)		Dr. Daudpota Road	Karachi		Upload Photo Upload Photo
SD-P-182	Sheikh Fida Ali Building		Dr. Daudpota Road/Bohra Street	Karachi		Upload Photo Upload Photo
SD-P-183	Aijiwala Building		Dr. Daudpota Road/Sharah-e-Iraq (Clarke Street)	Karachi		Upload Photo Upload Photo
SD-P-184	Captain House		Sharah-e-Iraq (ClarkeStreet)	Karachi		Upload Photo Upload Photo
SD-P-185	Karim Mansion		Shahrah-e-Iraq	Karachi		Upload Photo Upload Photo
SD-P-186	St. Patrick's Cathedral		Shahrah-e-Iraq, Saddar	Karachi		St. Patrick's Cathedral More images Upload Photo
SD-P-187	Christ the King Monument		St. Patrick's Cathedral, Shahrah-e-Iraq, Saddar	Karachi		Christ the King Monument More images Upload Photo
SD-P-188	Khadija Bai Building		Bohra Street/Furquharson Street	Karachi		Upload Photo Upload Photo
SD-P-189	Tahirali Asgharali Ghatila Building		Bohra Street/Furquharson Street	Karachi		Upload Photo Upload Photo
SD-P-190	A. Mossajee Manzil		Bohra Street/Raja Ghazanfar Ali Road	Karachi		Upload Photo Upload Photo
SD-P-191	Abdul Wahid Building		Karam Ali Talpur Road (Napier Street)	Karachi		Upload Photo Upload Photo
SD-P-192	Baweja Building		Karam Ali Talpur Road	Karachi		Upload Photo Upload Photo
SD-P-193	Braganza House		Karam Ali Talpur Road	Karachi		Upload Photo Upload Photo
SD-P-194	Jama Masjid Qasaban		Karam Ali Talpur Road (Napier Street)	Karachi		Jama Masjid Qasaban More images Upload Photo
SD-P-195	Duarte Mansion		Karam Ali Talpur Road/Inverarity Road	Karachi		Duarte Mansion More images Upload Photo
SD-P-196	Sega Building		Karam Ali Talpur Road/Inverarity Road	Karachi		Upload Photo Upload Photo
SD-P-197	Jehangir Kothari Mansion		Inverarity Road/Abdullah Haroon Road	Karachi		Jehangir Kothari Mansion More images Upload Photo
SD-P-198	Krishna Mansion		Inverarity Road	Karachi		Upload Photo Upload Photo
SD-P-199	Dossalani Terrace		Syedna Burhanuddin Road (Mansfield Street)/Malvery Street	Karachi		Upload Photo Upload Photo
SD-P-200	Haryanawala Building		Syedna Burhanuddin Road/Market Lane	Karachi		Upload Photo Upload Photo
SD-P-201	St. Xavier's School		Syedna Burhanuddin Road	Karachi		Upload Photo Upload Photo
SD-P-202	St. Andrew's Church		Saddar	Karachi		St. Andrew's Church More images Upload Photo

=== Serai Road ===
ID	Name	Type	Location	District	Coordinates	Image
SD-P-203	Hassaini Arcade		Serai Road	Karachi		Upload Photo Upload Photo
SD-P-204	Kulsum Bai Building		Serai Road	Karachi		Upload Photo Upload Photo
SD-P-205	Lotia Building		Serai Road	Karachi		Upload Photo Upload Photo
SD-P-206	Muhammadi Mansion		Serai Road	Karachi		Upload Photo Upload Photo
SD-P-207	Rubab Chambers		Serai Road	Karachi		Upload Photo Upload Photo
SD-P-208	School Building		Serai Road	Karachi		Upload Photo Upload Photo
SD-P-209	Sindh Provincial Cooperative Bank		Serai Road	Karachi		Upload Photo Upload Photo

=== Miscellaneous ===
ID	Name	Type	Location	District	Coordinates	Image
SD-P-210	Zoological Garden		Nishtar Road, Garden	Karachi		Zoological Garden More images Upload Photo
SD-P-211	Honeymoon Lodge		Korangi Road	Karachi		Honeymoon Lodge More images Upload Photo
SD-P-212	Karachi Central Jail		Bahadur Yar Jung Road	Karachi		Karachi Central Jail More images Upload Photo
SD-P-213	Lotia Building		Mills Street/Faiz M. Fateh Ali Road	Karachi		Upload Photo Upload Photo
SD-P-214	Salma Manzil		Mills Street/Faiz M. Fateh Ali Road	Karachi		Upload Photo Upload Photo
SD-P-215	Prince Offset Printmaker's Building		Kanji Tulsi Das Street	Karachi		Upload Photo Upload Photo
SD-P-216	Devadas Building		Altaf Husain Road (Napier Road)	Karachi		Upload Photo Upload Photo
SD-P-217	Hanifji Building		Altaf Hussain Road	Karachi		Upload Photo Upload Photo
SD-P-218	Yusuf Ali Building		Altaf Hussain Road	Karachi		Upload Photo Upload Photo
SD-P-219	Alvi Building		Altaf Hussain Road/Shahrah-e-Liaquat (Frere Road)	Karachi		Upload Photo Upload Photo
SD-P-220	Burhani Building		Altaf Hussain Road/Shahrah-e-Liaquat	Karachi		Upload Photo Upload Photo
SD-P-221	Al-Saeedia Trading Company Building		Sharah-e-Liaquat	Karachi		Upload Photo Upload Photo
SD-P-222	Nisar Bungalows (Police Quarters)		Shahrah-e-Liaquat	Karachi		Upload Photo Upload Photo
SD-P-223	Yusufali Alibhai Building		Sharah-e-Liaquat	Karachi		Upload Photo Upload Photo
SD-P-224	Safiabai Sughrabai Building		Shahrah-e-Liaquat/Serai Road	Karachi		Upload Photo Upload Photo
SD-P-225	Cibbon & Mamooji Building		Shahrah-e-Liaquat/Hassanali Effendi Road	Karachi		Upload Photo Upload Photo
SD-P-226	Hyderabad Building		Shahrah-e-Liaquat/Hassanali Effendi Road	Karachi		Upload Photo Upload Photo
SD-P-227	Razia Zakia Mansion		Shahrah-e-Liaquat/Jai Ram Ram Road	Karachi		Upload Photo Upload Photo
SD-P-228	Karachi Chamber of Commerce and Industry Building		Shahrah-e-Liaquat /Aiwan-e-Tijarat Road (Nicol Road)	Karachi		Karachi Chamber of Commerce and Industry Building More images Upload Photo
SD-P-229	S.M. Science College		Shahrah-e-Liaquat/Aiwan-e-Tijarat Road	Karachi		S.M. Science College More images Upload Photo
SD-P-230	Sindh Madrasatul Islam University		Shahrah-e-Liaquat/Aiwan-e-Tijarat Road	Karachi		Sindh Madrasatul Islam University More images Upload Photo
SD-P-236	Lotia Chambers		Aiwan-e-Tijrarat	Karachi		Upload Photo Upload Photo
SD-P-237	Rawalpindiwala Building		Aiwan-e-Tijarat Road	Karachi		Upload Photo Upload Photo
SD-P-238	Jaffer Fuddoo Dispensary		Aga Khan Road	Karachi		Upload Photo Upload Photo
SD-P-239	Sindh Assembly building (new)		Court Road	Karachi		Upload Photo Upload Photo
SD-P-240	Sindh High Court		Court Road	Karachi		Sindh High Court More images Upload Photo
SD-P-241	Variawa Chamber 14		Sunnyside Road, Belgrave Terrace Road	Karachi		Upload Photo Upload Photo
SD-P-242	Hindu Gymkhana, Karachi		Sarwar Shaheed Road	Karachi		Hindu Gymkhana, Karachi More images Upload Photo
SD-P-243	Methodist Church		Sagheer Hussain Shaheed Road	Karachi		Upload Photo Upload Photo
SD-P-244	Kanji Building		Bellasis Street/Narain Road	Karachi		Kanji Building More images Upload Photo
SD-P-245	Ibrahim Moosabhai Building		Bellasis Street/Narain Road	Karachi		Upload Photo Upload Photo
SD-P-246	C.T.O Compound (Building # 1)		Muhammad Bin Qasim Road (Burns Road)/I.I. Chundrigar Road	Karachi		C.T.O Compound (Building # 1) More images Upload Photo
SD-P-247	Gora Qabristan		Main Shahrah-e-Faisal.	Karachi		Gora Qabristan More images Upload Photo

== Unprotected Heritage ==
ID	Name	Type	Location	District	Coordinates	Image
SD-U-9	Adam Masjid			Karachi		Upload Photo Upload Photo
SD-U-10	Barra Imambargah			Karachi		Upload Photo Upload Photo
SD-U-11	Bashoo Inambargah		Nayaabad	Karachi		Upload Photo Upload Photo
SD-U-12	Firdous Masjid		Khadda Market, Kharadar	Karachi		Upload Photo Upload Photo
SD-U-13	Imam Barra		Joona Market	Karachi		Upload Photo Upload Photo
SD-U-14	Khatri Masjid		Lea Market	Karachi		Upload Photo Upload Photo
SD-U-15	Lakho Shaikh (Baluch) Graveyard		Kharkhro	Karachi		Upload Photo Upload Photo
SD-U-16	PIA Planetarium, Karachi			Karachi		PIA Planetarium, Karachi More images Upload Photo
SD-U-17	Mahal Chabutaro Masjid			Karachi		Upload Photo Upload Photo
SD-U-18	Manhoro Fort Masjid			Karachi		Upload Photo Upload Photo
SD-U-19	Masjid-e-Tooba		off Korangi Road, DHA Phase 1	Karachi		Masjid-e-Tooba More images Upload Photo
SD-U-20	MCB Tower		I. I. Chundrigar Road	Karachi		MCB Tower More images Upload Photo
SD-U-21	Memon Masjid		Gadi Khata, MA Jinnah Road	Karachi		Memon Masjid More images Upload Photo
SD-U-22	Shri Panchmukhi Hanuman Mandir, Karachi		Soldier Bazar	Karachi		Shri Panchmukhi Hanuman Mandir, Karachi More images Upload Photo
SD-U-23	Shri Swaminarayan Mandir		M. A. Jinnah Road	Karachi		Shri Swaminarayan Mandir More images Upload Photo
SD-U-24	Shrine of Kaka Pir		Kakapir Village, Sandspit Beach	Karachi		Upload Photo Upload Photo
SD-U-25	Shrine of Pir Mangho		Manghopir	Karachi		Shrine of Pir Mangho More images Upload Photo
SD-U-26	Stonehenge		Gadap Town	Karachi		Upload Photo Upload Photo

== See also ==
- List of cultural heritage sites in Sindh
