= Civil Lines, Karachi =

Civil Lines شہری لَکیریں
- Municipality
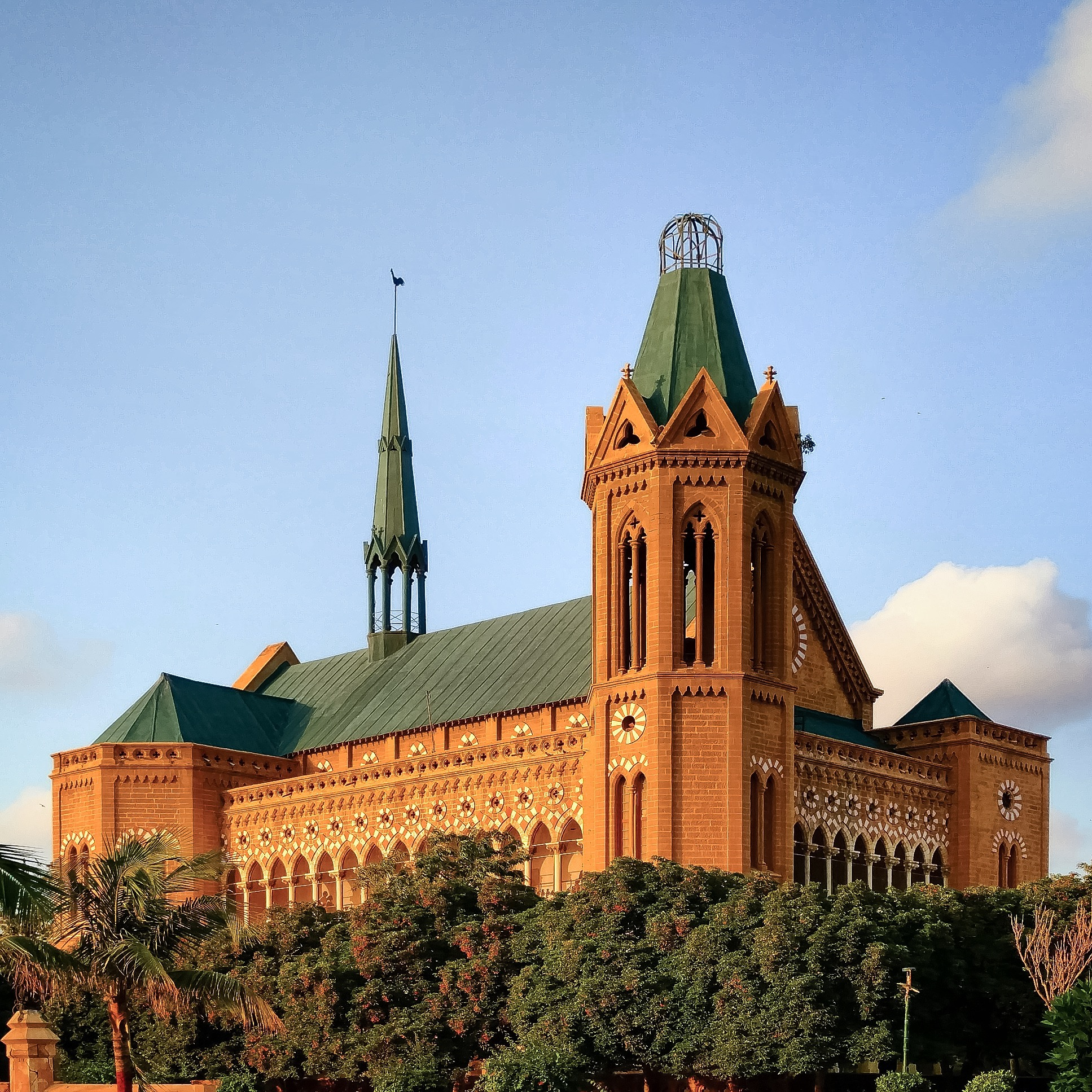
- Frere Hall is one of numerous examples of colonial-era architecture in Civil Lines
- Interactive map of Civil Lines
- Coordinates: 24°50′38″N 67°1′59″E
- Pakistan: Pakistan
- Province: Sindh
- City: Karachi

Government
  - Constituency: NA-247 (Karachi South-II)
  - National Assembly Member: Aftab Siddiqui (PTI)

Civil Lines (Urdu: شہری لَکیریں) is an upmarket neighbourhood in Karachi, Pakistan that was where much of Karachi's British officials and local elite resided during the colonial era. Numerous buildings of architectural significance are located in the locality, including civic administration buildings, churches, mansions, and social clubs.

== History ==
Civil Lines formed part of the "New Town" established during the colonial era, and developed shortly after the British gained control of Karachi from the Talpurs in 1839. It was built to the east of the densely populated "Native Town" (made up of Mithadar and Jodia Bazaar), and was specifically designed to be spacious area, in contrast to the densely populated Native Town. It was primarily residential, and was where much of the British officials and local elite resided in Karachi during the colonial era. To the north of Civil Lines was the European commercial district of Saddar, and to the south the affluent seaside municipality of Clifton.

Following independence, the residential patterns established by the British continued, with Karachi's wealthy residents establishing affluent neighbourhoods in the southern and eastern parts of the city, with poorer areas in the north and west.

There are several ethnic groups with a high concentration of ethncities such as Muhajirs, Sindhis, Punjabis as well as other small communities of Pashtuns, Saraikis, Kashmiris, Memons, Bohras, Ismailis, Baloch and many others.

== Main areas ==
- PIDC
- Bagh-i-Quaid-i-Azam
- Commissioner Office
- Commissioner House
- Chief Secretary House
- Chief Minister House
- Governor House
- Sindh Secretariat
- Shafi Court
- Hotel Metropole
- Pearl Continental Hotel
- Move n Pick
- Marriot Hotel
- Hijrat Colony
- Court of Law
- Dehli Colony
- Punjab Colony
- Hashmi Colony
- Kashmir Mujahid colony
- Frere Hall
- Artillery Maidan

== Demographics ==
The sub-division has a population of approximately 480,480 people according to the 2023 census. The population comprises approximately 265,482 males, and 214,800 females. Approximately 33.42% of the population is below 18. The literacy rate is at 84.8 percent( aged 10 and older), which is 332,845 people. The annual growth rate between 2017 to 2023 is 0.26%.

Sub-division Population change
Year	Population
1998	281,590
2017	473,119
2023	480,480
Population according Pakistan Bureau of Statistics.

== Gallery ==
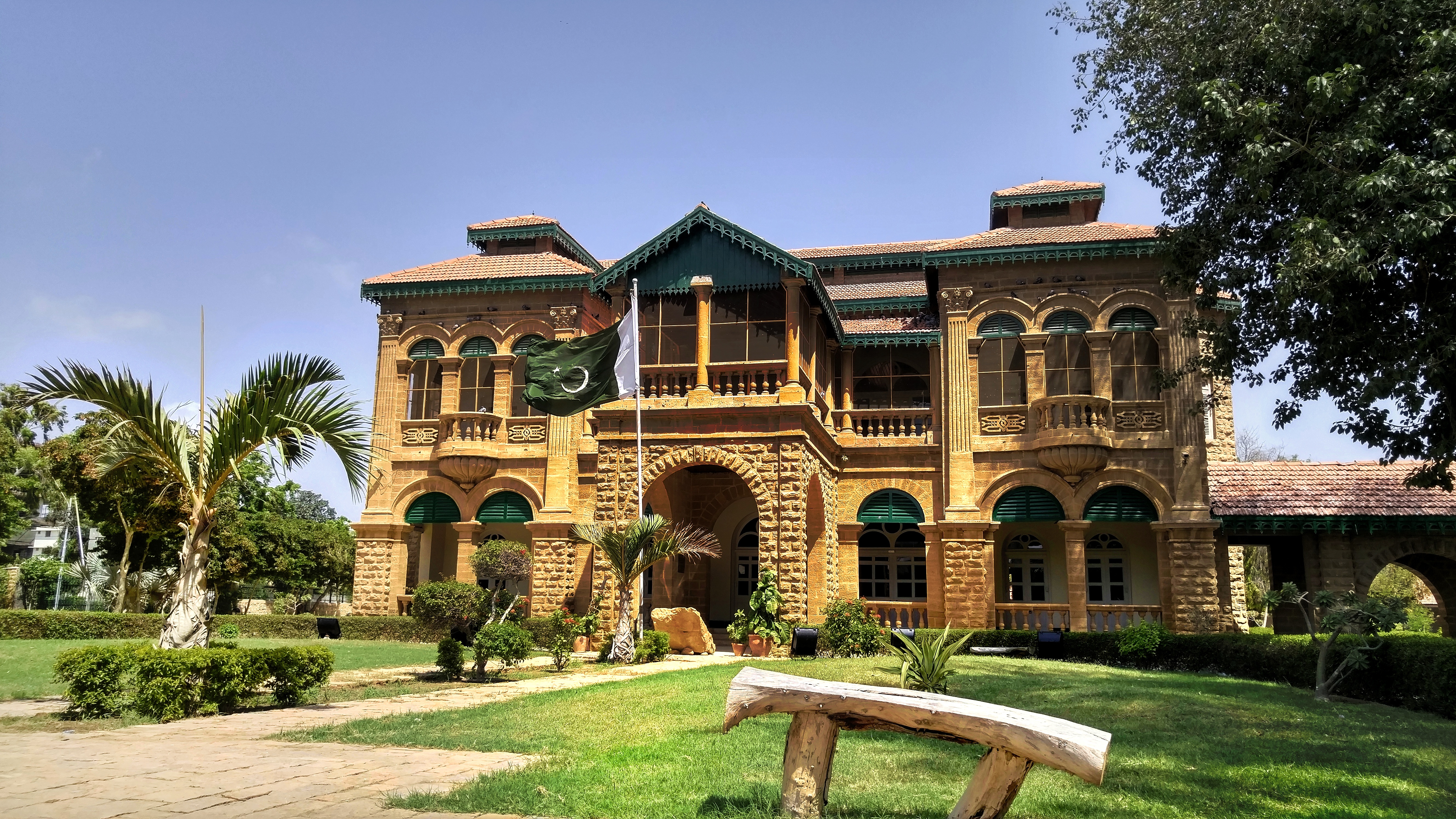
Quaid-e-Azam House is the former home of Pakistan's founder, Muhammad Ali Jinnah

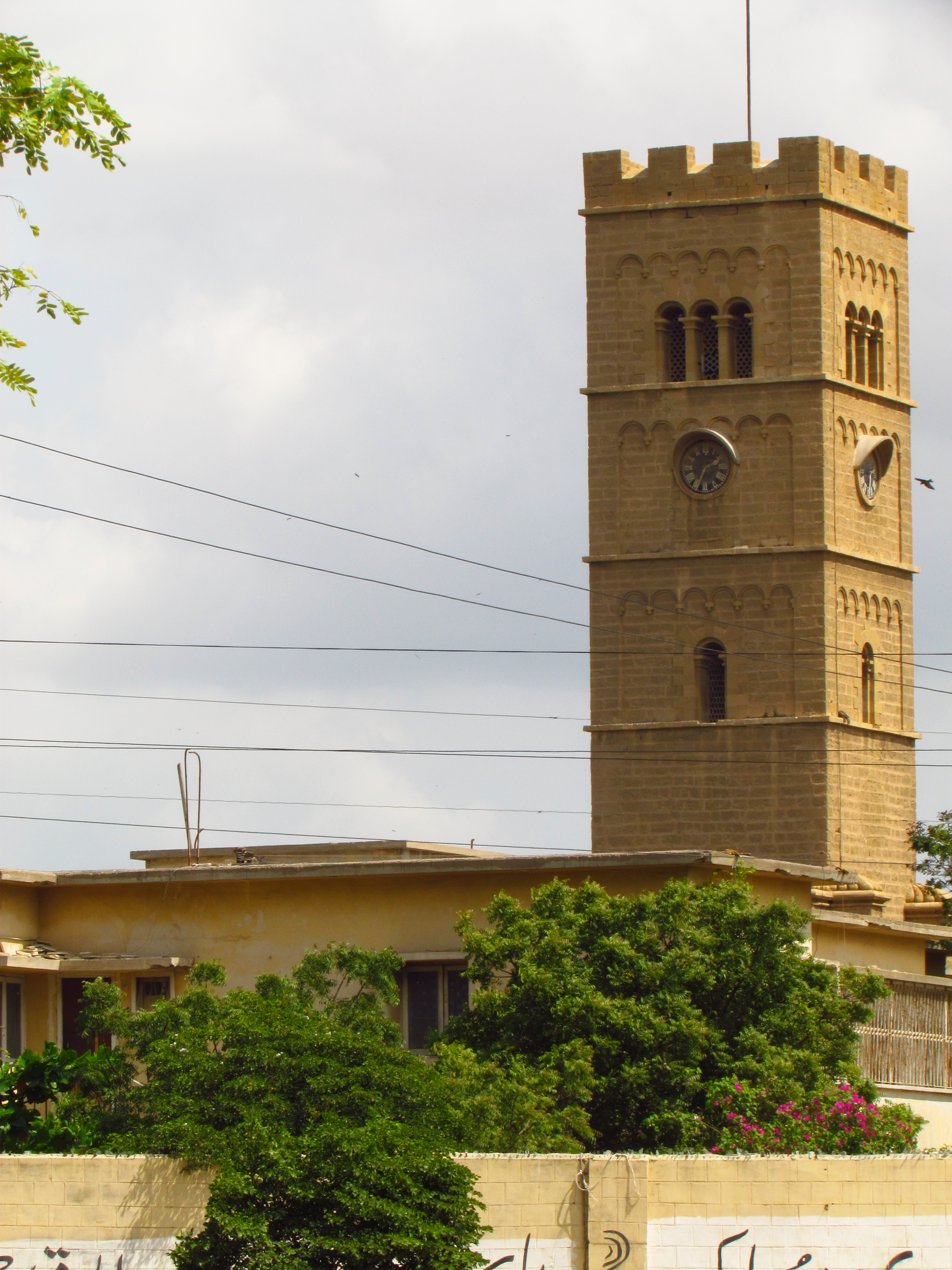
Holy Trinity Cathedral

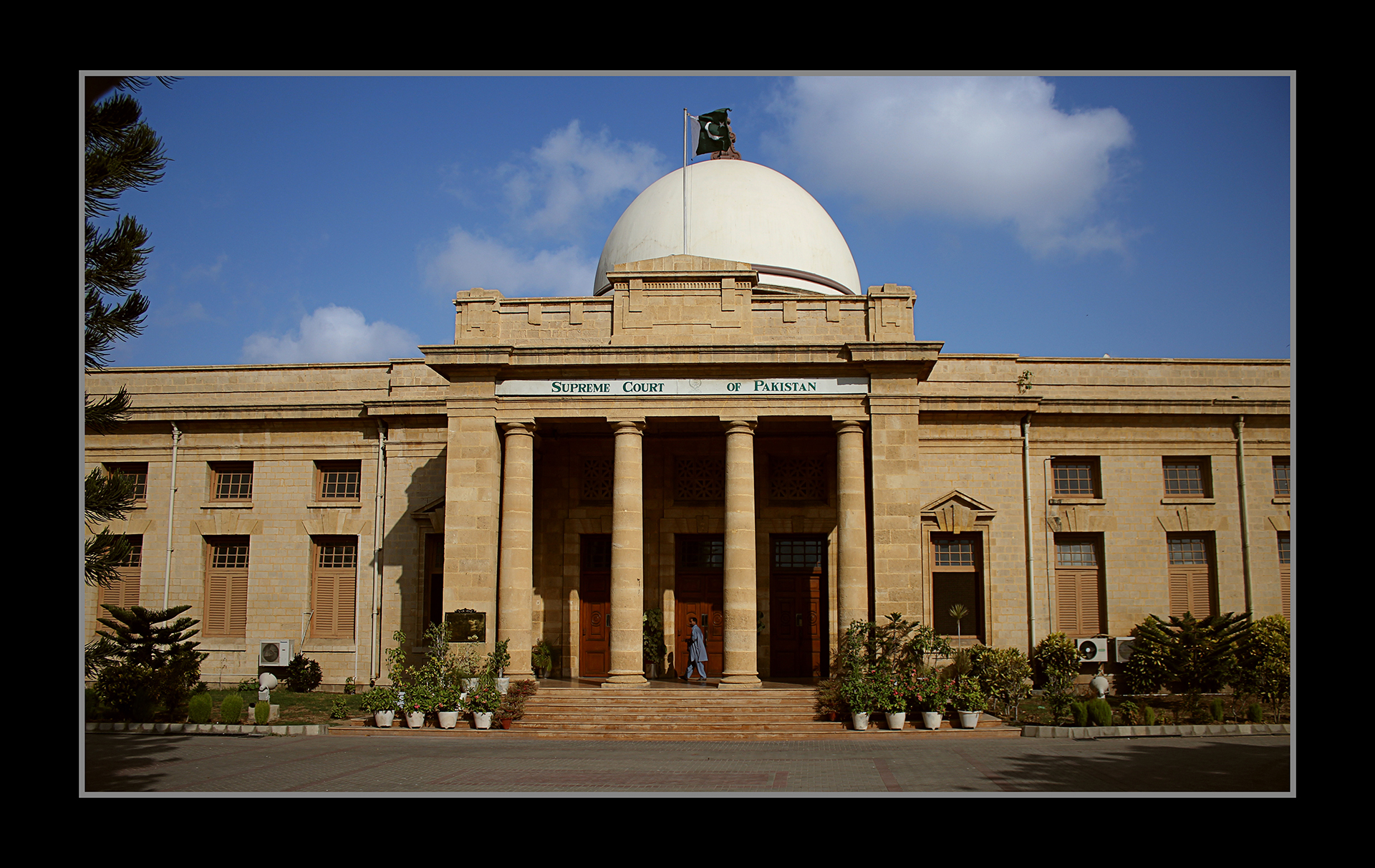
Victoria Museum building

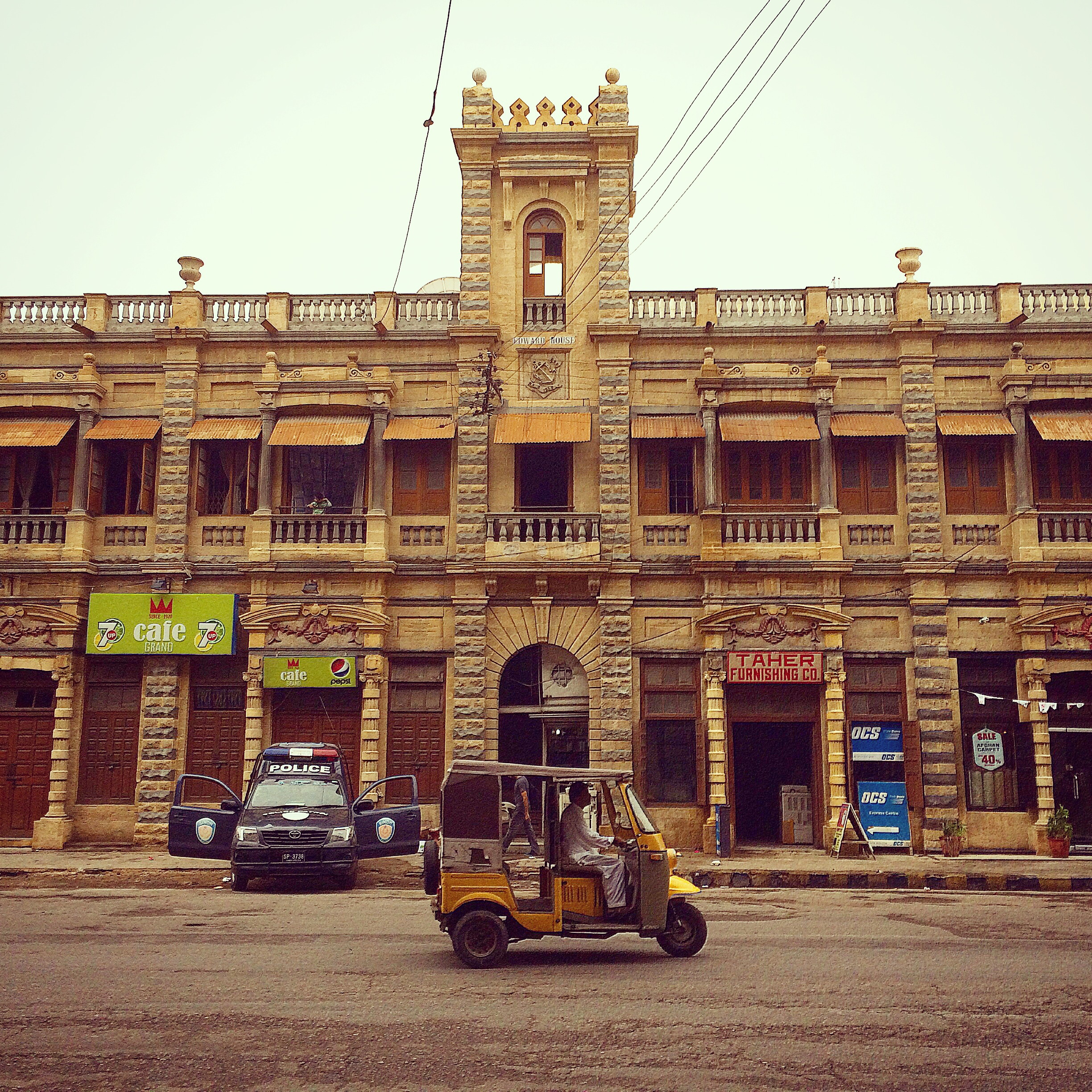
Edward House - one of several colonial-era commercial centres

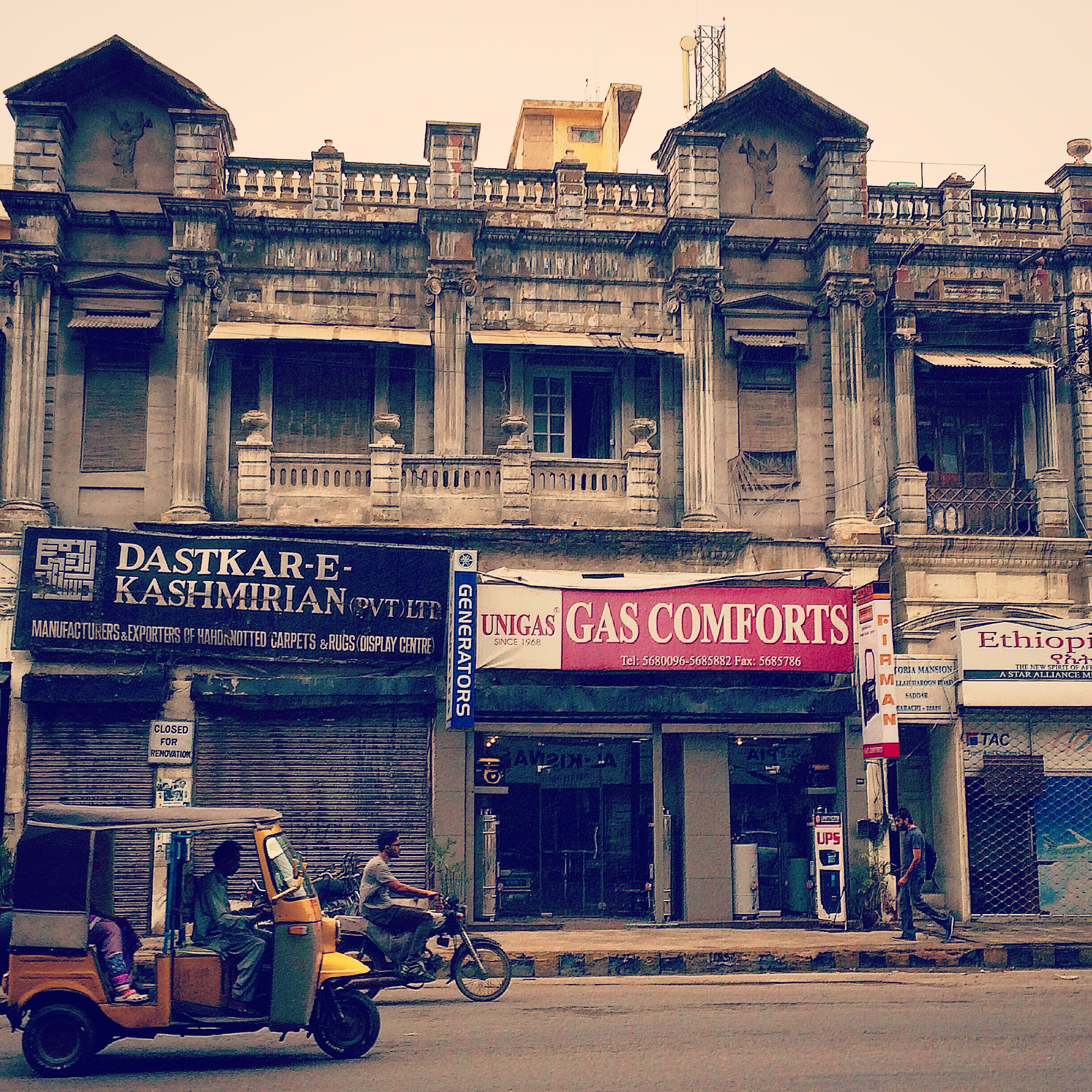
Victoria Mansion commercial building
