= Spencer Eye Hospital =

Pakistani hospital

- Karachi Metropolitan Corporation

Geography
- Location: Siddiq Wahab Road, near Lea Market, Lyari, Karachi, Sindh, Pakistan
- Coordinates: 24°51′50″N 67°00′11″E

Organisation
- Care system: Public
- Type: Specialist

Services
- Beds: 130
- Speciality: Ophthalmology

History
- Opened: 14 March 1940

Spencer Eye Hospital is a public, tertiary-level ophthalmology centre located on Siddiq Wahab Road near Lea Market in Lyari, Karachi, Sindh, Pakistan. Established before the creation of Pakistan, it is generally regarded as the country’s oldest purpose-built eye hospital and has long served as a teaching and referral facility for patients from across South Asia.

It is under the administration of the Karachi Metropolitan Corporation.

== History ==
Spencer Eye Hospital was originally established as Dr Kaikhusrow Nanabhoy Spencer's Eye Hospital on 28 November 1938 by the then mayor Hatim Alvi. It was financed and conceived by Dr K. N. Spencer, a Zoroastrian ophthalmologist and philanthropist whose aim was to provide modern ocular care to the city's poorer quarters. The 130-bed complex was formally opened on 14 March 1940 by mayor Rustom Khurshedji Sidhwa, quickly gaining renown for pioneering corneal graft surgery in British India.

During the 1960s and 1980s, the hospital's reputation for free surgery drew patients from Afghanistan, Iran and from every province of Pakistan. A period of neglect set in after the late 1990s; by 2002 a community-funded overhaul was required to repair equipment, reactivate lecture halls and reopen diagnostic rooms. Further investment came in 2006 when a dedicated diabetic retinopathy and laser photocoagulation department was inaugurated at a cost of Rs 13 million, an official attempt to restore the hospital's "past glory."

Security fears and reduced public funding severely curtailed activity after 2008. By 2013, violence in Lyari had driven patient numbers so low that "even ten surgeries in a day is considered a busy day," despite the hospital's earlier status as one of Pakistan's two premier eye centres.

In 2019, the hospital resumed cornea transplantation after a gap of 12 years.

== Facilities ==
Spencer Eye Hospital comprises an out-patient block, two operating theatres, a mobile eye unit and residential quarters. A city-funded renovation in 2006 re-equipped laser suites for diabetic macular disease, while the 2018–19 "Corneal Transplant Project" refurbished theatres for keratoplasty and phacoemulsification.
