= Mules Mansion =

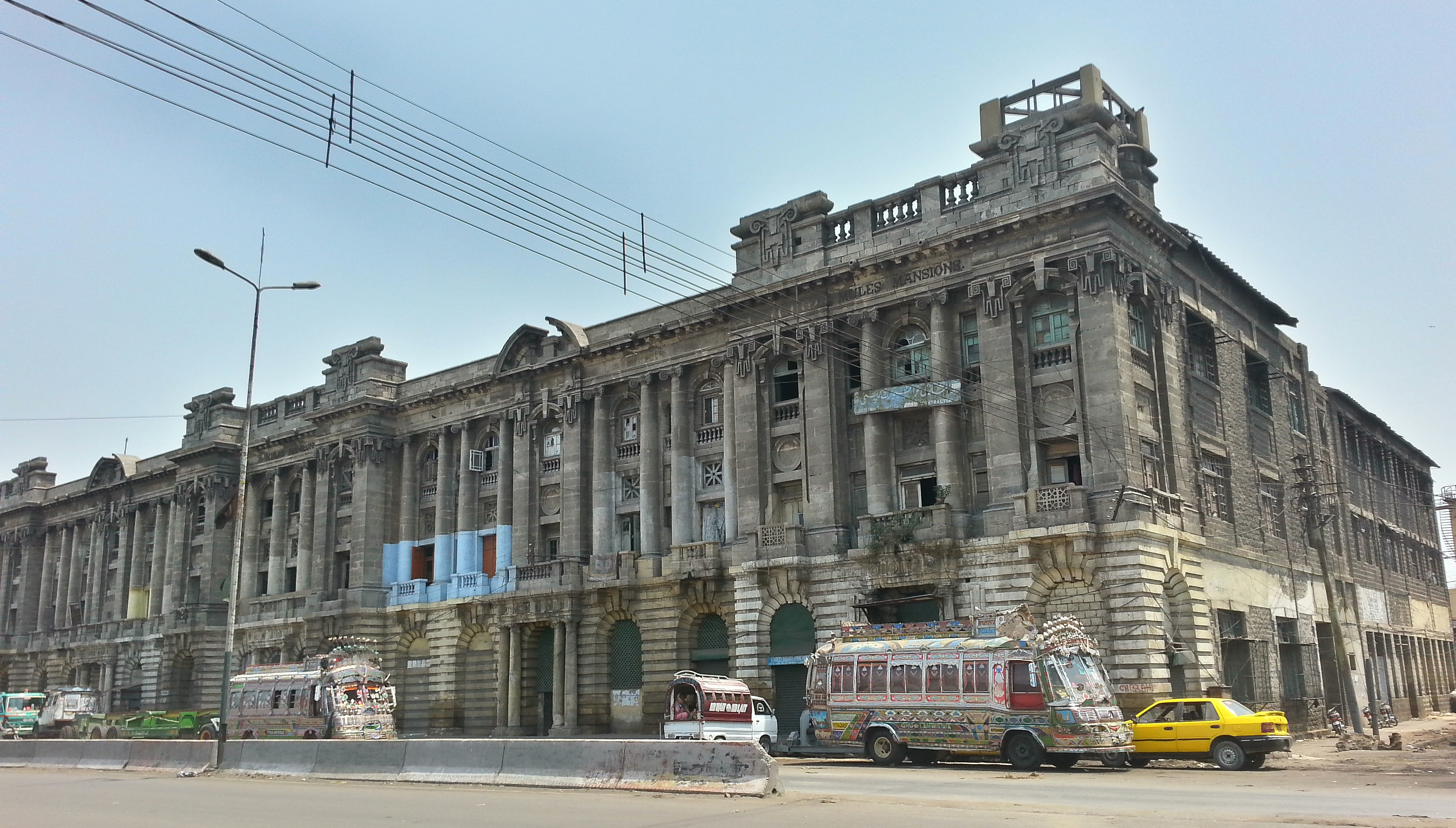
- Mules Mansion in Keamari, Karachi
- Interactive map of the Mules Mansion area

General information
- Location: Keamari, Karachi
- Coordinates: 24°49′11″N 66°58′34″E
- Year built: 1917
- Owner: Ministry of Defense

Design and construction
- Architect: Moses Somake

Mules Mansion is a historic mansion owned by the Ministry of Defense (MoD) under the management of Naval Secretariat in Karachi, Pakistan. It was built in Anglo-Oriental style in 1917 by Moses Somake. The mansion is named after Horace Charles Mules, the first chairman of the Karachi Port Trust.

== History ==
Mules Mansion was founded during the Victoria era. The construction of the mansion began in 1885 using rugged stonemasonry and was completed in 1917. The building was designed by Jewish architect, Moses Somake, and was named after Horace Charles Mules, the first chairman of the Karachi Port Trust.

The mansion was originally designed to serve both maritime and residential purposes. The ground floor housed warehouses and workshops related to maritime activities, while the upper floors provided accommodation for sailors and featured a British-style pub for their leisure. After the Partition of India, the building temporarily served as the Naval Headquarters and later had various uses, including residential. The sailor's hostel and bar were converted into residential flats, providing a home for many migrating families, including that of Pirzada Qasim, a poet and academic. In the 1970s, some writers resided there.

== Architecture ==
Mules Mansion is a complex of eight three-story buildings arranged in a rectangular layout. Each building is structurally independent but interconnected with the others. The buildings face different directions and surround an accessible field, which can be entered from the north side. In the 1990s, one of the buildings was demolished due to safety concerns.

A notable feature of the mansion is the crown-shaped observatory located on the southern side. The observatory served as a vantage point for the original owners, who were involved in the shipping industry, to monitor incoming ships. However, over time, the observatory and other parts of the mansion have fallen into disrepair due to neglect. The Victorian iron staircases, red clay-tiled roof, and some balconies have suffered damage, and the exterior has been affected by environmental factors and pollution.
