= Nusserwanjee Building =

Historic building in Karachi, Pakistan

- عمارت نسروانجی

General information
- Type: Educational Institution (Indus Valley School of Art and Architecture)
- Location: Karachi, Pakistan
- Coordinates: 24.8116°N 67.0156°E
- Construction started: 1903
- Completed: 2004; 1991 (relocation)
- Owner: Indus Valley School of Art and Architecture

Technical details
- Material: Stone
- Floor count: 4 (additional 3-story west wing)

Nusserwanjee Building is a historical structure located in Karachi, Pakistan. It was built in 1903 and named after Jamshed Nusserwanjee, a Karachi philanthropist. This building is a landmark of 100 years old Kharadar and is representative of the historical center of Karachi. It was saved from demolition in 1991 and shifted from Kharadar to the Indus Valley School of Art and Architecture (IVS) campus stone by stone. The transformation is considered to be the largest stone-to-stone migration project in the subcontinent.

== Architecture ==
The building consists of a four-story structure with an additional three-story west wing. The east wing was finished in 2001, and the west wing began its operations at the end of 2004. A total of 26,000 stones, relocated from Kharadar in 1991, were integrated into the IVS campus in Clifton. The building is oriented towards the Arabian Sea, and the continuous exposure to the sea's open environment, characterized by high humidity and strong saline winds, has expedited the expected deterioration of its materials, notably the stone facade.

== Restoration ==
In February 2020, the US Consulate, in collaboration with the Sindh Exploration and Adventure Society (SEAS) Pakistan, provided IVS with a $140,000 grant to undertake the restoration of the historic Nusserwanjee Building. This marks the third conservation project undertaken by IVS in Sindh.

== Significance ==
The Nusserwanjee Building stands as a symbol of Karachi's diverse religious and cultural heritage. Constructed by the Parsi community, it was named after the renowned philanthropist and the inaugural mayor of Karachi, Jamshed Nusserwanjee Mehta. This historic building functions as an educational institution for artists and architects in Pakistan.
