= Jaffer Fuddoo Dispensary =

Clock tower in Karachi

Jaffer Fuddoo Dispensary and Clock Tower
- گھنٹہ گھر جعفر فدو
- Interactive map of the Jaffer Fuddoo Dispensary and Clock Tower area

General information
- Type: Clock tower (former public dispensary)
- Location: Meriwether Road, Kharadar, Karachi, Sindh, Pakistan
- Coordinates: 24.8529°N 66.9950°E
- Groundbreaking: 1904
- Completed: 1904
- Inaugurated: 1904
- Renovated: 1988–1989 (adapted for Kutiyana Memon Hospital)
- Owner: Kutiyana Memon Hospital Trust (leased from Karachi Metropolitan Corporation)

Technical details
- Material: Local Karachi sandstone
- Floor count: 3

The Jaffer Fuddoo Dispensary, also spelled as Jaffer Fadoo Dispensary, is a clock tower and formerly was a dispensary in Kharadar, Karachi, Pakistan.

== History ==
This clock tower was built in 1904. In those days, the trend of tying a watch on the wrist was not common yet. Hence, clock towers in the cities and towns were needed. Many People and workers used to leave for and quit work on hearing the clock tower's ringing sound at their appointed times. It now functions as the administrative block for Kutiyana Memon Hospital (KMH).

It was constructed, in 1904, by a Muslim philanthropist of Karachi, Jaffer Fuddoo.

After completing his school matriculation (10th grade of basic education in British India), Fuddoo trained as a medical practitioner at Civil Hospital, Karachi and established the dispensary to aid the underprivileged in Karachi. Recognized for his commitment, he received the King George V Coronation Medal in 1911.

The facility was leased by Karachi Metropolitan Corporation in 1988-89 to serve the Kutiyana Memon community. The building features solid sandstone, an arched entrance, and elegant windows.
