= Bristol Hotel, Karachi =

Hotel in Karachi, Pakistan

Bristol Hotel
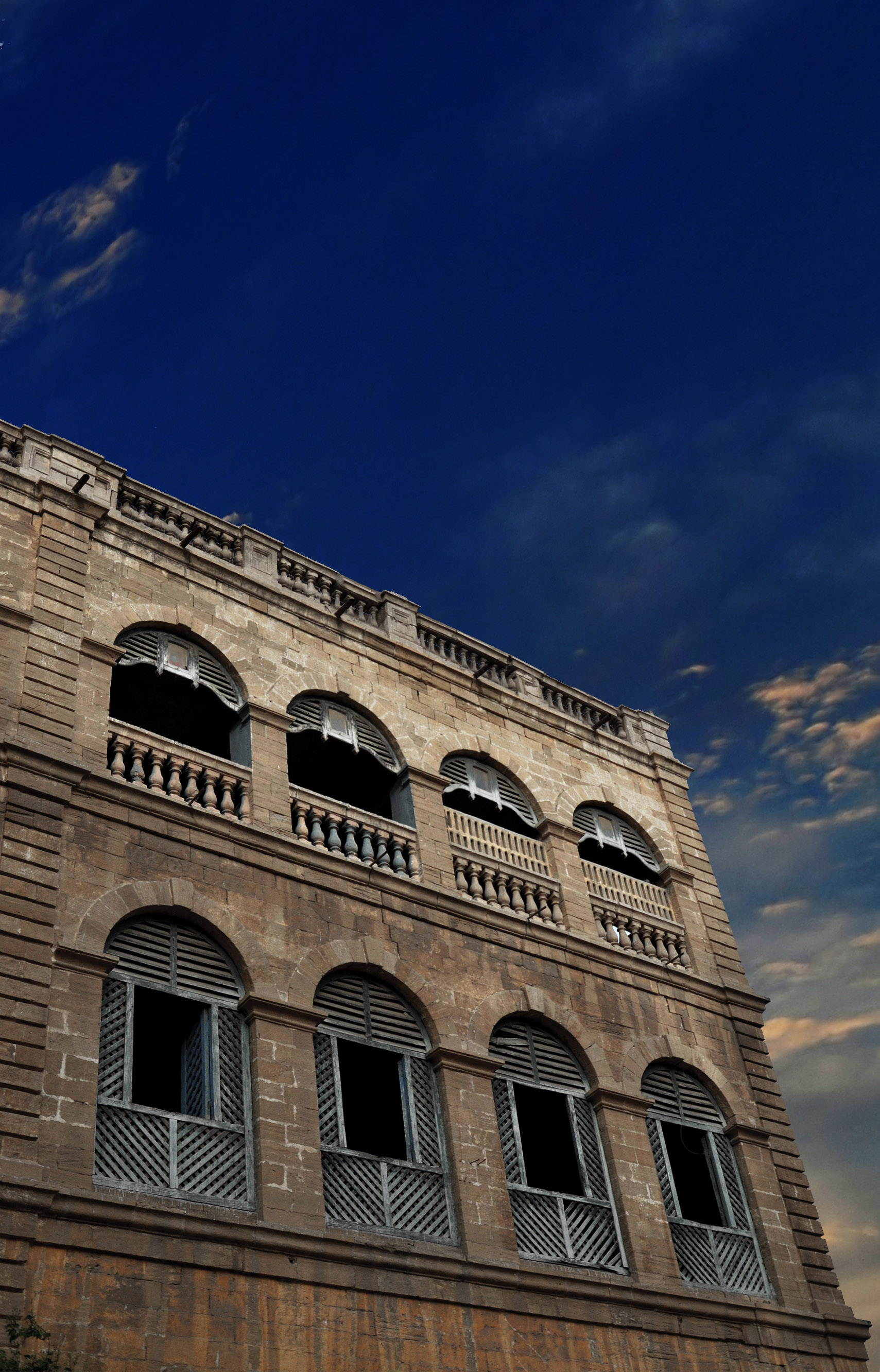
- Interactive map of the Bristol Hotel area

General information
- Location: Karachi, Sindh, Sunnyside Road, Civil Lines Road, Karachi
- Coordinates: 24°50′30″N 67°02′06″E
- Owner: Tariq Rizvi

Technical details
- Floor count: 3

The Bristol Hotel is a defunct hotel located in Karachi, Pakistan.

== History ==
The Bristol Hotel, originally built between 1907 and 1910, was constructed as a mansion for Dossabhai Byramji Minwalla, a Parsi businessman. Notably, it was the first three-story building in the area. The hotel was part of a group of four railway hotels, which included the North Western, Carlton, and Killarney hotels, built to provide accommodation to passengers arriving in Karachi by train.

Bristol Hotel was known for hosting events such as the May Queen Ball and attracting a predominantly expatriate guest list. The hotel remained a major establishment in the city during the post-partition period, serving as a venue for social gatherings in Karachi. Notably, it hosted regular Saturday night discos and New Year parties until the prohibition era under Zulfikar Ali Bhutto.

In the early 1950s, the Bristol Hotel's ownership was transferred to the Rizvi family when Ale Niaz Rizvi acquired it from another Parsi businessman for Rs 60,000. Currently, it is under the management of Ale Niaz Rizvi's son, Tariq Rizvi.

== Guests ==
Bristol Hotel has been noted for hosting foreign dignitaries and guests, including Portuguese officials displaced from Goa. Its guest list also included public figures such as Muhammad Ali Jinnah and the Khan of Kalat, as well as high-ranking military officials.

== Architecture ==
The Bristol Hotel was one of Karachi's first three-story buildings. The hotel featured distinct architectural elements, including stained-glass windows in each room and doors that opened onto spacious hallways.
