= Edward House, Karachi =

Historical building in Karachi, Pakistan

Edward House
- ایڈورڈ ہاؤس
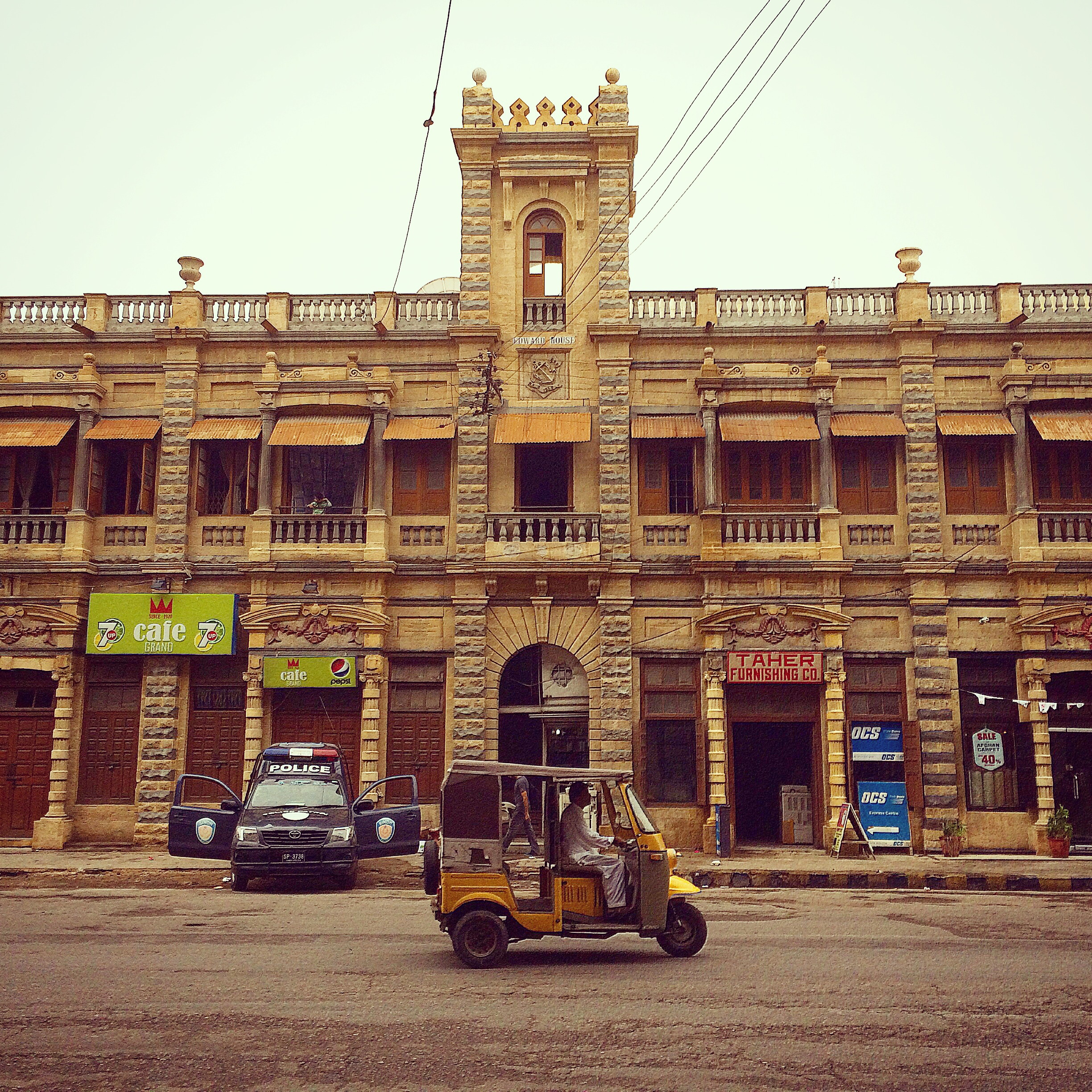
- Edward House located on Abdullah Haroon Road (formerly Victoria Road) in Karachi
- Interactive map of the Edward House area

General information
- Type: commercial
- Location: Civil Lines; Karachi; Pakistan
- Coordinates: 24.850103°N 67.030048°E
- Completed: 1910

Design and construction
- Architect: Moses Somake

Edward House (Urdu: ایڈورڈ ہاؤس) is a building which is located in the Civil Lines area of Karachi, Pakistan It was designed by the Jewish architect Moses Somake in 1910, and named after Somake's son, Ellis Edward.

== Architecture ==
Edward House is made of local Gizri sandstone and limestone, with ornamental molds. Adjoining, there is another mansion known as Victoria Mansion, which may have also been designed by Samoke given the similarity in style - although no records exist recording his work there.

== Use ==
It used to house the Cafe Grand, operated by Herbert Bertie Cumper. The cafe was frequented by Karachi's elite, including the founder of Pakistan, Muhammad Ali Jinnah, and his sister Fatima Jinnah. The building also housed the Stars Club - which was re-established in 2017 in the building.

== Conservation ==
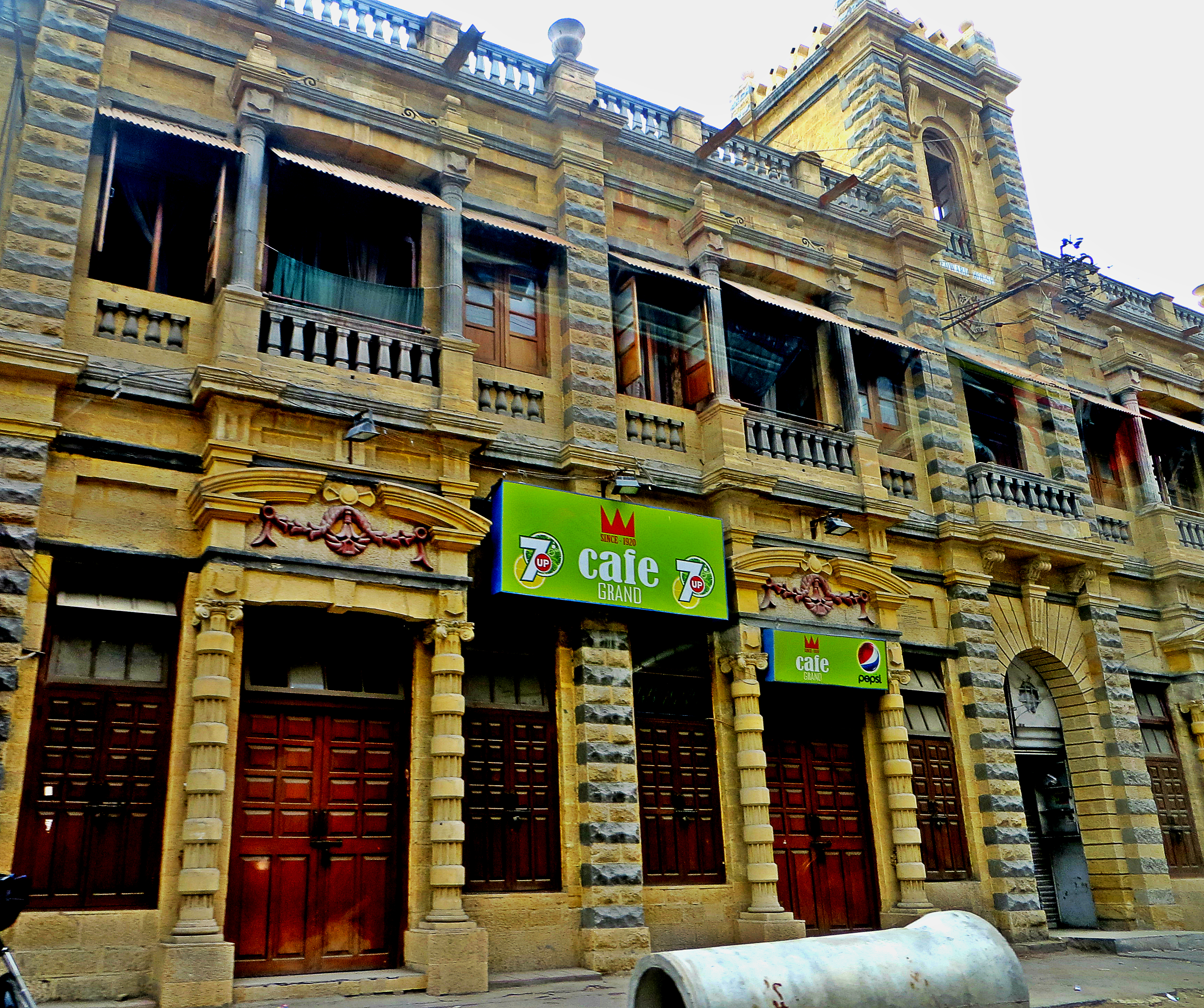
Edward House

The building is protected by the Sindh Cultural Preservation Act, 1994. In 2012, renovation of the house was completed at the cost of Rs. 6 million, a rehabilitation and conservation project which started in 2010. The restoration was criticized on the grounds that the Sindh Department of Antiquities awarded works to an inexperienced contractor who "over-restored" the building, and chiseled away some original stone work in attempt to remove the patina which had formed on the building.
