= Jehangir H. Kothari =

Indian philanthropist (1857–1934)

Sir Jehangir Hormasji Kothari OBE
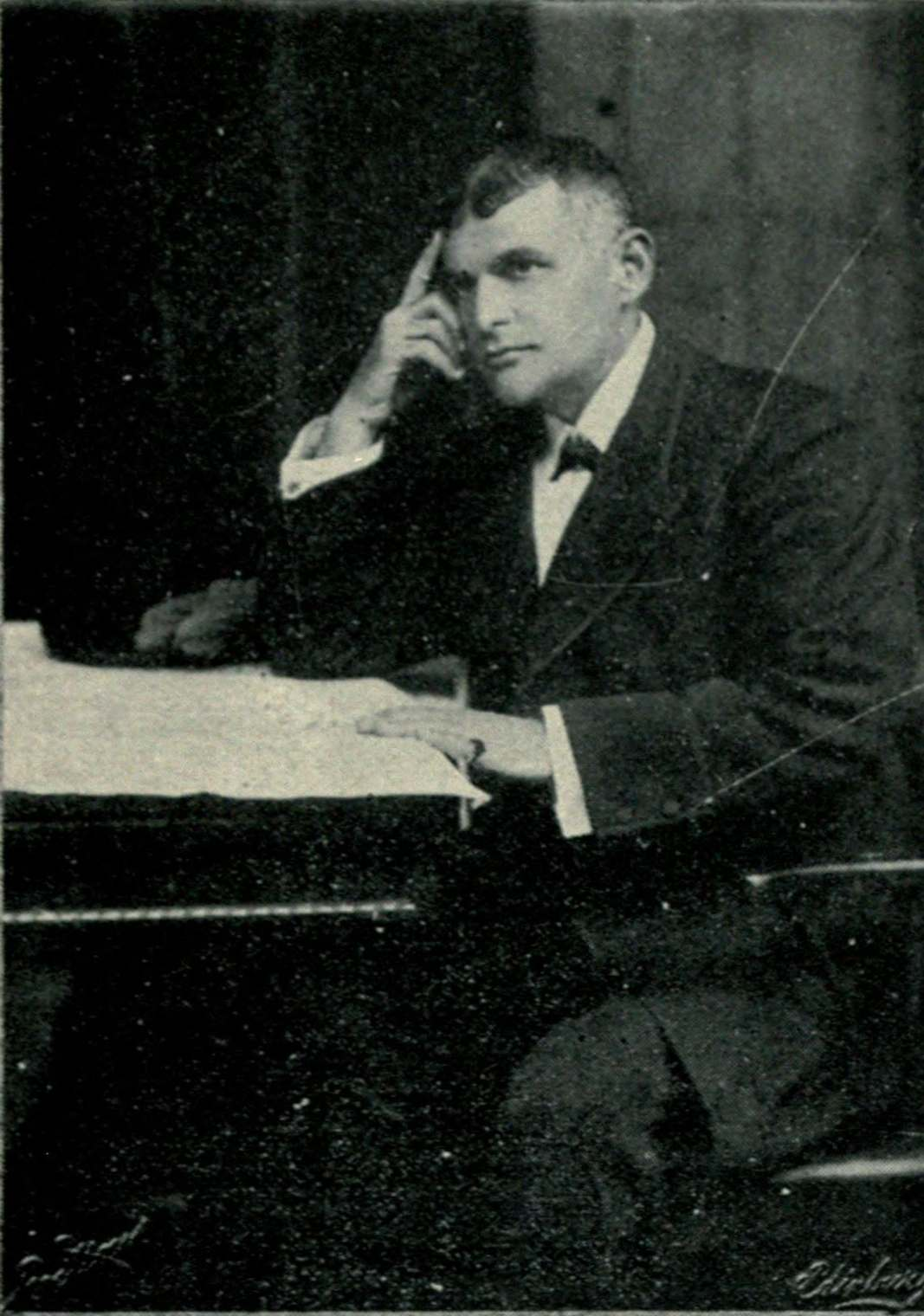
- Born: 9 November 1857; Karachi, British India (now in Sindh, Pakistan)
- Died: 1 November 1934 (aged 76); Trieste, Kingdom of Italy (now in Italy)
- Occupations: Merchant, landlord, philanthropist, world traveller

Sir Jehangir Hormasji Kothari, OBE (Urdu: ﺳﯾﭨﻬ جهانگیر هورموسجی کوٹهاری; 9 November 1857 – 1 November 1934), was a Parsi businessman, merchant and a prominent philanthropist from Karachi during British colonial rule. Today, he is best remembered for the Jehangir Kothari Parade, an elevated sandstone walkway used to walk to Clifton Beach, in Karachi, Pakistan, on the Arabian Sea.

== Ancestry ==
Kothari's grandfather, Hormusji Sohrabji Kothari (d. 1876), accompanied General Sir Charles James Napier as a commissariat agent during the conquest of Sindh Province in 1842-3 and subsequently emigrated from Surat to Karachi, Gujarat in 1846 where he was eccentrically philanthropic.

== Life ==
Kothari was born on 9 November 1857, in Karachi. He was educated at home and in the Karachi High School.

Kothari was a member of the Karachi Chamber of Commerce and represented them at the Chicago Exhibition in 1893 on the second of his eleven known voyages around the globe. He published his reminiscences of his first voyage of 1883/4 when he traveled to Europe, Great Britain, United States of America, Canada, Japan, China, Straits Settlements, and northern portions of India. Some of his subsequent voyages took him to more isolated regions, including the Society Islands, Fiji, Falkland Islands, Tierra del Fuego, upper Amazon, Argentina, Uruguay, Yukon, upper Manchuria, Borneo, Nova Zembla and Spitsbergen.

Kothari was also a member of the Royal Society of Arts and North British Academy of Arts, Life Governor of the Royal Masonic Institution for Boys and Royal Masonic Institution for Girls, Honorary Special Magistrate in Karachi since 1892, member of the Cantonment Committee in Karachi since 1890 and Municipal Committees in Karachi since 1884, Lieutenant in the Sind Volunteer Rifle Corps since 1895, Life Governor of the Great Ormond Street Hospital and member of the Bombay Legislative Council in 1911, fellow of the Royal Asiatic Society and vice-president of the Navy League. He was a patron, trustee and president of many charitable and other institutions in Karachi.

Kothari demolished his house on Clifton Hill in 1907, and at that site he built a magnificent pavilion, parade and pier, which he bequeathed to the people of Karachi to enjoy. Inspired by this generosity, Kavasji Hormusji Katrak built and gave to the people of Karachi the grand bandstand which looms over the cliff. He also established a school for the blind and sanatorium in Karachi around this time.

Kothari was awarded the gold Kaisar-i-Hind Medal (first class) on the occasion of the Delhi Durbar to commemorate the coronation of King George V and Queen Mary in 1911. He enjoyed sailing and was a member of the Ripon Club and Willingdon Sports Club of Bombay, the Zoroastrian Club and Parsi Institute of Karachi, founding member of the Lloyd's Polo Club of Poona and member of the Circumnavigators Club.

Kothari contributed to World War I by investing 2,550,000 rupees or £175,000 in the Third War Loan raised in January 1917, and acting as honorary secretary and treasurer in India for the Imperial War Fund. He performed numerous other honorary duties for the British Government for which he maintained a large staff at his own expense.

Kothari was appointed Officer of the Order of the British Empire (OBE) in the 1918 Birthday Honours, and subsequently knighted in the 1921 Birthday Honours, which was conferred at Buckingham Palace by King George V on 8 July 1922.

Kothari and his wife Goolbai visited Bangalore during a trip around South India in 1923. She suddenly became ill and died, and was subsequently interred in the Parsi Aramgah or burial ground. Kothari built a memorial, the Lady Jehangir Kothari Memorial Hall, to his wife in the Bangalore Cantonment in 1931/2.

Kothari commissioned the Jehangir Kothari Building or Mansion on the corner of Napier and Muhammad Ali Jinnah Road in Karachi during 1934. It was designed with balconies, pillars, spiral staircase and clock tower after the Gothic style with certain features indigenised in the old Karachi style by subsequent additions. Today it is an eclectic mix of shops and offices in a deteriorating condition.

Kothari was an ardent believer in the imperial ideal of the British Empire, for whom he acted as an unofficial world ambassador, and was a member of the British Empire Club. He was convinced that "the British love of sport is the strongest tie for peace", and promoted unity and peace in India through sport, especially cricket.

Kothari died on 1 November 1934 in Trieste, Italy. His estate was administered by Messrs. Barrow, Rogers & Nevill of 26 Budge Row, London in 1937.

== Read also ==
- Impressions of a First Tour Round the World in 1883 and 1884 – Embracing Travels in Europe, the United States of America, Canada, Japan, China, the Straits Settlements, and Northern Portions of India by Jehangir H. Kothari, Simmons & Botten, London 1889.
- Kothari, Jehangir Hormusji page 176 in Supplement to Who's Who in India - Containing Lives and Photographs of the Recipients of Honours on 12th December 1911, Together with an Illustrated Account of the Visit of Their Imperial Majesties the King-Emperor and Queen-Empress to India and the Coronation Durbar by Prag Narain Bhargava, Newul Kishore Press, Lucknow 1912.
- The Life History of Sir Jehangir H. Kothari, Times Press, Karachi 1922.
