= Moses Somake =

British architect (1875–1947)

Moses Somake (6 June 1875 – 6 April 1947) was a British architect known for designing several prominent buildings in British India. His works, built before the Partition of India and located in modern-day Pakistan, include the Edward House, BVS Parsi High School, Karachi Goan Association building, Khaliq Dina Hall, Mules Mansion and Quaid-e-Azam House.

== Early life and career ==
Somake was born on 6 June 1875 in Lahore, Punjab Province, British India, to a Jewish family of mixed Sephardi (from Spain) and Mizrahi (from Iraq) origin.

He spent most of his life in the city of Karachi before migrating to the United Kingdom in the mid-1940s.

Somake died in London, England, on 6 April 1947 from a cardiac arrest.

== See also ==
- History of the Jews in the United Kingdom
  - British Jews
- History of the Jews in Pakistan
- Sephardi Jews
  - History of the Jews in Spain
- Mizrahi Jews
  - History of the Jews in Iraq
