= Shri Laxmi Narayan Mandir =

Hindu temple in Karachi, Pakistan

- لکشمی نارائن مندر
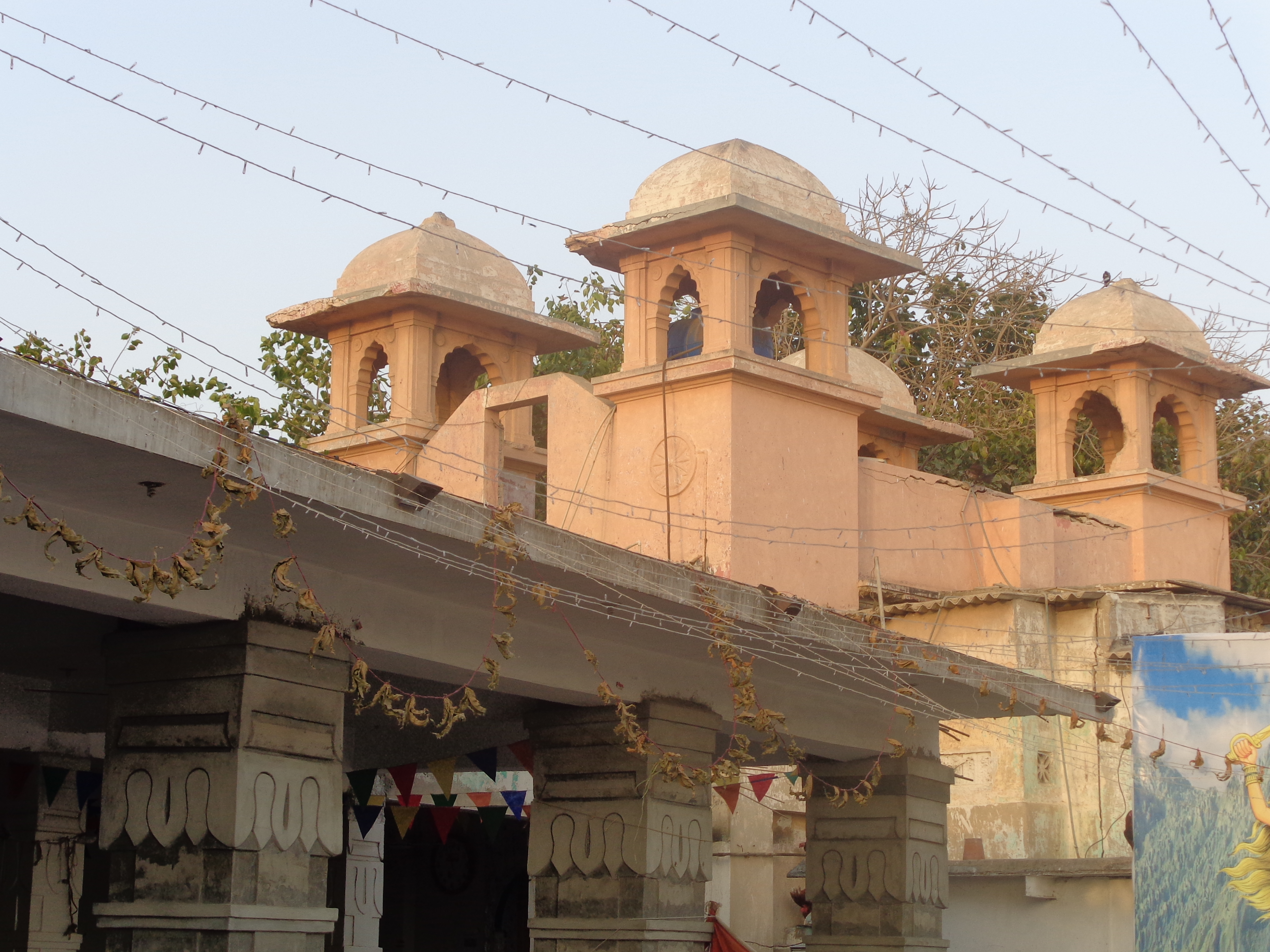
- The temple was constructed around 200 years ago.

- Location within Sindh Location within Pakistan Location within Asia

Religion
- Affiliation: Hinduism
- District: Karachi
- Deity: Lakshmi
- Festivals: Ganesh Chaturthi, Raksha Bandhan

Location
- Location: Native Jetty Bridge
- State: Sindh
- Country: (Pakistan)
- Coordinates: 24°50′40.0″N 66°59′28.2″E

Architecture
- Type: Hindu Temple

Shri Laxmi Narayan Mandir (Urdu: لکشمی نارائن مندر) is a Hindu temple located in Karachi, Pakistan. It is a 200 year old and is an important worshiping site for the Hindus of the local community.

The Mandir is one of the oldest operating temples and the only one situated at the banks of Chinna Creek waters in Karachi.

== Location ==
Narayan Mandir is located under the Native Jetty Bridge, a landmark in Karachi, in the Sindh province of Pakistan. The temple overlooks the Arabian Sea which is an important place for many Hindu rituals.

== Festivals ==
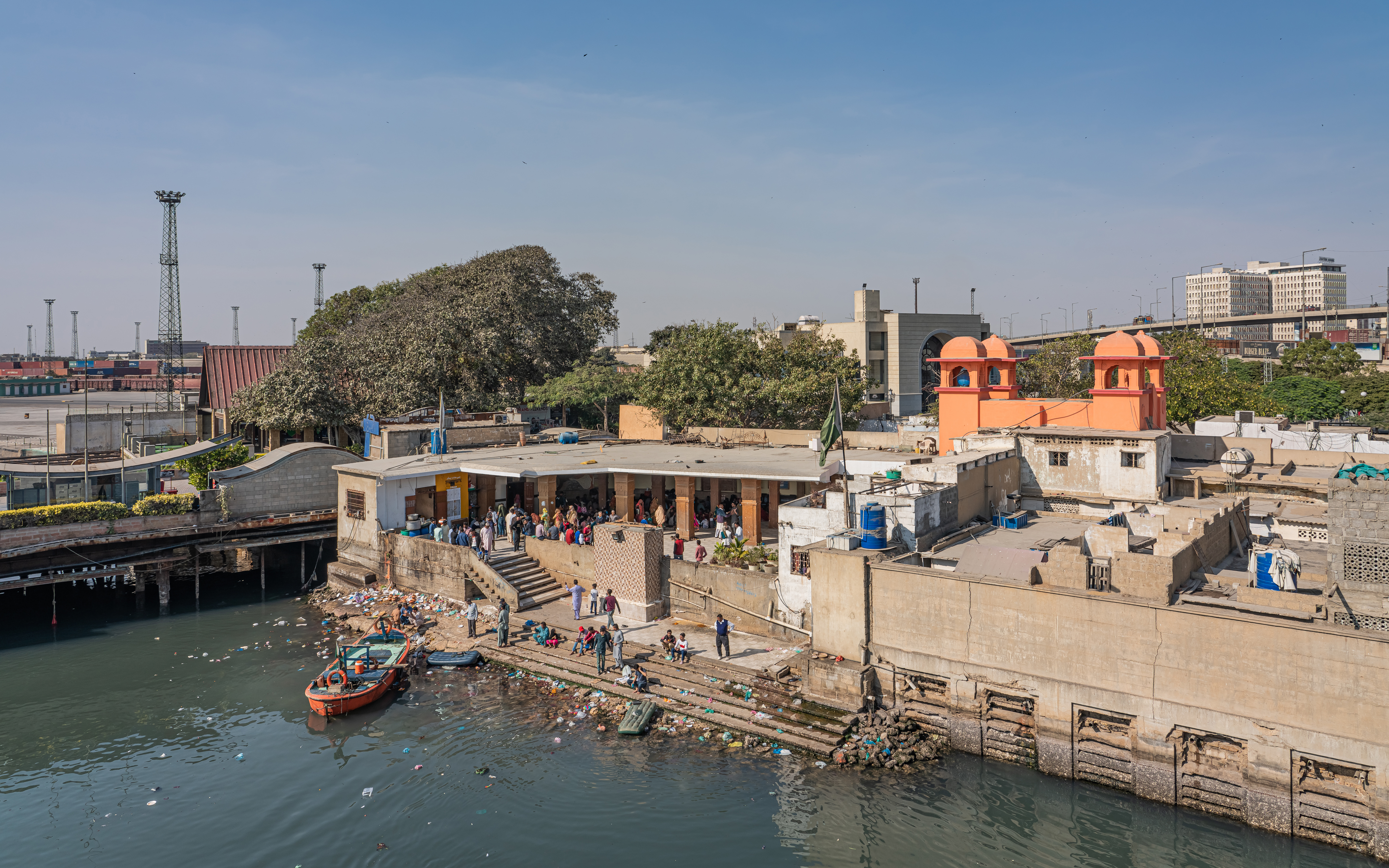
Hindu ghat at the temple

The temple is primarily devoted to the Hindu goddess Lakshmi & Lord Vishnu; however, it is also home to statues of Hanuman and Sai Baba of Shirdi. Main festivals celebrated in the temple are Ganesh Chaturthi, the birthday of Ganesha, Holi, Raksha Bandhan. Hindus come to the temple to make offerings to the gods and to perform death rituals of Karni. The temple is a sacred place for offering Śrāddha and placing murtis of Goddess Durga (after performing garba for nine days) and idols of Ganesha in the sea at the end of festivals of Nao Ratree and Ganesh Chaturthi respectively. Hindus dip and take baths in the waters of the Arabian sea for ritual purification. During monsoon season, Hindu women come to the temple for fasting and to pray for the well-being of their husbands.

== Protection ==
Due to port development activities and construction work near the site, the temple's access to seawater and its integrity are threatened. In September 2012, after a petition was filed by the local Hindu community, the Sindh High Court issued an order restraining the Karachi Port Trust from demolishing the temple. The petitioner believed that Mukesh Chawala, a member of the Hindu panchayat and provincial minister of excise and taxation, was responsible for the construction near the temple site. Hindu families in the region belonging to the scheduled caste believed they were being forcefully re-settled due to "corporate greed and a discriminatory caste system" by influential Hindu leaders and city authorities. The new developmental plan includes construction of an entertainment complex which will encroach upon the temple courtyard. In 1993, the temple was desecrated as revenge after the demolition of Babri Masjid in India.

== See also ==
- Hinduism in Pakistan
- Ramapir Temple Tando Allahyar
- Pakistan Hindu Council
- Hinglaj Mata mandir
- Kalat Kali Temple
- Shri Krishna Mandir, Islamabad
- Multan Sun Temple
- Prahladpuri Temple, Multan
- Sadh Belo
- Umarkot Shiv Mandir
- Tilla Jogian
