= St. Andrew's Church, Karachi =

Presbyterian church in Saddar, Karachi

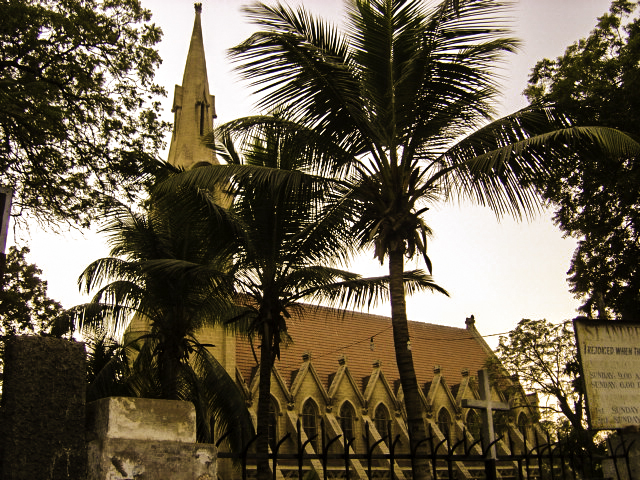
St Andrew's Church

St Andrew's Church, also known as Scotch Church, is a gothic-style building of a presbyterian church located in Saddar, Karachi, Pakistan. It is legally protected under the Sindh Cultural Heritage (Preservation) Act.

== History ==
It was built between 1867 and 1868 under the supervision of the architect T. G. Newnham, associated with the firm J W Poundley and D Walker (Land-surveyors and Architects), for the Scottish Presbyterian mission in British India. The church's foundation stone was laid in February 1867 by commander-in-chief of the Bombay Army, Robert Napier, 1st Baron Napier of Magdala. The church is built in a blend of the Gothic and Romanesque styles, and has a large rose window over eighteen feet in diameter.

The land was acquired from the British government in joint venture with the local congregation. According to the property document the land can not be sold even by the church's congregation or Pakistani government; it is totally and finally for Christian prayer services. The plot, measuring 11,474 m^{2} (123,510 sq ft) is located opposite Jehangir Park (Regal Chowk).

The church was used by foreigners till 1947. In 1969 Urdu services were started by the Christians living in Saddar. It merged with the Church of Pakistan in 1970 when Protestant churches across the country united.
