= Karachi Chamber of Commerce and Industry Building =

Historic building in Karachi, Pakistan

Karachi Chamber of Commerce & Industry Building
- کے سی سی آئی بلڈنگ
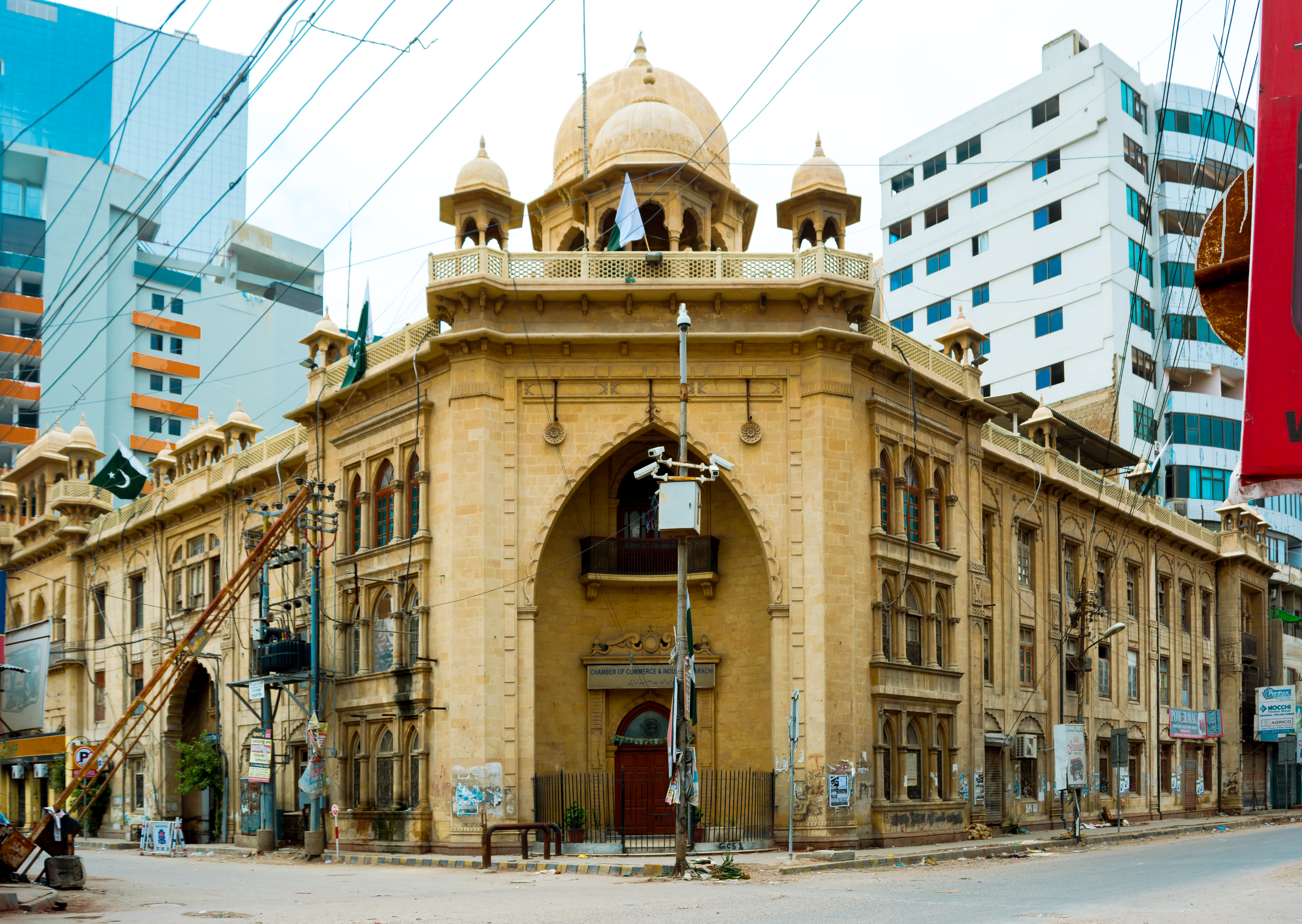

General information
- Architectural style: Anglo-Mughal
- Location: Serai Quarter, Karachi, Pakistan
- Coordinates: 24.8509°N 67.0034°E
- Completed: 1934

Technical details
- Material: Sandstone

Design and construction
- Architect: Ahmed Hussain Agha

The Karachi Chamber of Commerce and Industry Building, also known as the KCCI Building, is a heritage building in central Karachi, Pakistan dating from 1934. Its foundation stone was laid by Gandhi in July 1934. It currently serves as headquarters for the Karachi Chamber of Commerce & Industry.

== History ==
Mahatma Gandhi laid the foundation stone for the building on July 8, 1934, to serve as the headquarters of the Karachi Indian Merchants' Association. It was constructed on a 3,553 square metre plot purchased for 114,750 rupees. Following independence, the building was the site of the first meeting of the Central Board of Directors in 1949 for the new National Bank of Pakistan. It was declared a protected heritage site on 7 September 1995. Although the exterior remains largely unchanged from its original design, the interior has been heavily modified over time.

== Architecture ==
Ahmed Hussain Agha designed the structure in the Mughal-revival style known as Anglo-Mughal, which was popular in the 1920s. Most earlier buildings in Karachi relied heavily on a European style of architectures, such as the Frere Hall, Khaliq Dina Hall, and Karachi Port Trust Building. The KCCI Building differs from earlier civic structures in the city in that it is heavily influenced by Mughal architecture. Other Karachi buildings built in the same style include the Mohatta Palace, Karachi Metropolitan Corporation Building, and Hindu Gymkhana.

It was constructed of sandstone, with some materials brought from Jaipur, now in the Indian state of Rajasthan.

== Gallery ==
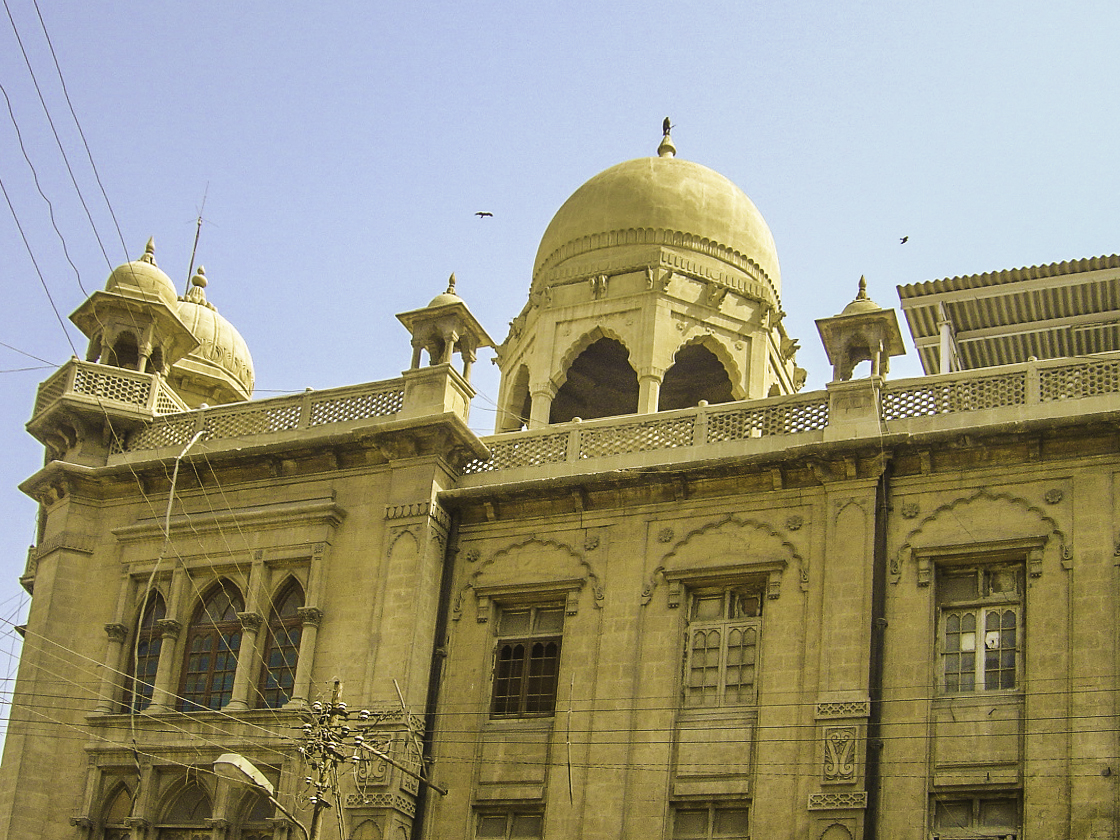
The building has domes and faux-minarets that are Mughal in style

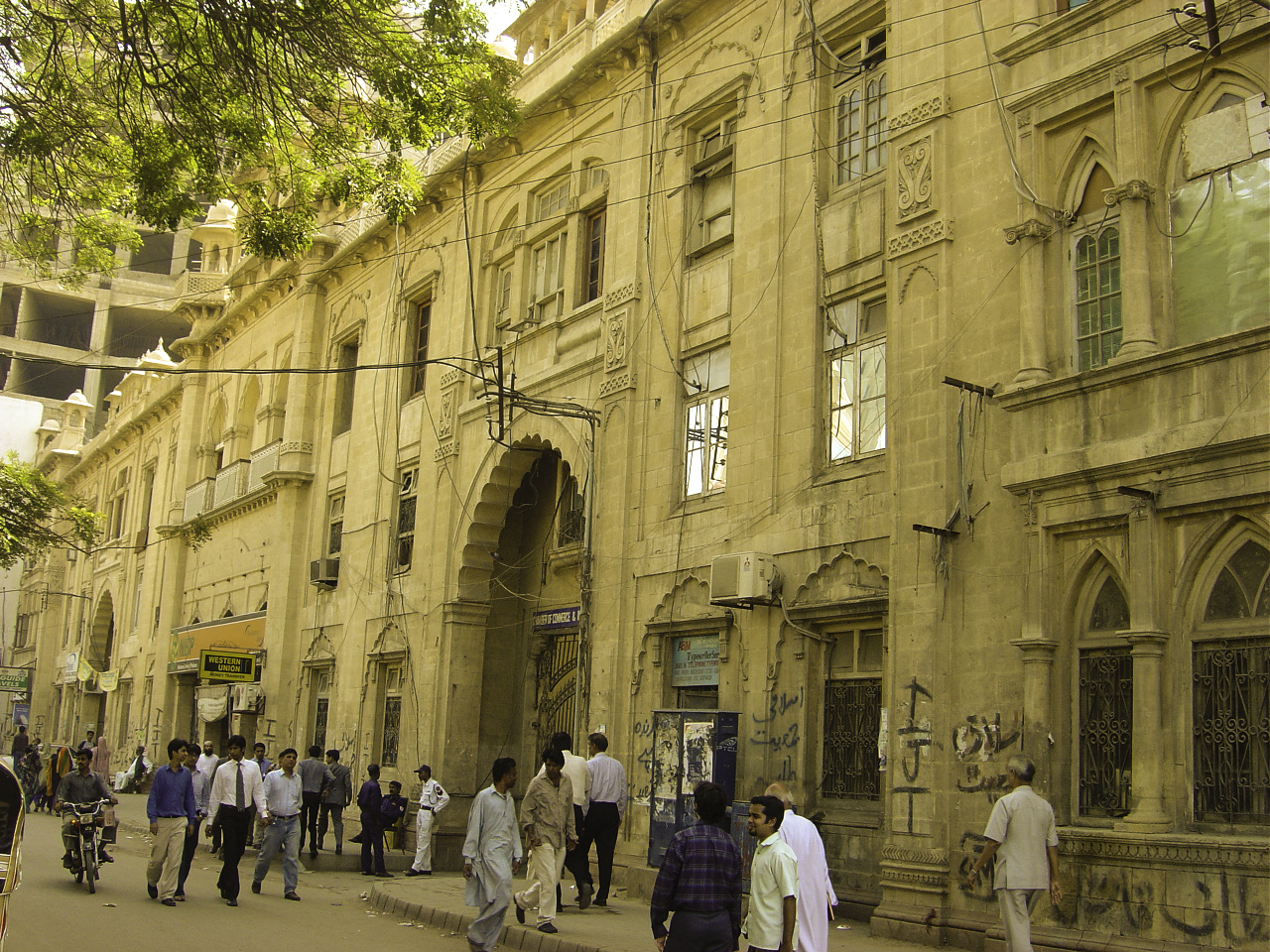
The building is made of sandstone

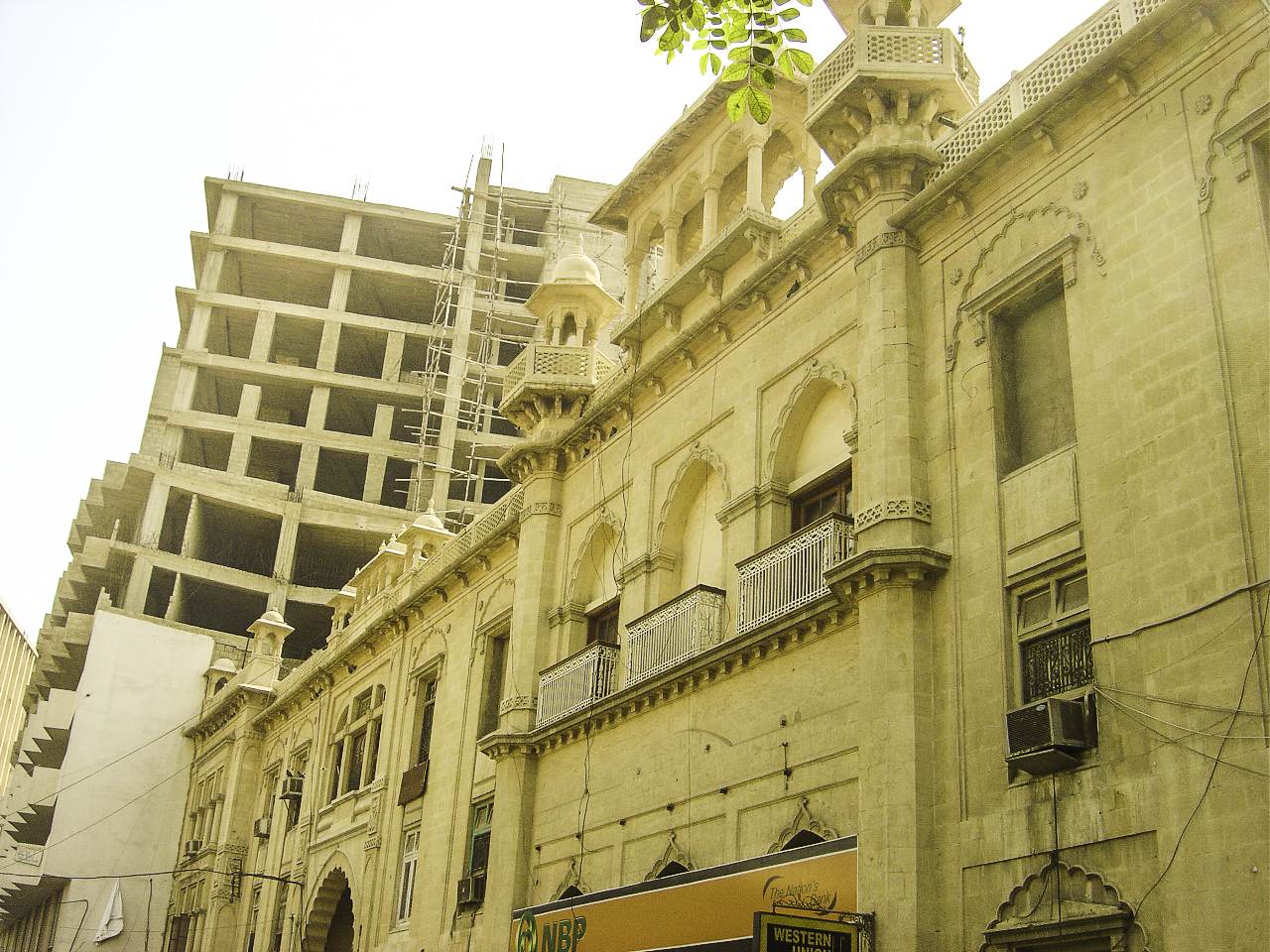
Mughal-inspired details

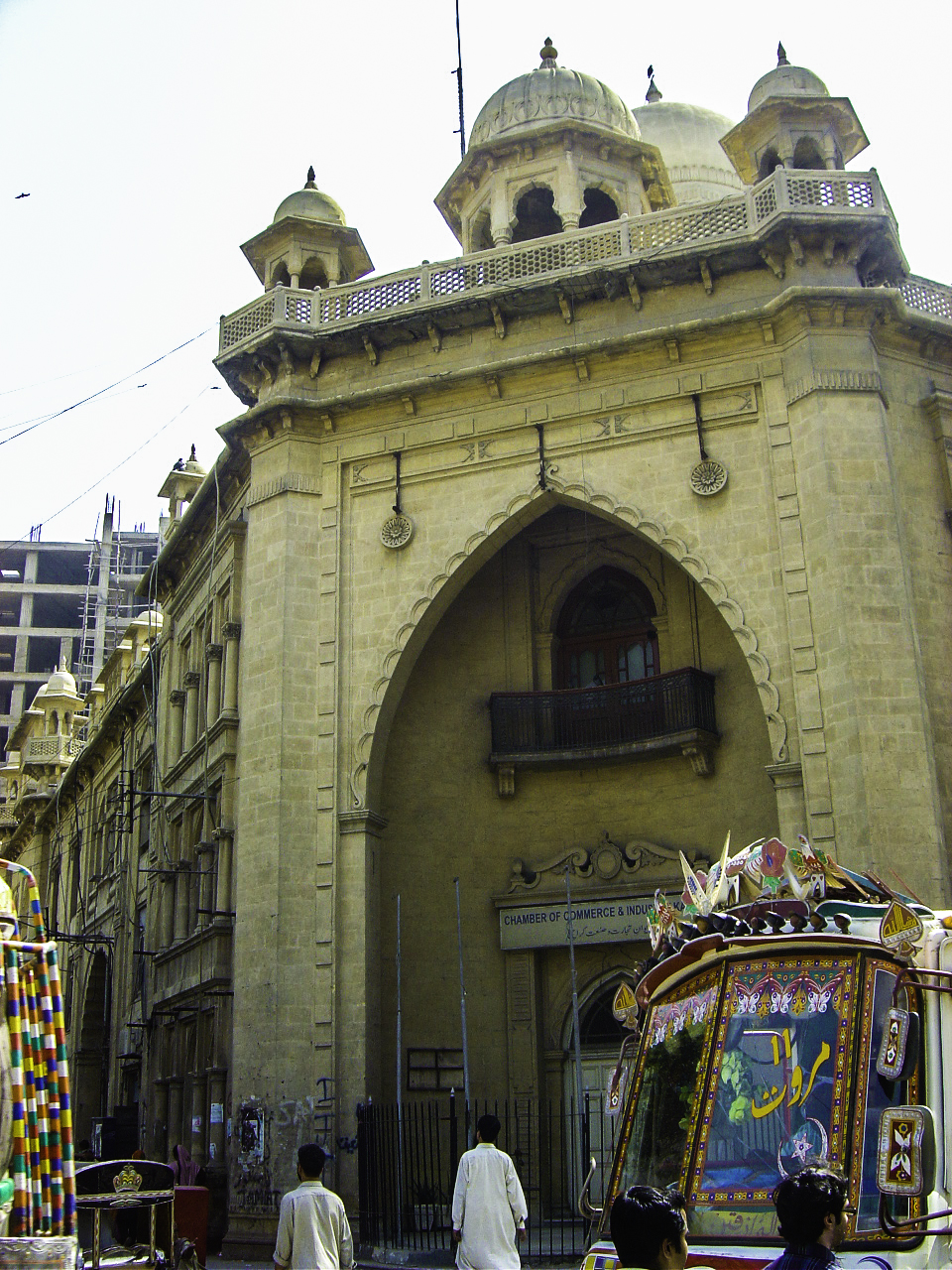
The front of the building has a large Islamic style arch
