= Horace Charles Mules =

British civil servant and colonial administrator

Sir Horace Charles Mules CSI, OBE, MVO (23 March 1856 – 9 April 1939) was a British civil servant and colonial administrator. He served as Commissioner in Sind from 1903 to 1904.

Mules was born in Honiton, Devon, and was educated at Wellington College. He was knighted in the 1919 Birthday Honours. He died in London in 1939.

Government offices
Preceded by Alexander Cumine	Commissioner in Sind; 1903–1904	Succeeded by John William Pitt Muir-Mackenzie
