= Victoria Museum, Karachi =

Victoria Museum
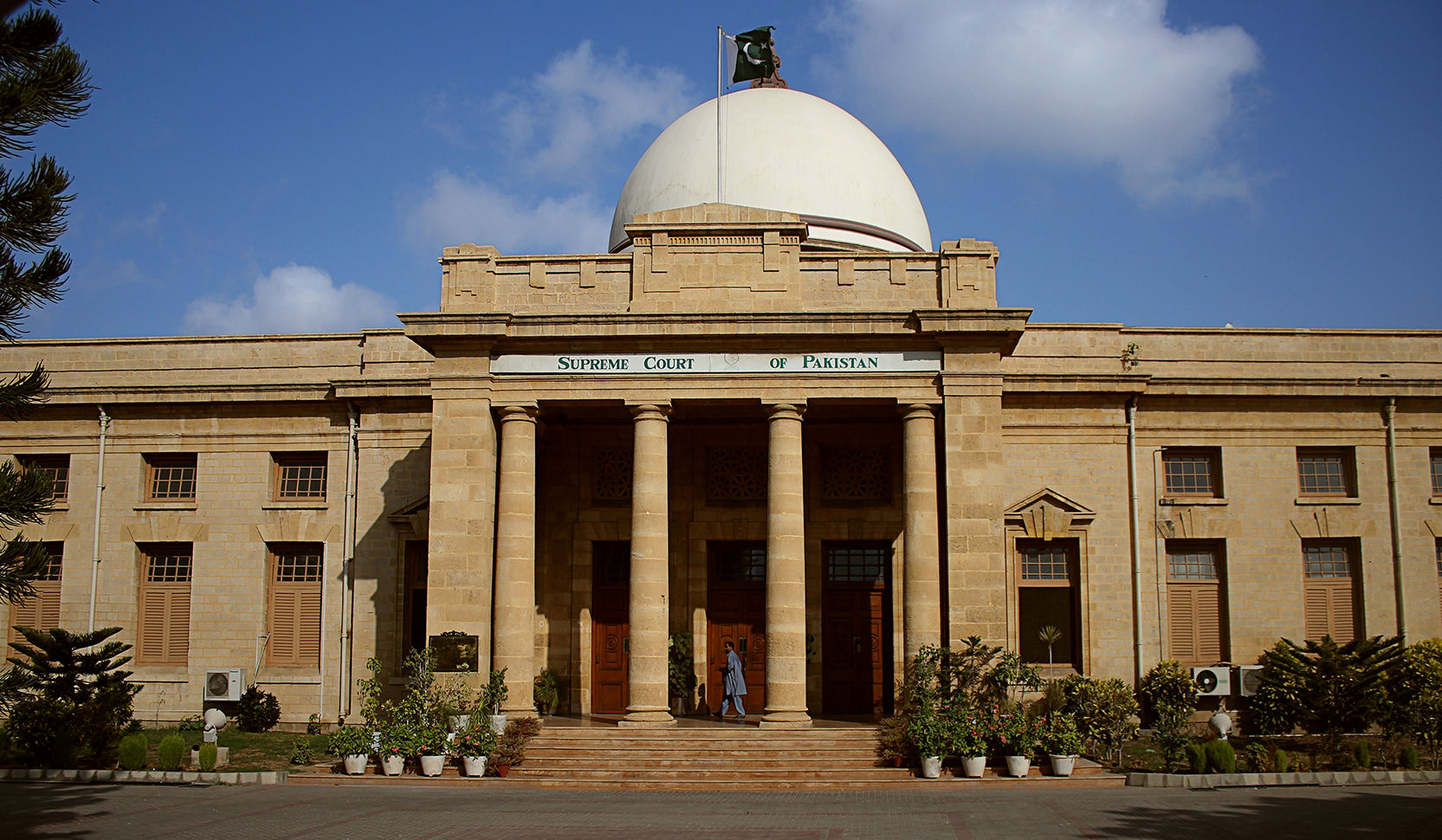
- Victoria Museum which is now the Supreme Court Registry in Karachi
- Interactive map of the Victoria Museum area

General information
- Location: Karachi, Sindh
- Coordinates: 24°51′06″N 67°01′09″E
- Year built: 1887
- Owner: Supreme Court of Pakistan

Victoria Museum, now called Supreme Court Registry, Karachi, founded as Victoria and Albert Museum, is a building in Karachi, Sindh, which houses the Supreme Court of Pakistan Karachi registry branch.

== History ==
The building was originally built during the British Raj. It was founded by the Duke of Connaught in 1887 during the reign of Queen Victoria as a museum then known as Victoria and Elbert [sic] Museum.

On 21 May 1892, it was converted into a full museum and named Victoria Museum. It had stuffed animals, artefacts from the Mohenjo-daro, statues of people of Hind and abroad, portraits, paintings, and pictures of noted people from around the world.

In July 1948, Muhammad Ali Jinnah inaugurated it as the State Bank of Pakistan building and is noted for Jinnah's historic speech which articulates his vision for Pakistan.

In October 1957, an apex court registry was established in Karachi in the building.

In May 1995, the Government of Sindh transferred ownership of the building to the Supreme Court of Pakistan. Following some renovations, the Supreme Court Registry was officially inaugurated on February 20, 1997.

== Architecture ==
The building was designed in Victorian architecture. It features three courtrooms, the Chief Justice's chambers, six judges' chambers, registrar's chambers, a conference room, a judges' lounge, an office block, and a mosque. It also houses additional rooms for the Supreme Court Bar Association.
