= Lea Market =

Lea Market لی مارکیٹ
- Marketplace
- Country: Pakistan
- Province: Sindh
- City: Karachi
- Founded: 1927
- Named for: Mesham Lea

Lea Market is a marketplace located in Karachi, Pakistan. It is named after a British engineer, Measham Lea, for his contributions in the development of the city.

The vendors in the market sell dairy products, fish, meat, and vegetables. There is also an old clock tower at the market.

== History ==
The marketplace was built in 1927 and was named after a British engineer, Mesham Lea. It was once a major trading hub of the city.

Originally, the market consisted of three two-storey buildings. An additional building was added later to accommodate meat sellers during the rule of Ayub Khan.
