= Holy Trinity Cathedral, Karachi =

Coordinates: 24.852°N 67.030°E

Holy Trinity Cathedral
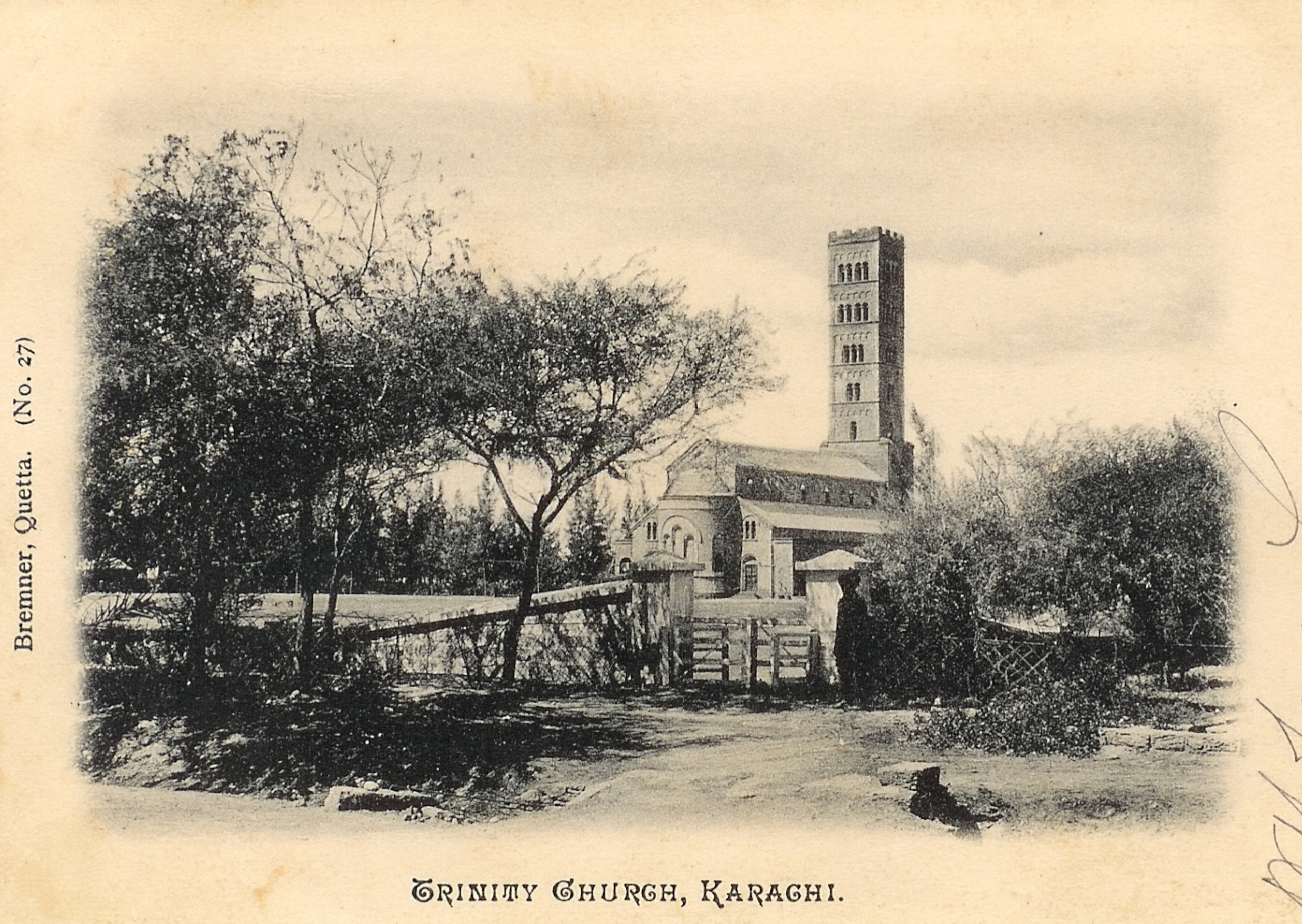
- Exterior of the cathedral, a postcard in 1904/1906.
- Holy Trinity Cathedral
- Location: Fatima Jinnah Road, Karachi
- Country: Pakistan
- Denomination: Church of Pakistan

History
- Founded: 1844
- Founder: British military
- Dedication: 1855

Architecture
- Architectural type: Cathedral
- Style: Gothic

Administration
- Archdiocese: Diocese of Karachi

Holy Trinity Cathedral is the seat of the Church of Pakistan's Diocese of Karachi, situated on Fatima Jinnah Road, near Zainab Market, in Karachi, Pakistan. It was founded in 1855 as a church within the Church of India, Burma and Ceylon before being elevated to a cathedral in 1970 following the establishment of the Church of Pakistan.

== History ==
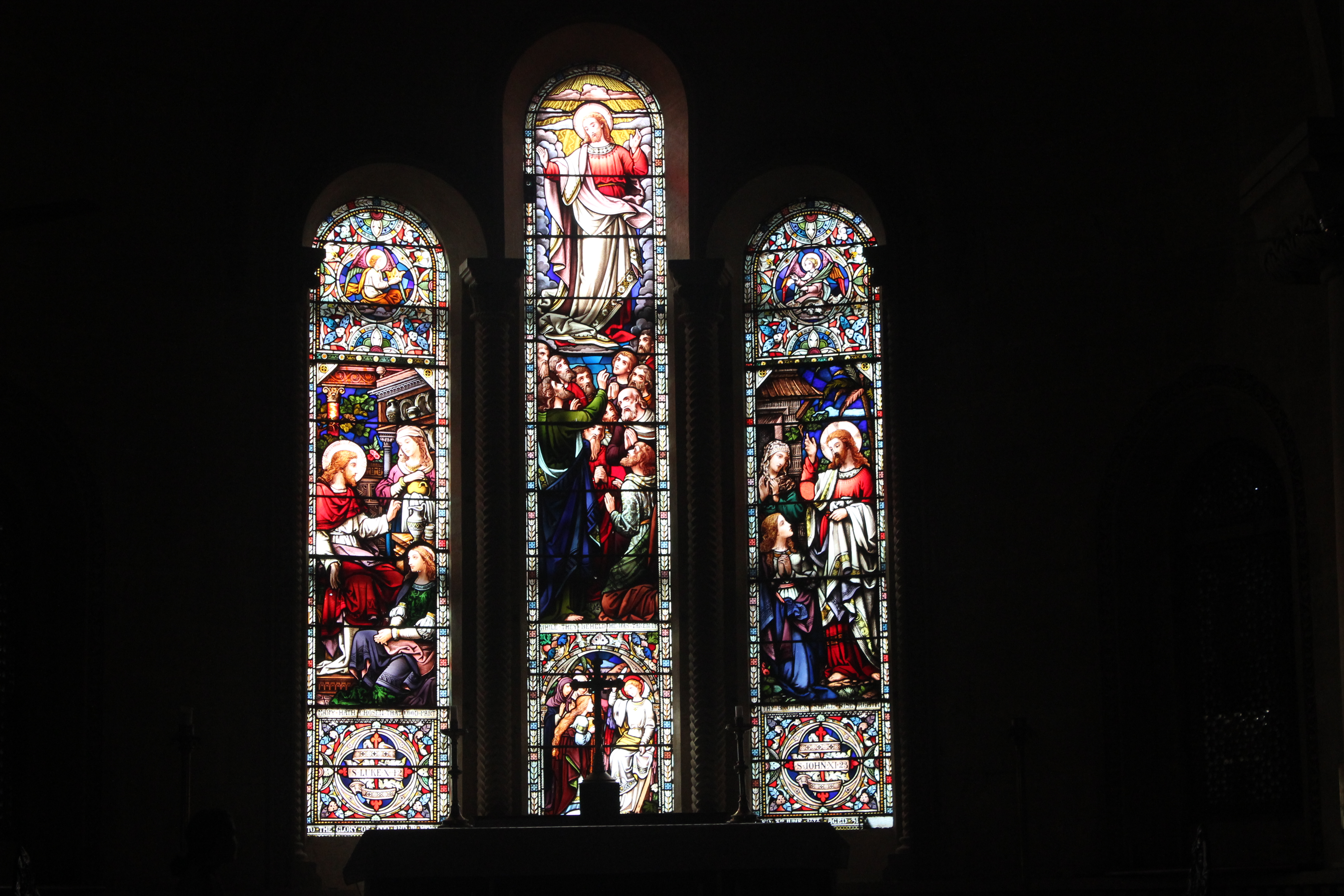
“Brightening the Faith” stain glass

Established in 1844 and built in 1855, the Holy Trinity Church located on Fatima Jinnah Road, Karachi, is one of the first major churches built in the area. Designed by the Captain of the Bombay Engineers, John Hill at a cost of 56,612 rupees. the church has a nave stretching 35 metres, followed by a tower standing at 45.7 metres tall. The church was built with buff colored Gizri stone and the architectural design made it unique. The church followed a Romanesque layout which made it stand out compared to the buildings located around. At the top of the tower, since there were no lighthouses, it was given beacons to act as a lighthouse to help guide ships into the Karachi Harbour. In 1904, Captain John Hill and Chief Engineer John Brunton, reviewed the cathedral and found that the foundation was showing signs of weakness due to wind vibrations from the sea windss and the British authorities removed the top two stories, giving the tower a new height of 35 metres.

During World War I, the church's tower was used as a signaling station. and soon in 1970 the pitched roof from the original design was replaced with barrel vaulted roof due to termite damage. Since the church is a former garrison church for the British military, it was designed to accommodate 800 worshipers and memorialize British servicemen who died in various campaigns for the British Raj and their history. Following the partition of India and creation of Pakistan, the church remained within the Church of India, Pakistan, Ceylon and Burma before the church was transferred over to the newly merged Church of Pakistan wherein it became a cathedral of the newly established Diocese of Karachi.

In 2004, the Cathedral was damaged by an Islamic terrorist attack where a car bomb was set off outside. The blast damaged one of the frames of a stained glass window. Whilst the window did not break, in order to retain it in place within the buckled frame, sticky tape was used to repair it.
