= Napier Road, Karachi =

Road in the city of Karachi, Sindh, Pakistan

Napier Road نپیر روڈ
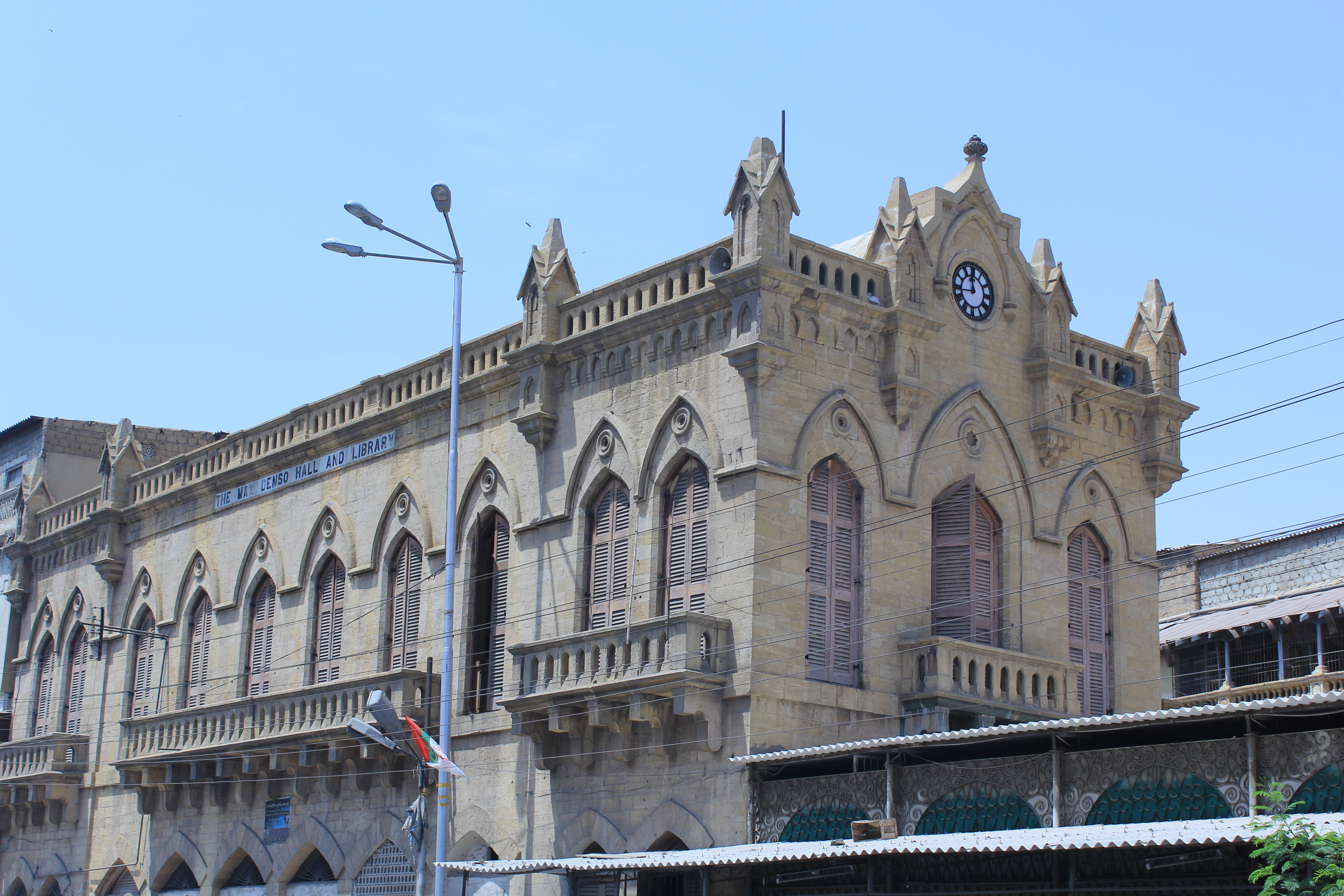
- Denso Hall, at the intersection of Napier Road, MA Jinnah Road, and Marriott Road
- Namesake: Charles James Napier, British general who conquered Sindh in 1843 and was its first Governor
- Length: 1.6 km (0.99 mi)
- Location: Karachi, Pakistan
- North end: northern end of Lea Market
- South end: McLeod Junction (intersection of Napier Road with I.I. Chundrigar Road)

Other
- Known for: being Karachi's red-light district

Napier Road (Urdu: نپیر روڈ) is a thoroughfare in Karachi, Pakistan, which is named after Charles Napier, the first British Governor of the Sindh province. It runs from I. I. Chundrigar Road to Chakiwara Road in the north. The road is famous for being the site of Karachi's principal red-light district.

== Route ==
Napier Road forms the eastern edge of Karachi's Old Town, made up of the neighborhoods of Mithadar and Jodia Bazaar, and separates it from the newer districts of Nanak Wara and Ranchore Lines, which were laid out in the colonial era and home to the city's old jail. It begins at the northern edge of Lea Market at the four-way intersection of Chakiwara Road, Pitchar Road, and Muhammad Ali Alvi Road. It courses 1.6 km south in a straight light, intersecting with MA Jinnah Road, before terminating at McLeod Junction on I. I. Chundrigar Road (formerly McLeod Road).

== Red-light district ==
The road is the principal red light district of Karachi. Because prostitution is illegal in Pakistan, the majority of Napier Road's brothels masquerade as dancing halls and theaters. The women refer to themselves as entertainers doing mujras (dance), and arrangements for sexual services are usually made through private pimps.

The sex trade was closed in 1999 under then Prime Minister Nawaz Sharif. Following campaigning and High Court cases, the Mohtasib-e-Aala (Federal Ombudsman) ruled the area could continue as before. The area reopened in March 2003. The red-light district has declined and only about 25 brothels remained as of 2015.

== See also ==
- List of streets in Karachi
- Prostitution in Pakistan
