= Nishtar =

Nishtar may refer to:

- Abdur Rab Nishtar (1899–1958), Pakistani politician
- Sania Nishtar (born 1963), Pakistani politician

== See also ==
- Nishtar Park, in Karachi, Sindh, Pakistan
- Nishtar Park bombing
