= Vaidya =

Sanskrit term and surname

Vaidya (Sanskrit: वैद्य), or vaid is a Sanskrit word meaning "doctor, physician". Today it is used to refer to traditional practitioners of Ayurveda, an indigenous Indian system of alternative medicine. Senior practitioners or teachers were called Vaidyarāja ("physician-king") as a mark of respect. Some practitioners who had complete knowledge of the texts and were excellent at their practices were known as Pranaacharya. Some royal families in India had a personal vaidya in attendance and these people were referred to as Rāja Vaidya ("the king's physician").

In Maharashtra, like many other last names, the last name "Vaidya" is linked to the profession that the family followed. Vaidyan or Vaidyar is a similar term used in Kerala to denote a physician. In Tamil Nadu, according to M. Srinivasa Aiyangar, the Vaidyas were an extinct section of the Vellalar caste. They were ministers under the Chola and Pandya kings and Sanskrit scholars well versed in the Vedas.

== Vaidya as a surname ==
As a last name in Maharashtra, Karnataka and Kerala, Vaidya Vaidyar or Vaidyan are usually found in several communities like the Brahmin, Chandraseniya Kayastha Prabhu, Billava, Mogaveera, Nairs, Ezhava as well as Sonar (goldsmith).

== Notables ==
- Lakshman Jagannath Vaidya
- Velutheri Kesavan Vaidyar
- Narayan Jagannath Vaidya
- Chintaman Vinayak Vaidya
- Bhai Vaidya
- Arun Shridhar Vaidya
- Jalabala Vaidya
- Omi Vaidya
- Kaajal Oza Vaidya
- Rahul Vaidya
- Prahalad Chunnilal Vaidya

== See also ==
- Vaid (surname)
