= Rasheed Turabi =

Pakistani religious scholar and philosopher (1908–1973)

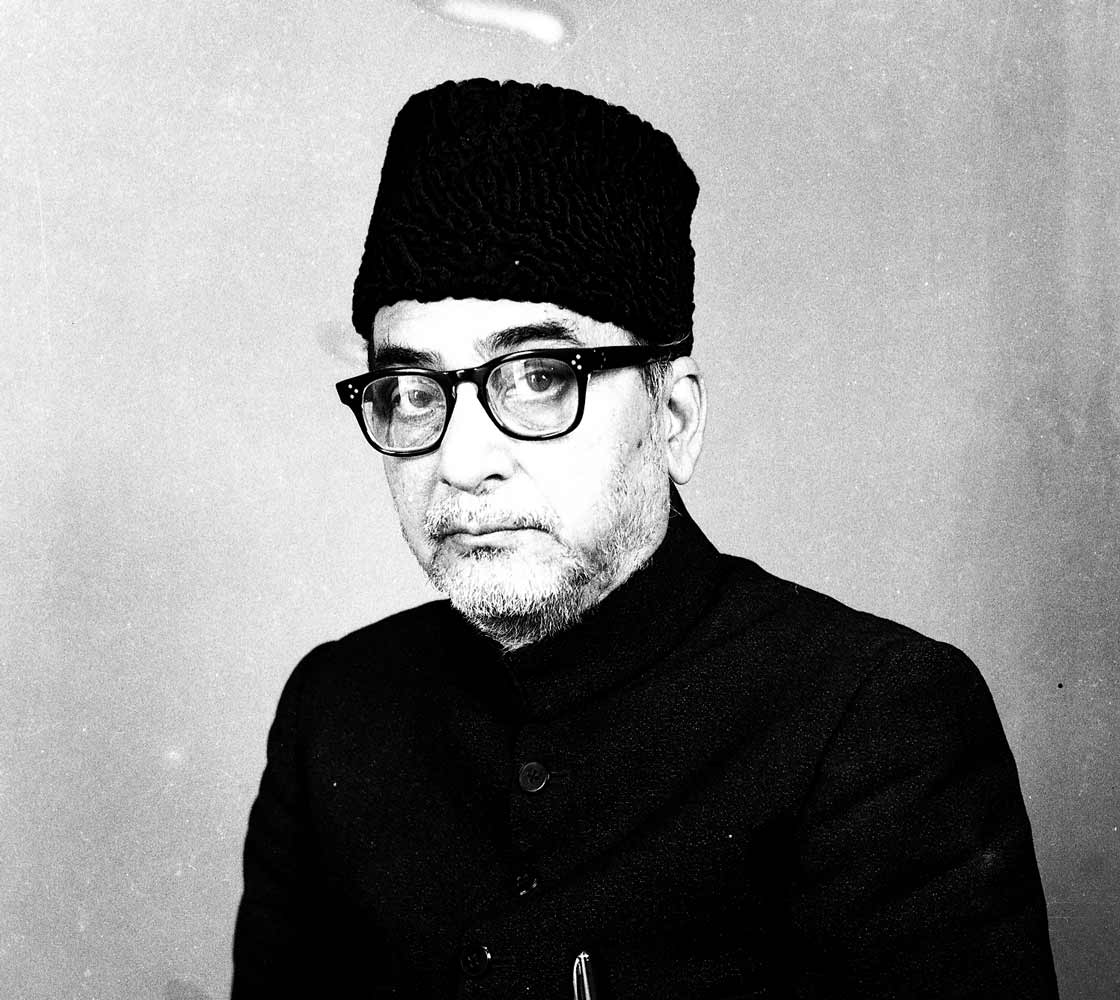
- Born: 9 July 1908; Hyderabad, Hyderabad Deccan
- Died: 18 December 1973 (aged 65); Karachi, Sindh, Pakistan
- Burial place: Hussainia Sajadia Imambargah, North Nazimabad, Karachi, Pakistan

Education
- Education: Osmania University; University of Allahabad

Philosophical work
- Region: Islamic scholar
- School: Twelver Shi'a
- Main interests: Exegesis of the Quran, Hadith, Riwayah and Narration, Ilm-ar-Rijal, Life & Teachings of Mohammed and Aale Mohammed, Narrating the Tragedy of Karbala and Working for Ittehad-e-Bainul Muslimeen
- Website: official website

Raza Hussain also known as Allama Rasheed Turabi (9 July 1908 – 18 December 1973) was an Islamic scholar, religious leader, public speaker, poet and philosopher.

== Early life and education ==
Turabi was born on (9th Jamadi-us-Sani 1326), 9 July 1908 in Hyderabad, Deccan. He was the eldest son of Maulvi Sharaf Hussain Khan, a nobleman from Hyderabad. He got his basic Islamic education from his father who taught him till the age of 5. He did matriculation from Hyderabad, and Intermediate-high school from Shia College, Lucknow. He was awarded a BA from Osmania University, Hyderabad State, British India and MA in Philosophy from University of Allahabad, India, while also being well versed in Arabic and Persian as well as studying under ayatollahs in Iran and Iraq.

== Career ==
Turabi delivered more than 5,000 religious lectures and speeches over 57 years. He was a student of Khalifa Abdul Hakim in philosophy and English and also studied with Hossein Borujerdi, Muhsin al-Hakim, and Abu al-Qasim al-Khoei.

Turabi started his political career as a lieutenant of Nawab Bahadur Yar Jang. He was a religious orator under the last Nizam of Hyderabad, Mir Osman Ali Khan. Later, he became the chief of the Hyderabad State chapter of the All India Muslim League. Quaid-e-Azam Muhammad Ali Jinnah nominated him as the information secretary of Hyderabad State's All India Muslim League.

=== Migration to Pakistan ===
He migrated to Pakistan in 1949 upon the request of Quaid-e-Azam Muhammad Ali Jinnah and started addressing Shia majalis at the Imambargahs in Kharadar, Khaliq Dina Hall and Martin Road Pakistan Quarters in Karachi. He also addressed Eid Milad-un-Nabi Mawlid gatherings at Aram Bagh and Jahangir Park. This went a long way in establishing his popularity among both Sunnis and Shias alike. Later, he started addressing majalis (gatherings) at Nishtar Park and at Imambargah Hussainian Iranian in Kharadar.

His first Shaam-e-Ghareban Majlis was broadcast on the Radio Pakistan in 1951. It became an annual feature till his death. The last Majlis he addressed was at Khaliq Dina Hall where he had a heart attack in 1971. He continued to address 'Majalis-i-Sham-i-Ghareban' at Nishtar Park until 1973.

== Death and legacy ==
Allama Rasheed Turabi died on 18 December 1973 in Karachi and was buried in Hussainia Sajadia Imambargah in North Nazimabad, Karachi. His 13 children include Islamic scholar Allamah Aqeel Turabi, Allamah Dr. Salman Turabi and poet Naseer Turabi

== Books ==
=== 1936 — تہنیتِ‌جوبلی ===
Tahniyat-e-Jubli ("Jubilee Felicitations") A celebratory collection of Turabi’s poetry and prose, written on the occasion of a jubilee anniversary, showcasing his early literary and stylistic development.

=== 1938 — مقدّس قانون ===
Muqaddas Qanoon ("The Sacred Law") A reflective work on Islamic jurisprudence and moral principles, presenting Turabi’s early religious philosophy and social critique.

=== 1970 — طبِ معصومین علیہم السلام ===
Tibb-e-Masumeen (A.S.) ("Medicine of the Infallibles") A thematic collection of lectures on prophetic medicine, spiritual health, and ethical guidance from the lives of the Ahl al-Bayt.

=== 1989 — مجالسِ ترابی ===
Majalis-e-Turabi ("Turabi’s Gatherings") A posthumously published compilation of Turabi’s majalis (religious sermons), covering Qur'anic themes, Imamate, and Islamic ethics. Widely circulated among Shia communities.
