= Denso Hall =

Library in Karachi, Pakistan

- ڈینسو ہال
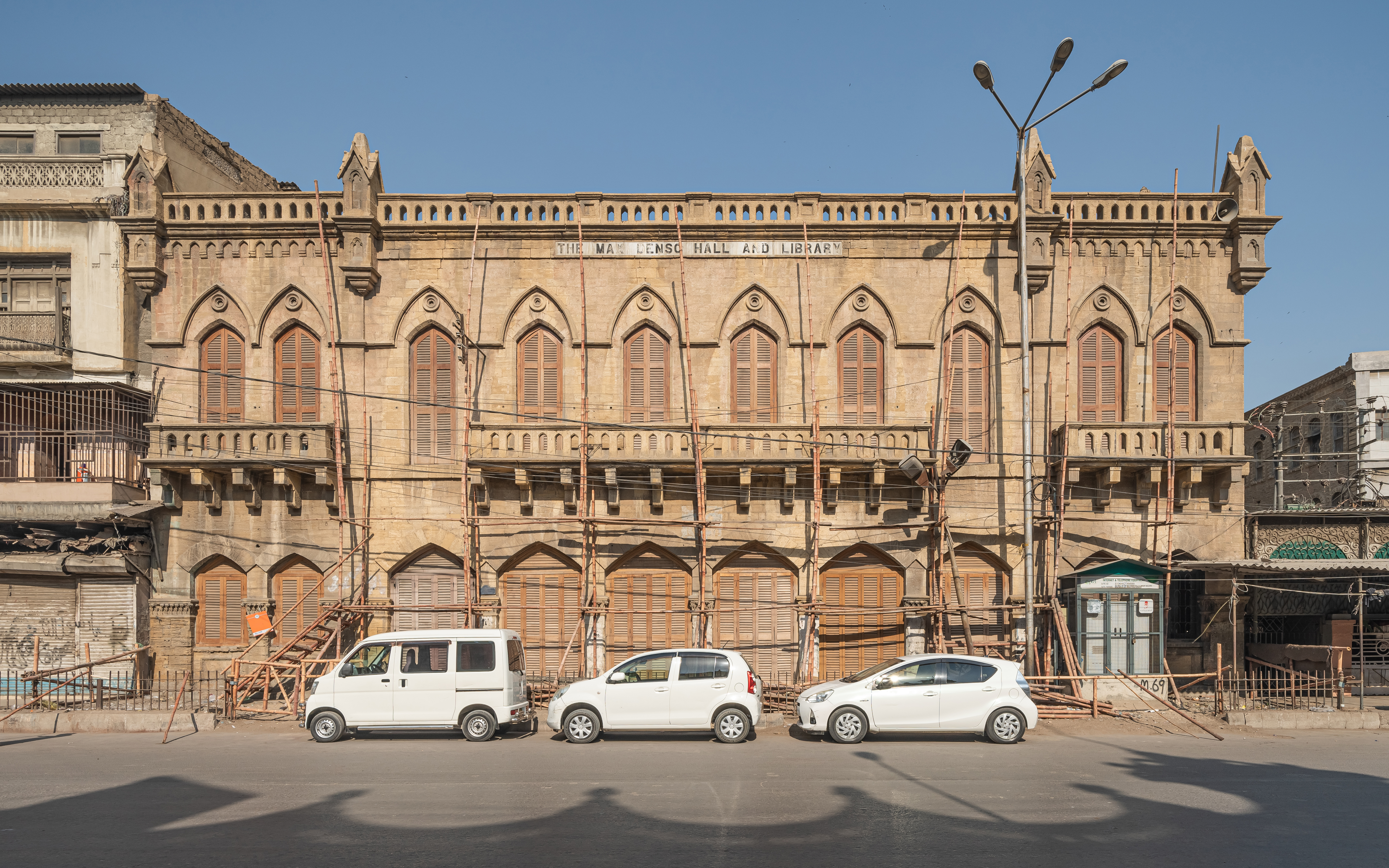
- Max Denso Hall and Library
- Etymology: Max Denso

General information
- Type: library
- Architectural style: Venetian gothic revival
- Location: Muhammad Ali Jinnah Road, Karachi, Karachi, Pakistan
- Coordinates: 24.8530°N 67.0041°E
- Completed: 1886
- Opened: 1886

Design and construction
- Architect: James Strachan

Denso Hall (Urdu: ڈینسو ہال), officially The Max Denso Hall and Library, is a library in Karachi, Pakistan. Built in 1886, it is the first library in Karachi to serve the native population.

== Location ==
Denso Hall and Library is located at a triangular corner formed by Mohammad Ali Jinnah Road, Murad Khan Road, and Marriott Road in the borough of Saddar Town, in central Karachi.

== History ==
The British colonial government built libraries in Karachi, such as at Frere Hall, but they were restricted to British colonial officers and their families. Denso Hall was constructed in 1886 as the first library for the natives of Karachi. It was named for Max Denso, who chaired the Karachi Chamber of Commerce in the 1870s.

== Architecture ==
James Strachan was the architect of the project and the building was completed in 1886. The architectural design is Venetian gothic, with Tudor elements on the top floor. Local Gizri sandstone was used in the construction. When the building was completed it had one library and one reading-room on the ground floor, and the main hall on the first floor. The main road facing side has balconies with sculpted balusters. The clock on the top was a gift from Rao Sahib Ramdas Morarji, a local Parsi philanthropist who also donated 1,800 books to the library. The local Khoja community donated another 1,200.

== Conservation ==
In 2010, it was announced that the Heritage Foundation Pakistan, with financial support from Karachi Electric Supply Corporation, would restore Denso Hall as a Heritage site. In 2019, the hall's facade, along with other heritage structures on Marriott Road, were cleaned.

== See also ==
- Heritage Foundation Pakistan
- Khaliq Deena Hall
