= Shri Swaminarayan Mandir, Karachi =

Hindu temple in Karachi, Pakistan

Shri Swami Narayan Mandir سوامی نارائن مندر
- Śrī Svāmī Nārāyaṇ Mandir
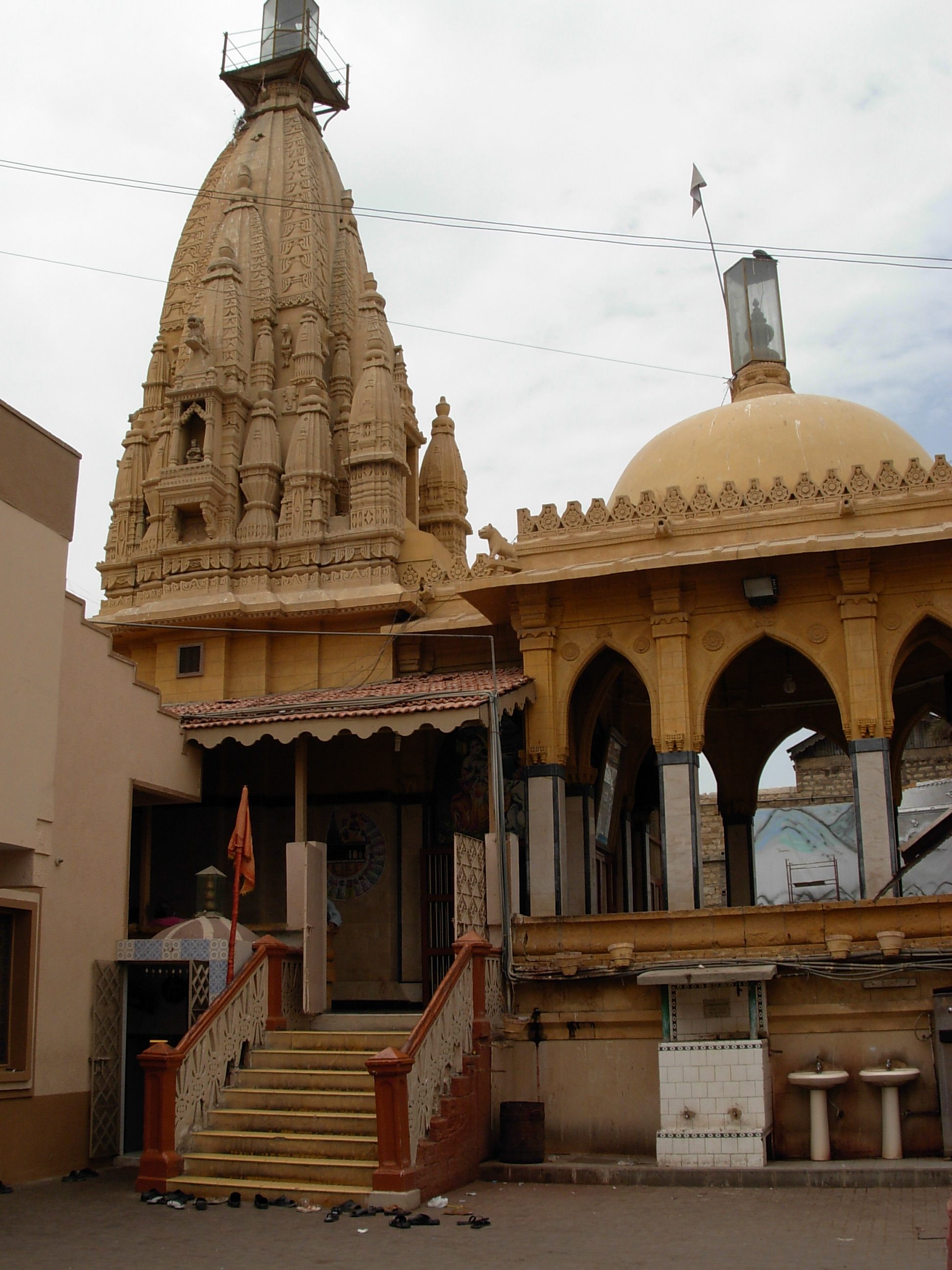
- Swami Narayan Mandir

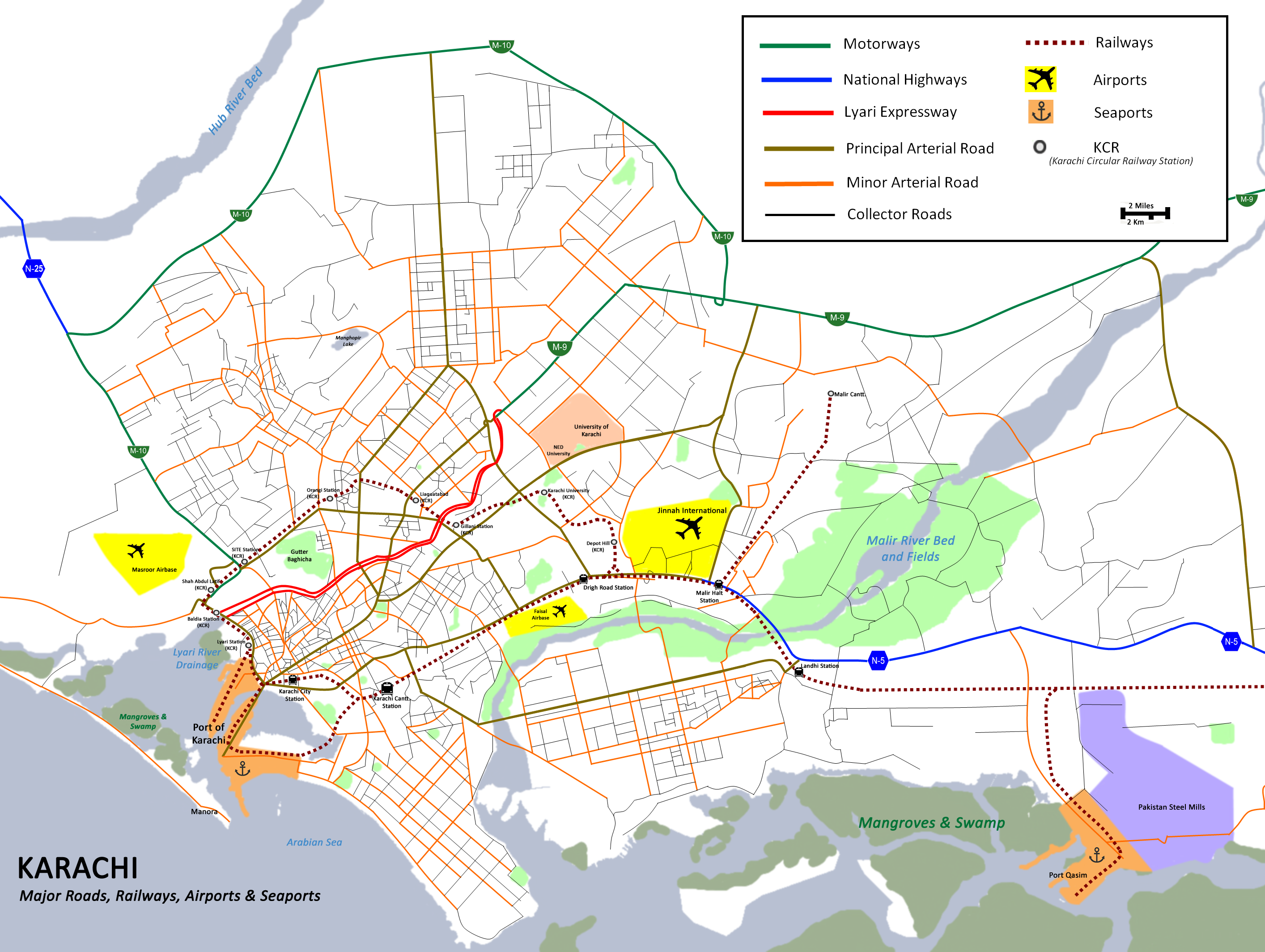
- Location within Karachi

Religion
- Affiliation: Hinduism
- District: Karachi
- Deity: Nara Narayana and Swaminarayan

Location
- Location: M. A. Jinnah Road, Karachi
- State: Sindh
- Country: Pakistan
- Coordinates: 24°51′15.7″N 67°00′28.7″E

Architecture
- Type: Hindu temple architecture
- Completed: 1788

The Shri Swami Narayan Mandir, Karachi (Urdu: شری سوامی نارائن مندر) is a Hindu temple that is the only surviving Swami Narayan temple in Pakistan. The temple is notable for its size and frontage, over 27,012 square metres (32,306 sq yd) on the M. A. Jinnah Road in Karachi city. The temple celebrated its anniversary of 216 years in April 2004. There is a sacred cowshed within the premises of this temple. The temple is located at the centre of a Hindu neighbourhood in Karachi. The building that housed a dharmshala (guest house) for visiting devotees has now been converted to the office of the City District Government.

== History ==
The Swaminarayan Sampradaya spread in the Sindh region in the late 19th century. In 1890s, a temple dedicated to Swami Narayan was built by Gujarati merchants.

=== Independence of Pakistan and India and after ===
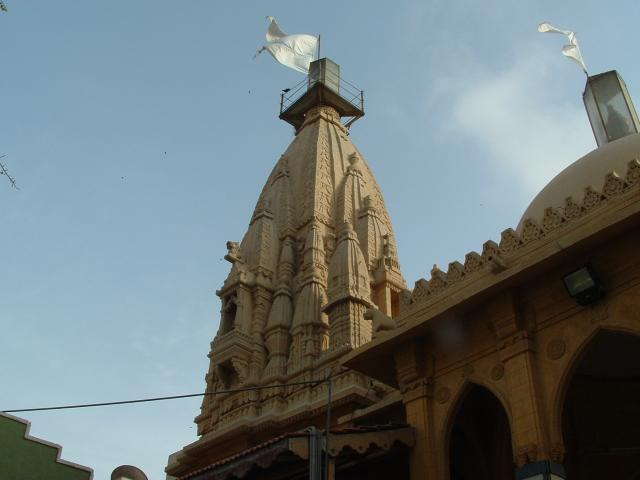
The Shikhar of the Swaminarayan Temple in Karachi

The temple became a refugee camp in 1947. The original images of Swaminarayan were removed and taken to India during the turbulent times of independence. One murti that was originally at this temple is now located in Khan Village, Rajasthan. People who wished to settle in India from all over Sindh awaited their departure to India by ship at this temple. The temple was visited by Muhammad Ali Jinnah, the founder of Pakistan during this period. In 1989, for the first time since the independence in 1947, a group of sadhus from the Shri Swaminarayan Mandir, Ahmedabad visited the temple. Since then, small groups from the Ahmedabad temple pay this temple a visit every few years in a pilgrimage.

== Festivals and events ==
According to the Pakistan Hindu Council, Swaminarayan Jayanti, Ram Navami, Janmastami, Dussehra, Diwali and almost all of the main religious festivals are celebrated by Hindus in this temple. Holi is celebrated with the holi bonfire lit at the centre of the temple grounds, followed by the play with colours. Janmashtami is celebrated with singing bhajans and sermons on Krishna, while on Diwali, devotees light lamps and candles to welcome Rama from his fourteen-year exile, at the end of which he defeated Ravana and young men burst crackers at the temple on the occasion. The Holi festival celebrations that take place at this temple are the biggest in Karachi.

The temple also doubles as a marriage venue. In 2008, a mass wedding arrangement was made for 20 poor couples.

== Hinglaj yatra ==
The Hinglaj yatra starts from the Swaminarayan Temple complex here annually.

== Gurdwara ==
In the Swaminarayan Mandir complex in Karachi, Sindh, a Gurdwara has been created for the small Sikh community.

The Gurdwara Sahib houses three sets of Sri Guru Granth Sahib Ji in the Palki Sahib. There are pictures of the Gurus and a small shrine devoted to Guru Nanak Dev Ji. There is a Hindu bell in the Gurdwara Sahib as well.

The whole compound is protected by a security guard to protect the small number of Hindu families.

== Gallery ==
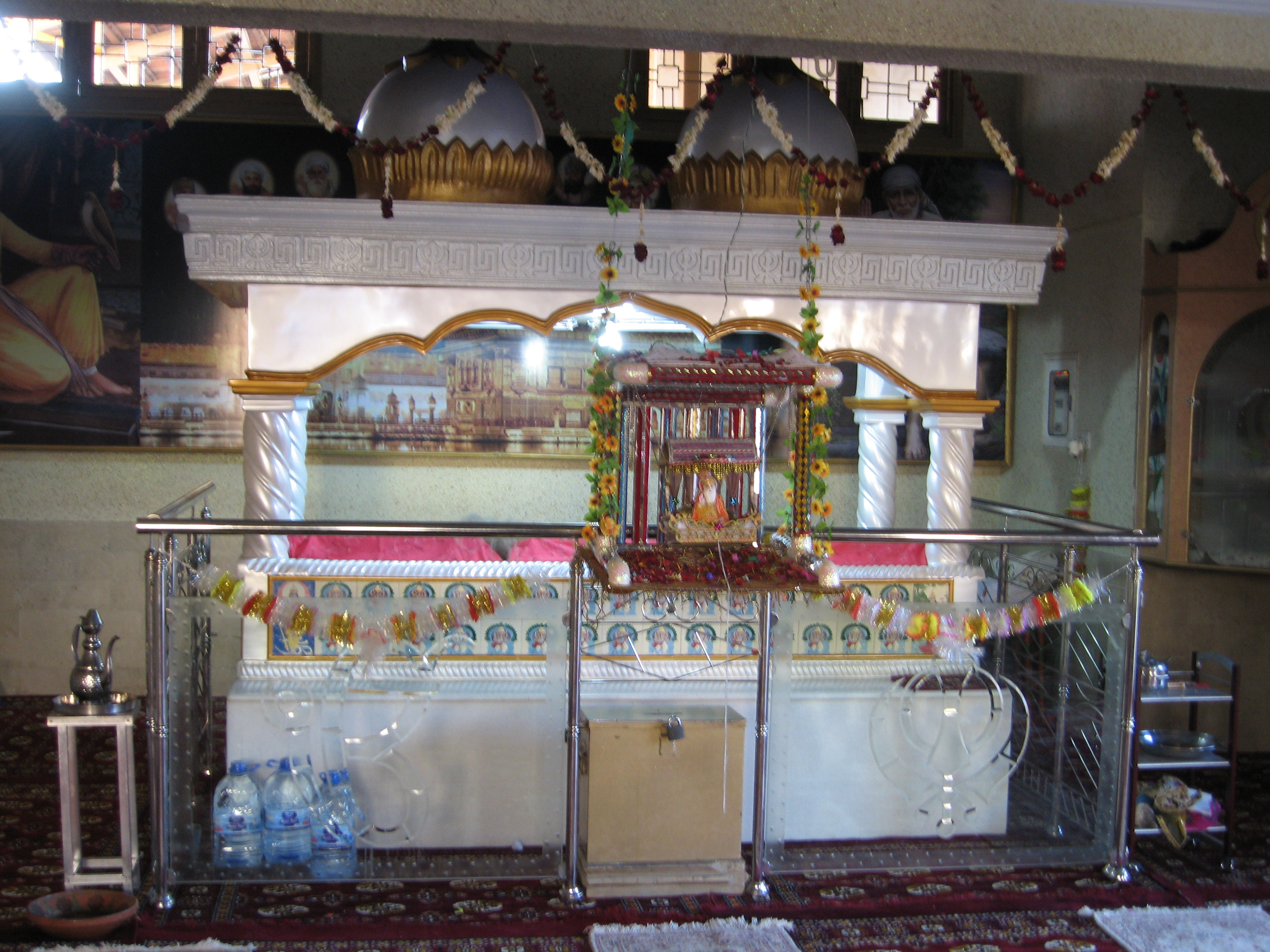
Interior of Gurdwara in Swami Narain Mandir Complex, Karachi

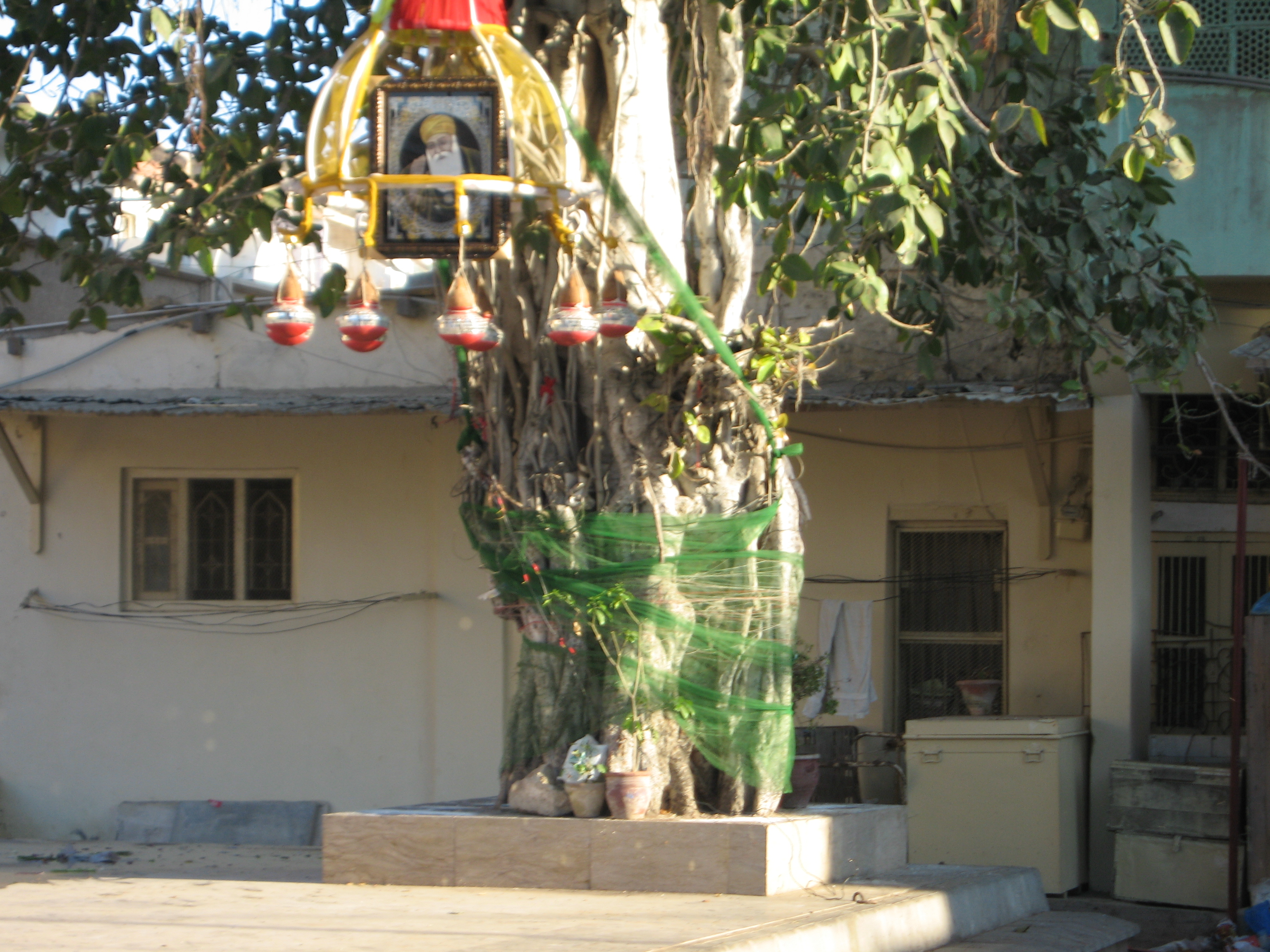
Exterior of Gurdwara in Swami Narain Mandir Complex, Karachi

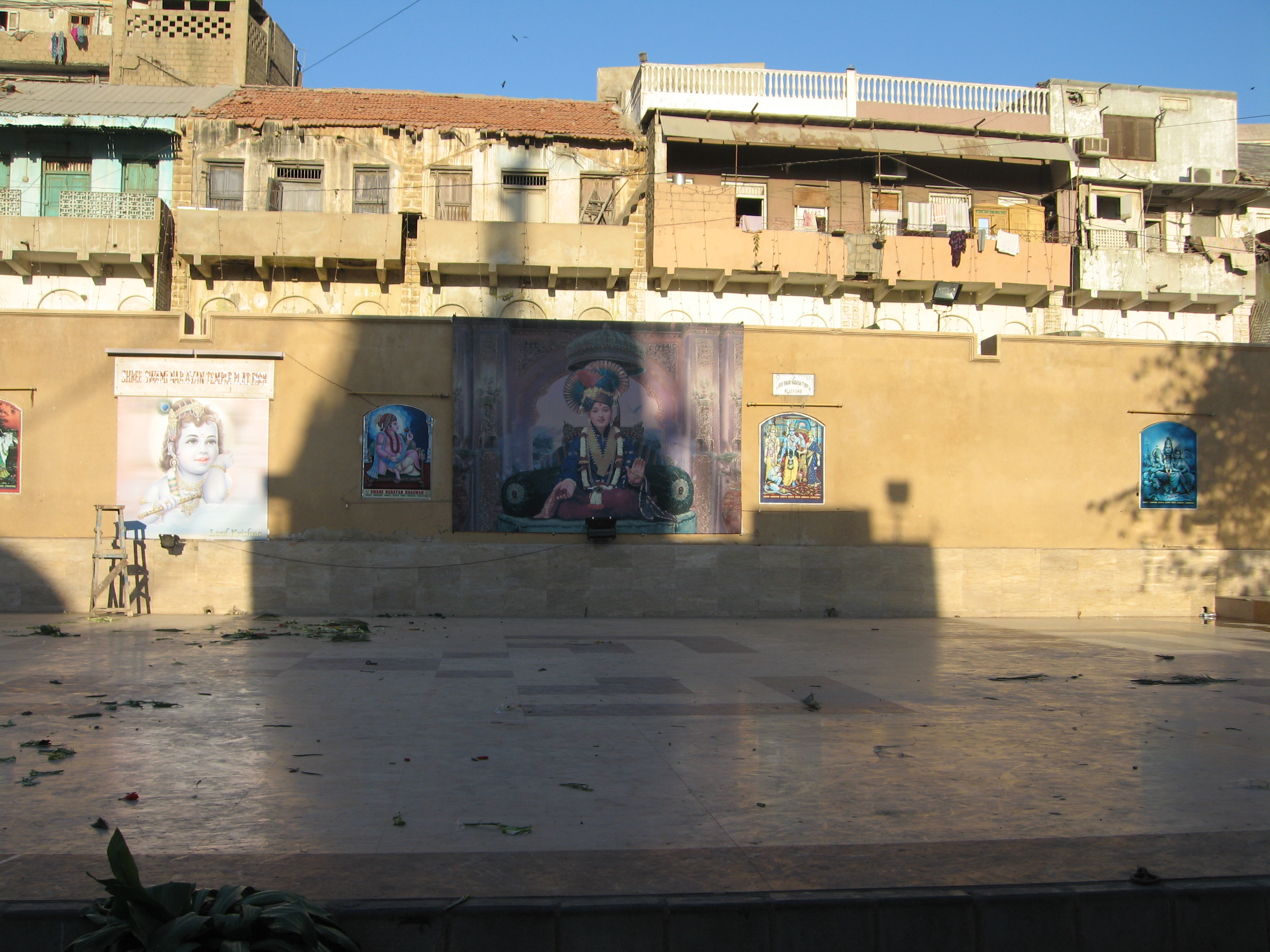
Exterior of Gurdwara in Swami Narain Mandir Complex, Karachi

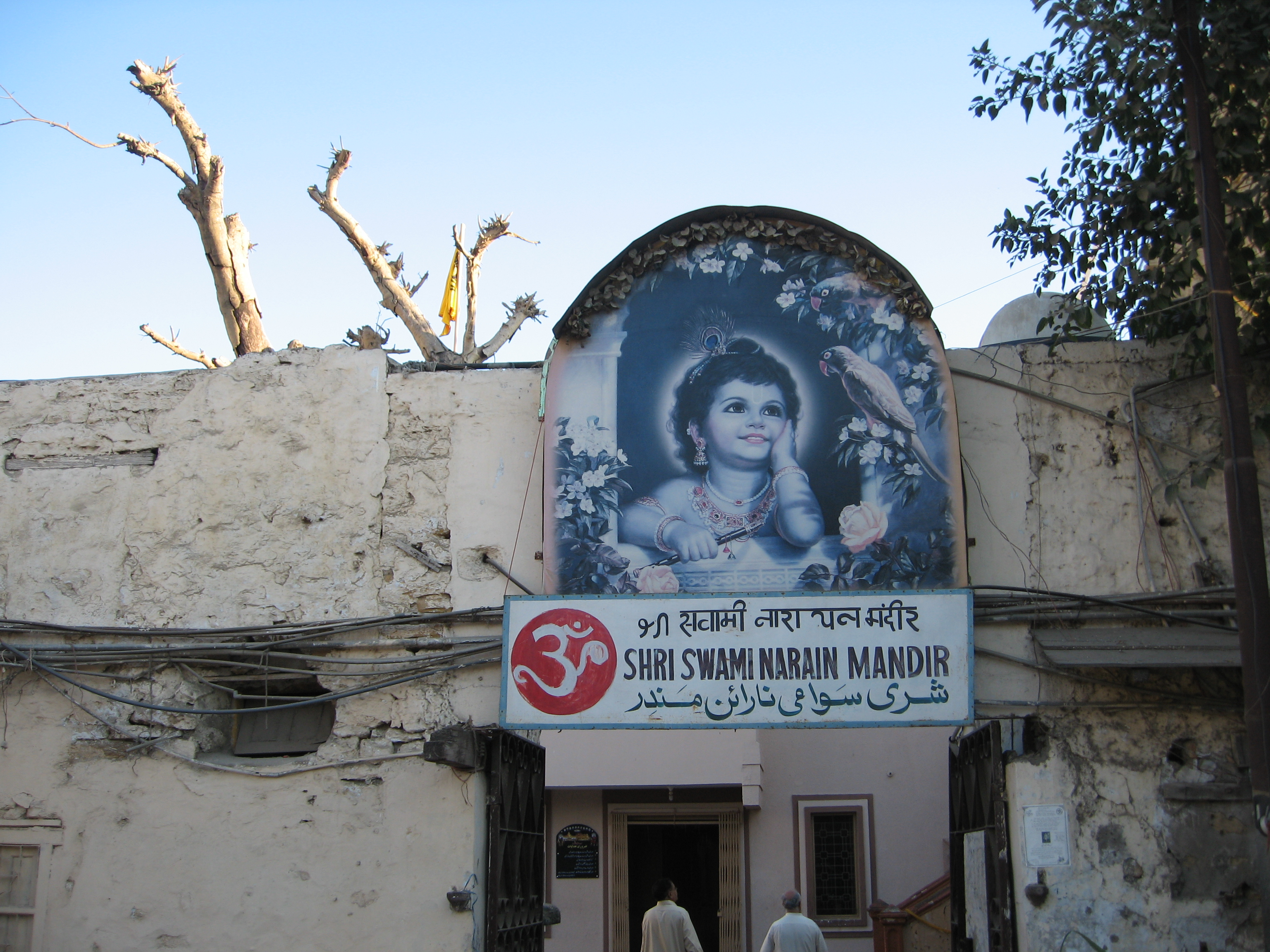
Exterior of Gurdwara in Swami Narain Mandir Complex, Karachi

== See also ==
- Hinduism in Pakistan
- Swaminarayan
- Swaminarayan Sampraday
- Shri Varun Dev Mandir
- Evacuee Trust Property Board
- Pakistan Hindu Council
- Hinglaj Mata
- Kalat Kali Temple
- Katasraj temple
- Multan Sun Temple
- Prahladpuri Temple, Multan
- Sadh Belo
- Shiv Mandir, Umerkot
- Tilla Jogian
