= List of streets in Karachi =

This is a list of streets in Karachi, Pakistan.

== List ==
Roads and streets in Karachi
Street	From / towards	Lane(s)	Description
Abdullah Haroon Road	Saddar	2	Named for Abdullah Haroon
I. I. Chundrigar Road	Shaheen Complex to Merewether Tower	2	Named for Ibrahim Ismail Chundrigar
M. A. Jinnah Road (Bunder Road)	Gurumandir to Merewether Tower	3	Named for Muhammad Ali Jinnah arterial road connecting to Karachi's main seaport
Napier Road	I. I. Chundrigar Road to Lea Market	2	Named for Charles Napier
Zaibunnisa Street	Hotel Metropole to Mohammad Ali Jinnah Road	2	Named for Zaib-un-Nissa Hamidullah
Shahrah-e-Faisal	Hotel Metropole to Jinnah International Airport	4	Named after King Faisal of Saudi Arabia
Rashid Minhas Road	Drigh Road to Nagan Chowrangi	4	Named after Rashid Minhas Shaheed
New Muhammad Ali Jinnah Road	Shaheed-e-Millat Expressway to Mansfield Street	2	Named after Muhammad Ali Jinnah
Nishtar Road	Jehangir Road to Chakiwara Road	2	Named after Abdur Rab Nishtar
Eduljee Dinshaw Road	Karachi Port Trust Building to the Customs House	2	Named after Seth Edulji Dinshaw

== See also ==
- Transport in Karachi
- List of historic roads
