= Jinnah Bridge =

Jinnah Bridge جناح پل
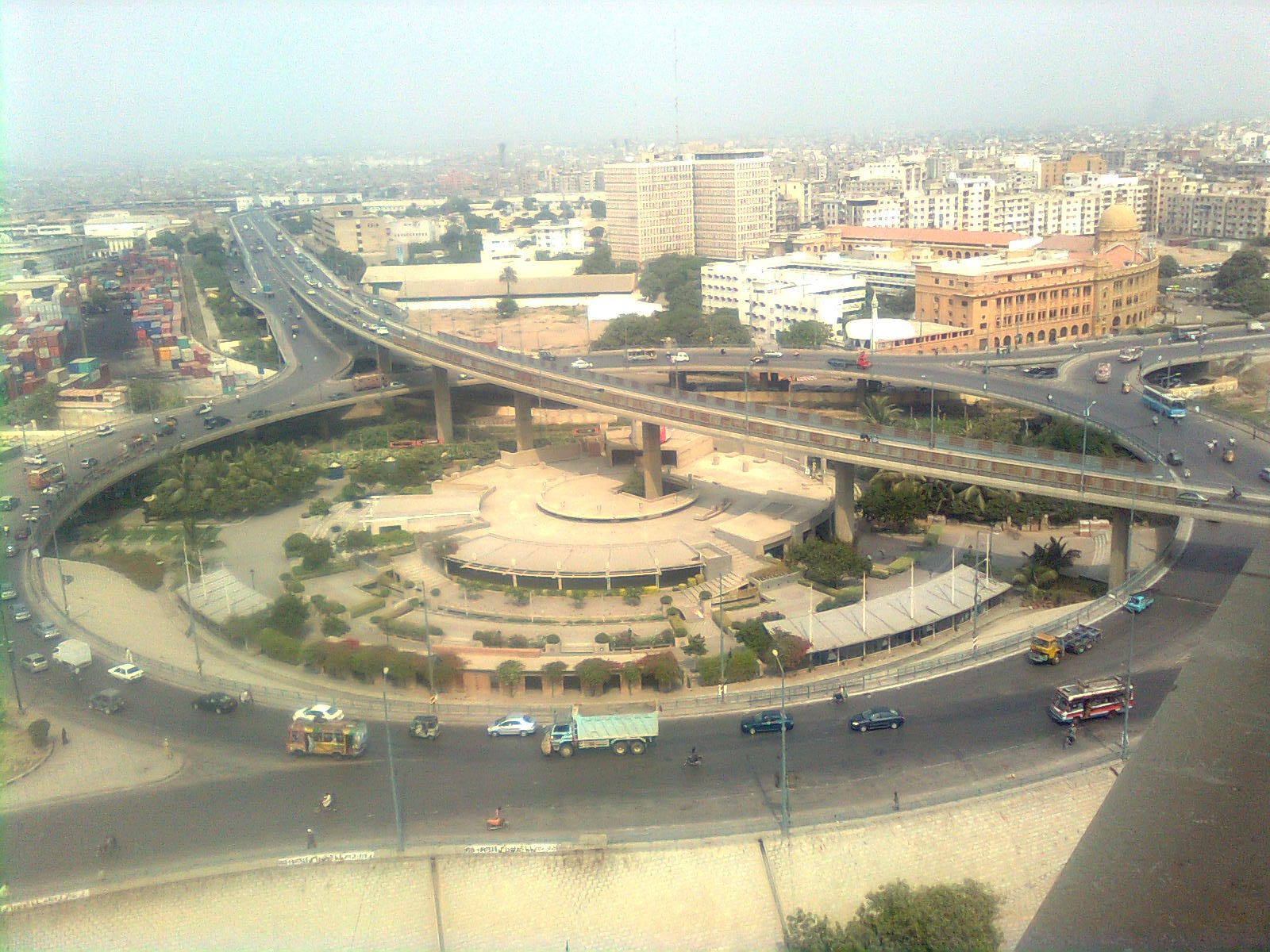
- The Jinnah Bridge, with the Karachi Port Trust Building in the background
- Coordinates: 24°50′34″N 66°59′25″E
- Carries: vehicular traffic
- Locale: Karachi, Pakistan
- Named for: Muhammad Ali Jinnah

Characteristics
- Trough construction: reinforced concrete
- Total length: 1,262.7 metres
- No. of lanes: 2

History
- Construction start: 1993
- Opened: 1997

Location
- Interactive map of Jinnah Bridge جناح پل

Jinnah Bridge (Urdu: جناح پل) is a circular flyover located between Kharadar and Kiamari on Chinna Creek in Karachi, Pakistan. Until 1982, the bridge was known as Napier Mole Bridge. It was upgraded and developed into a circular one-way flyover between 1993 and 1997. The bridge connects Karachi port to the city, and is the southwest terminus of Mohammad Ali Jinnah Road. Port Grand Food and Entertainment Complex food street is located in the centre of the flyover.
