= Nanak Wara =

Nanak Wara نانک واڑہ
- Neighbourhood
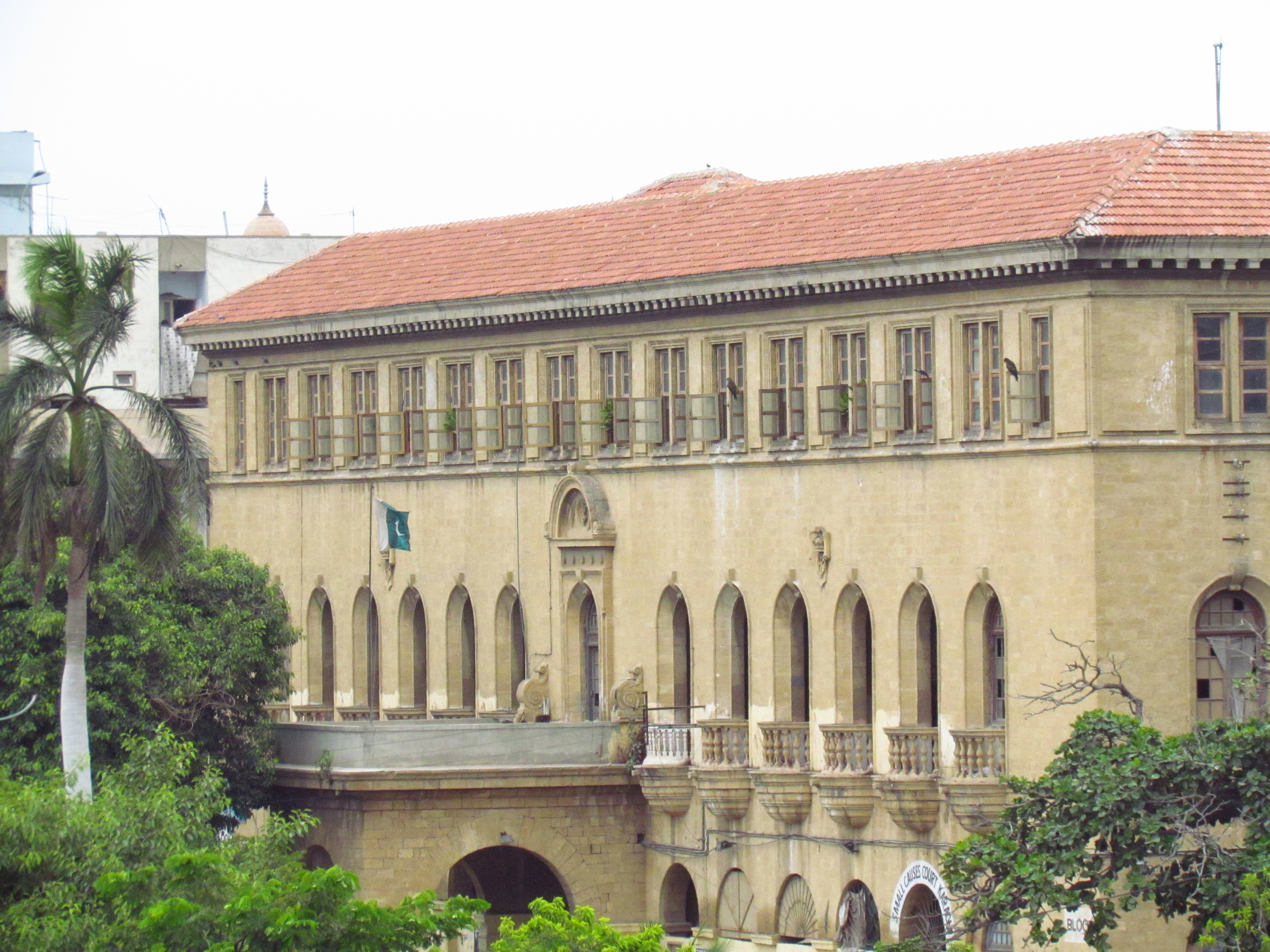
- Nanak Wara is the location of Karachi's City Courts
- Country: Pakistan
- Province: Sindh
- City: Karachi

Government
  - Constituency: NA-247 (Karachi South-II)
  - National Assembly Member: Aftab Siddiqui (PTI)

Nanak Wara (Urdu: نانک واڑہ), originally laid out as the Jail Quarter, is a neighbourhood in central Karachi, Pakistan. The neighbourhood is part of the wider Saddar Town borough, and is located north of M.A. Jinnah Road. It is situated between Jodia Bazaar and Mithadar on the east, and Gazdarabad on the west. To the south is the Serai Quarter and Aram Bagh.

== Gallery ==
The following are heritage buildings in Nanak Wara which are protected by the Government of Sindh:

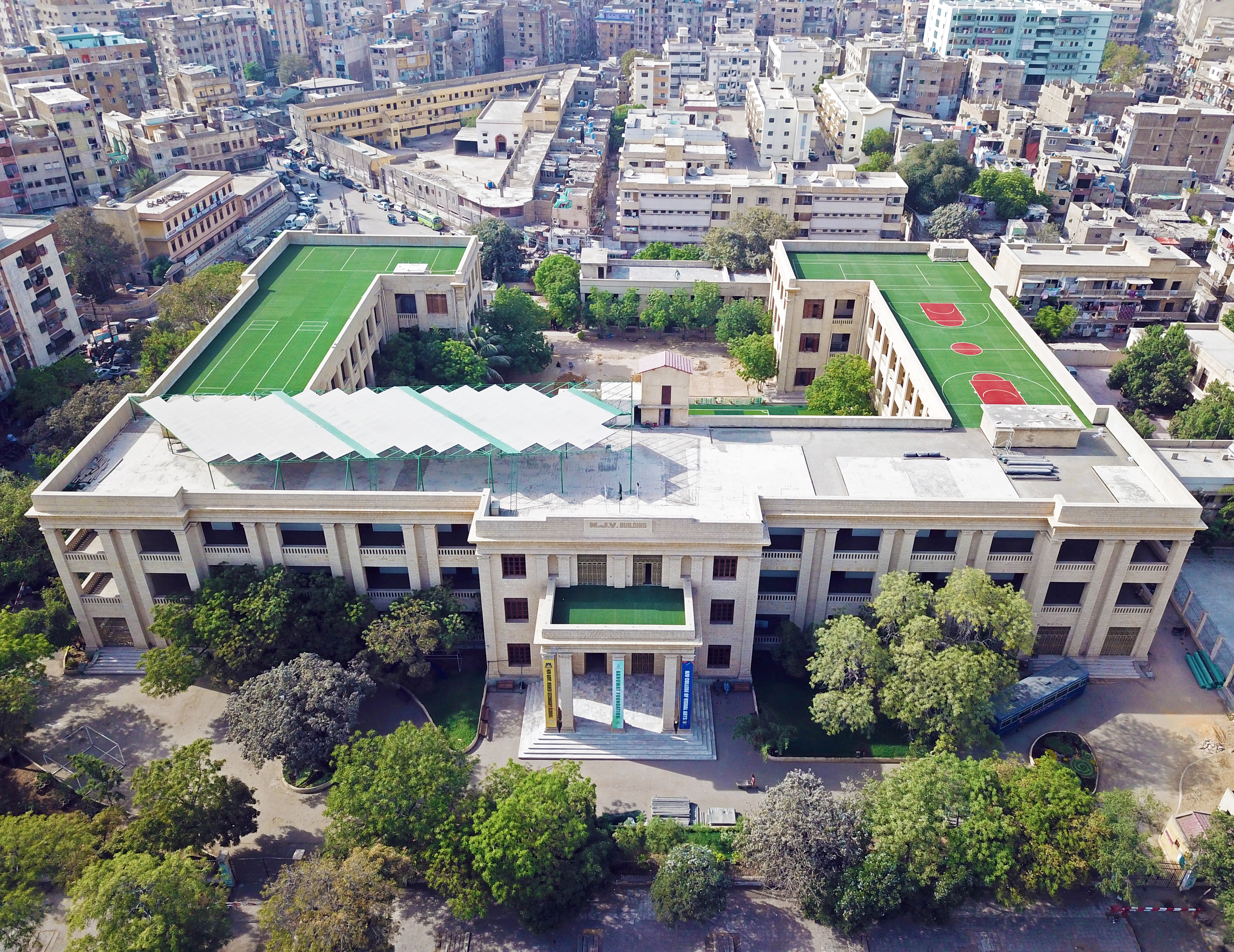
NJV Government Higher Secondary School

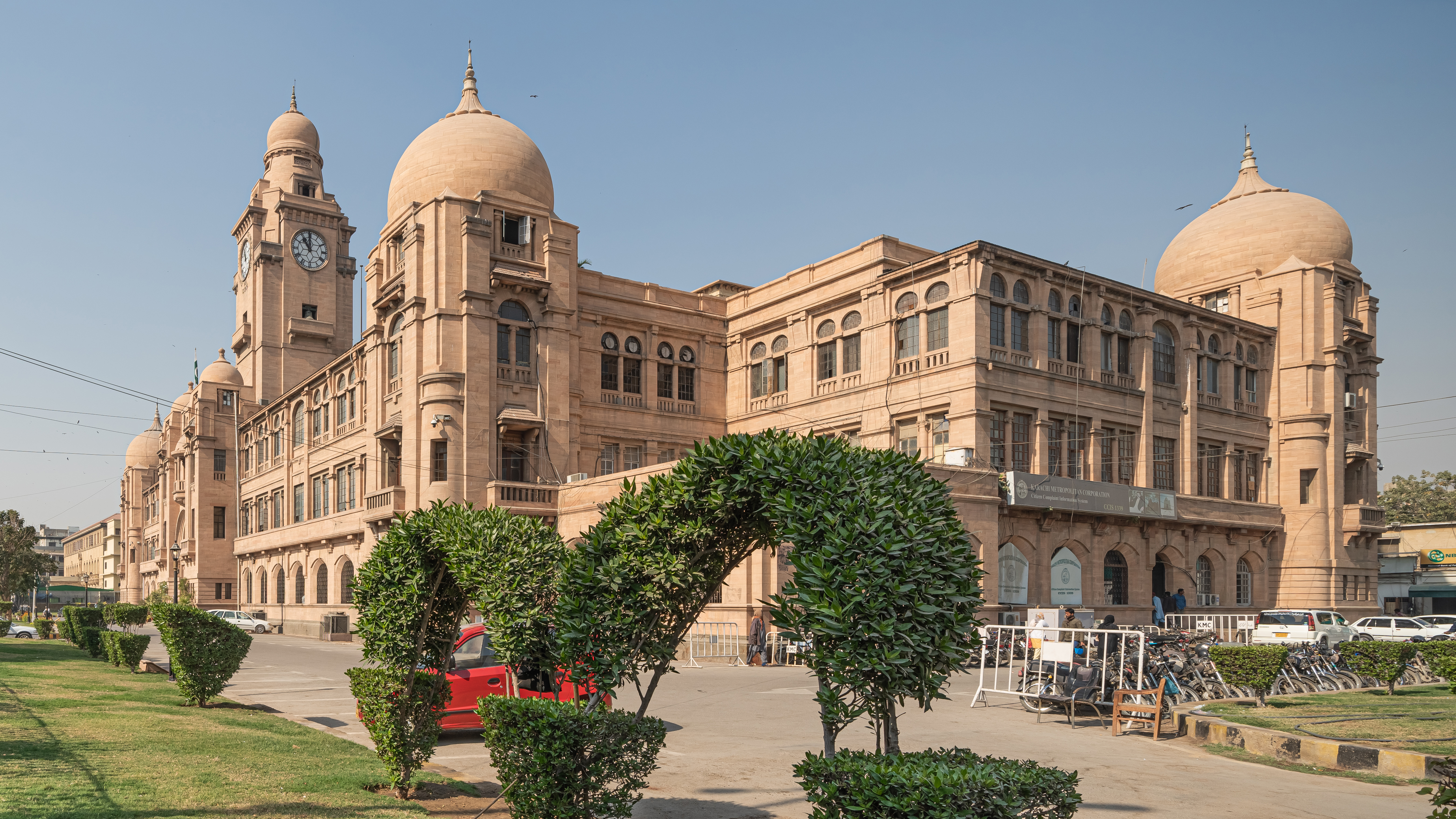
Karachi Metropolitan Corporation Building

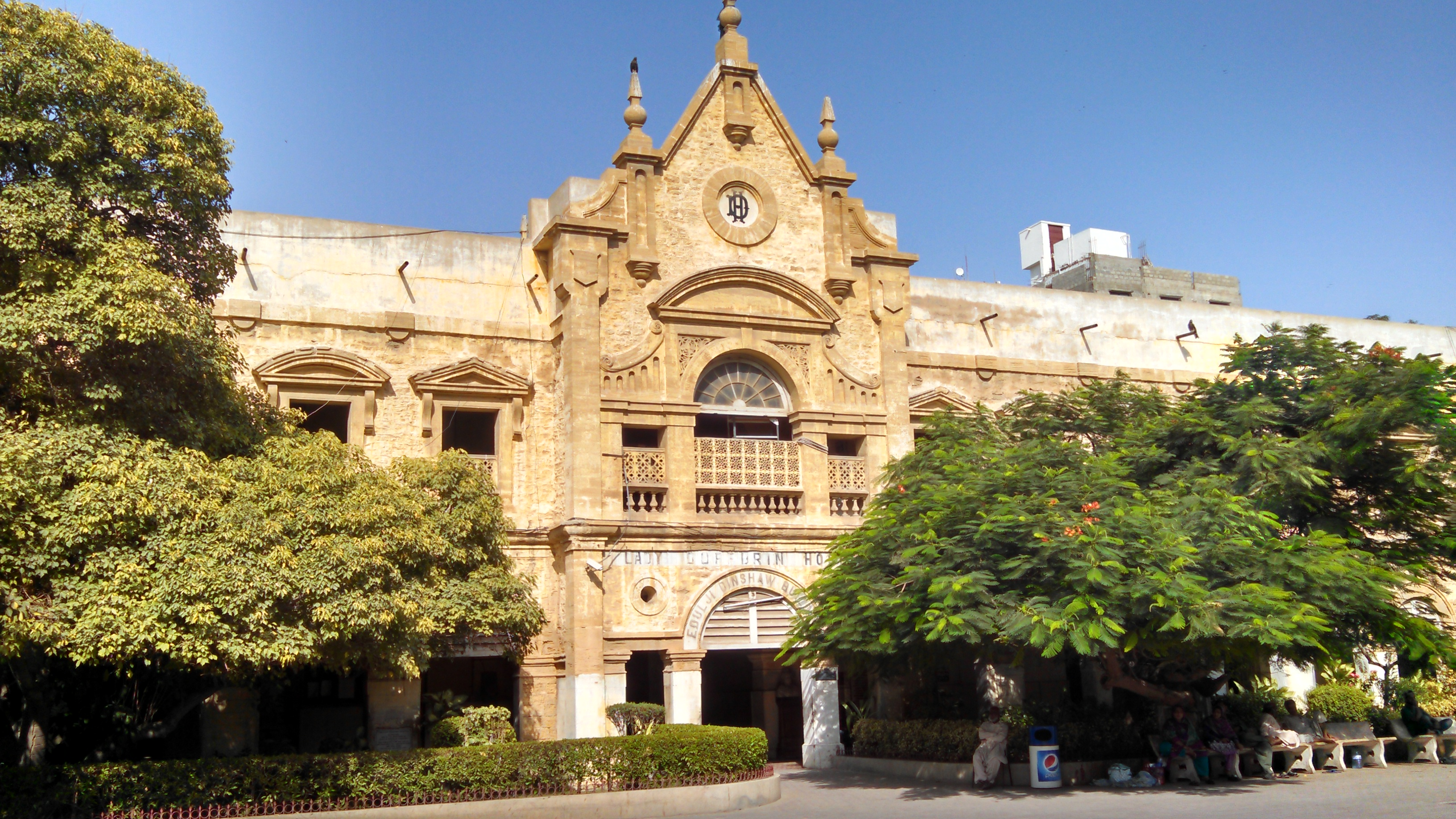
Lady Dufferin Hospital
