= Richmond Crawford Veterinary Hospital =

Veterinary hospital in Karachi, Pakistan

Geography
- Location: M.A. Jinnah Road, Karachi, Pakistan
- Coordinates: 24°51′40″N 67°01′08″E

Organisation
- Type: Veterinary hospital

History
- Founded: 1892

Links
- Lists: Hospitals in Pakistan

The Richmond Crawford Veterinary Hospital (RCVH) is a veterinary hospital located on M.A. Jinnah Road near the Radio Pakistan Karachi building. It is one of the oldest veterinary hospitals in Pakistan.

== History ==
It was founded by Richmond Crawford, a commissioner of Sind who was interested in animal welfare. According to one account, the hospital was established in 1892 when he secured two acres of land. In recognition of his contributions, the community named the establishment in his honor.

For years, it functioned as a government-run infirmary.
