= Muhammad Ali Jinnah Road =

Major road in Karachi, Pakistan

Muhammad Ali Jinnah Road شاہراہ محمد على جناح
- MA Jinnah Road
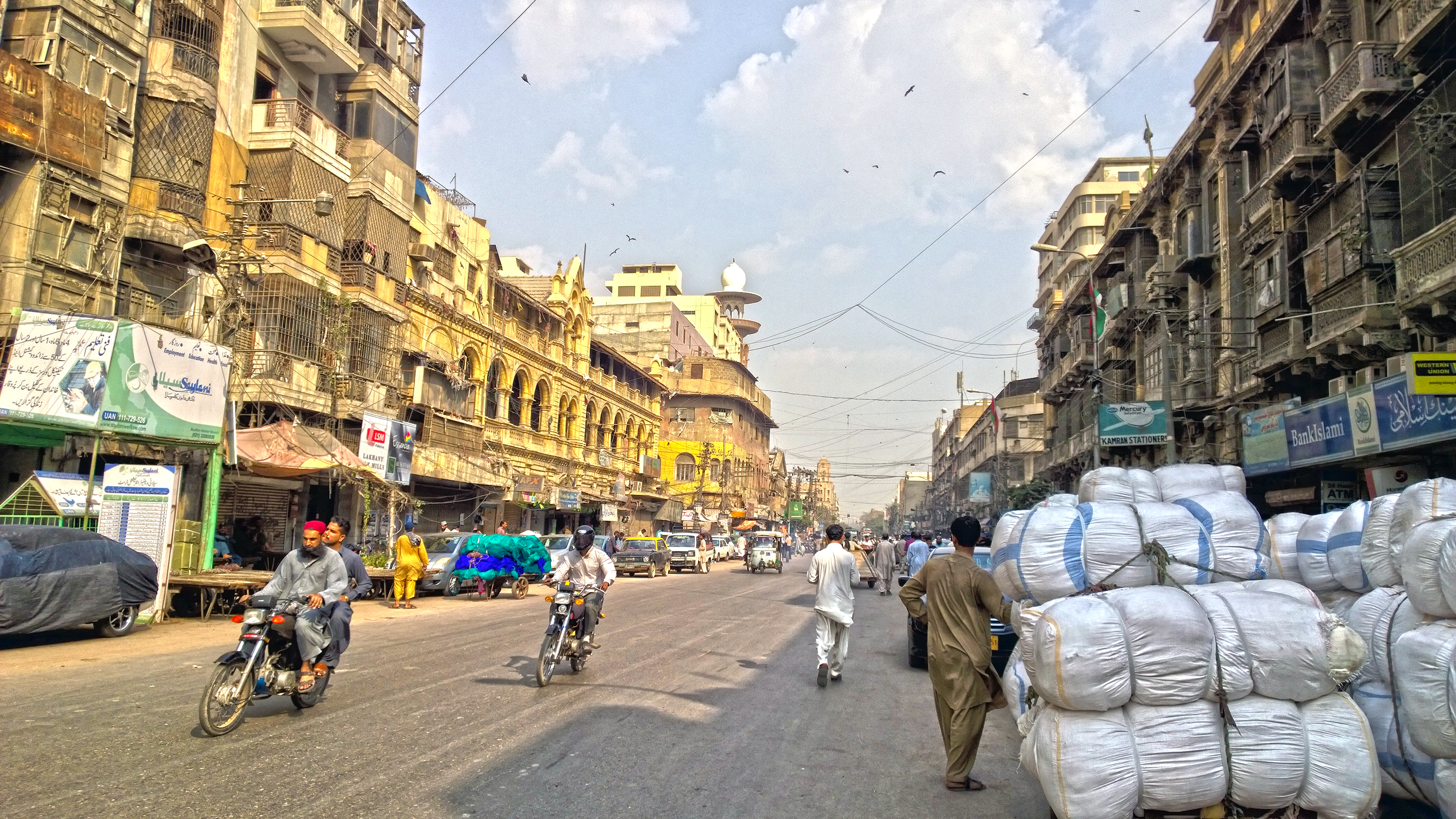
- Muhammad Ali Jinnah Road passes through part of Karachi's colonial core
- Former name: Bandar Road
- Length: 6.1 km (3.8 mi)
- Location: Karachi, Pakistan
- South end: Jinnah Bridge
- Major junctions: I.I. Chundrigar Road; Numaish Chowrangi; Gurumandir Chowrangi
- North end: Gurumandir Chowrangi roundabout

Muhammad Ali Jinnah Road (Urdu: شاہراہ محمد على جناح), frequently abbreviated as MA Jinnah Road, is a major thoroughfare in central Karachi, Pakistan. The road was originally named Bandar Road (بندر روڈ; "Port Road"), because it linked the city to the Port of Karachi, but was later renamed in honour of Pakistan's founder, Muhammad Ali Jinnah. MA Jinnah Road stretches 6.1 kilometres from Jinnah Bridge in the south, near the Port of Karachi, to Gurumandir Chowk, north of Mazar-e-Quaid. It is one of the city's oldest roads, and passes through much of the colonial era historic core of Karachi, with numerous landmarks along its route.

== History ==
During Talpur rule, the Rah-i-Bandar road was built to connect the city's port to the caravan terminals in what is now the Serai Quarter. The Rah-i-Bandar in the 1860s would eventually be further developed by the British into Bandar Road. In 1949, the road was renamed after Muhammad Ali Jinnah, the founder of Pakistan.

== Route ==
MA Jinnah Road stretches 6.1 kilometres from Jinnah Bridge in the south, to Gurumandir Chowk, north of Mazar-e-Quaid. Numerous landmarks are sited along this road, including (from southwest to northeast): the Karachi Port Trust Building, Merewether Clock Tower, New Memon Masjid, Denso Hall, City Courts at Nanakwara, Karachi Municipal Corporation Building, Swaminarayan Mandir, Khaliq Dina Hall, NJV Government Higher Secondary School, and Mazar-e-Quaid (Jinnah Mausoleum). It terminates at the Gurumandir Chowrangi roundabout, where several major roads converge, including: Business Recorder Road, Jehangir Road, Jamshed Road, Jigar Muradabadi Road, and Clayton Road.

== Gallery ==
The following are heritage buildings along MA Jinnah Road which are protected by the Government of Sindh. Buildings are listed from the southwest end of the road to its northwest end :

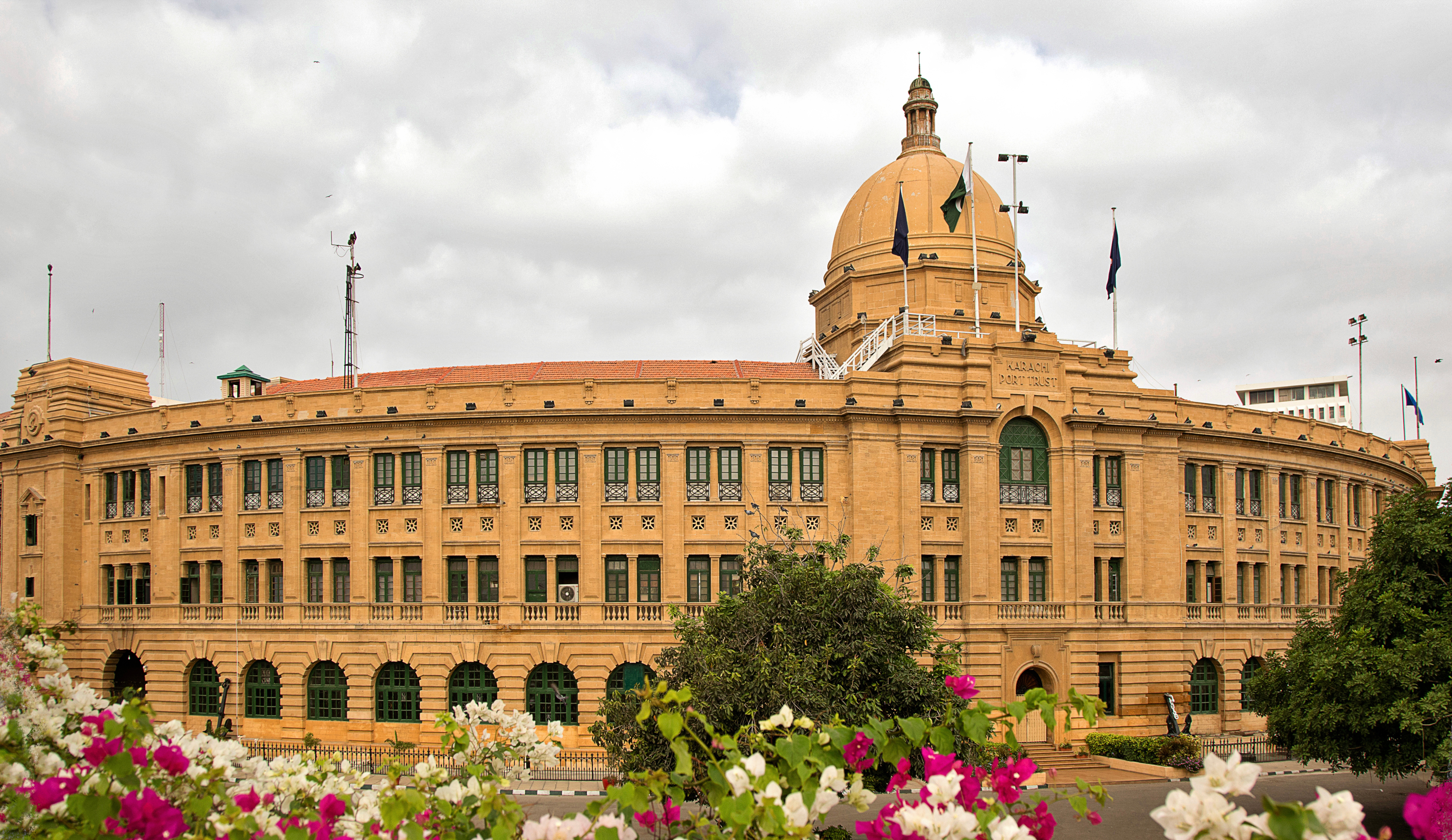
Karachi Port Trust Building

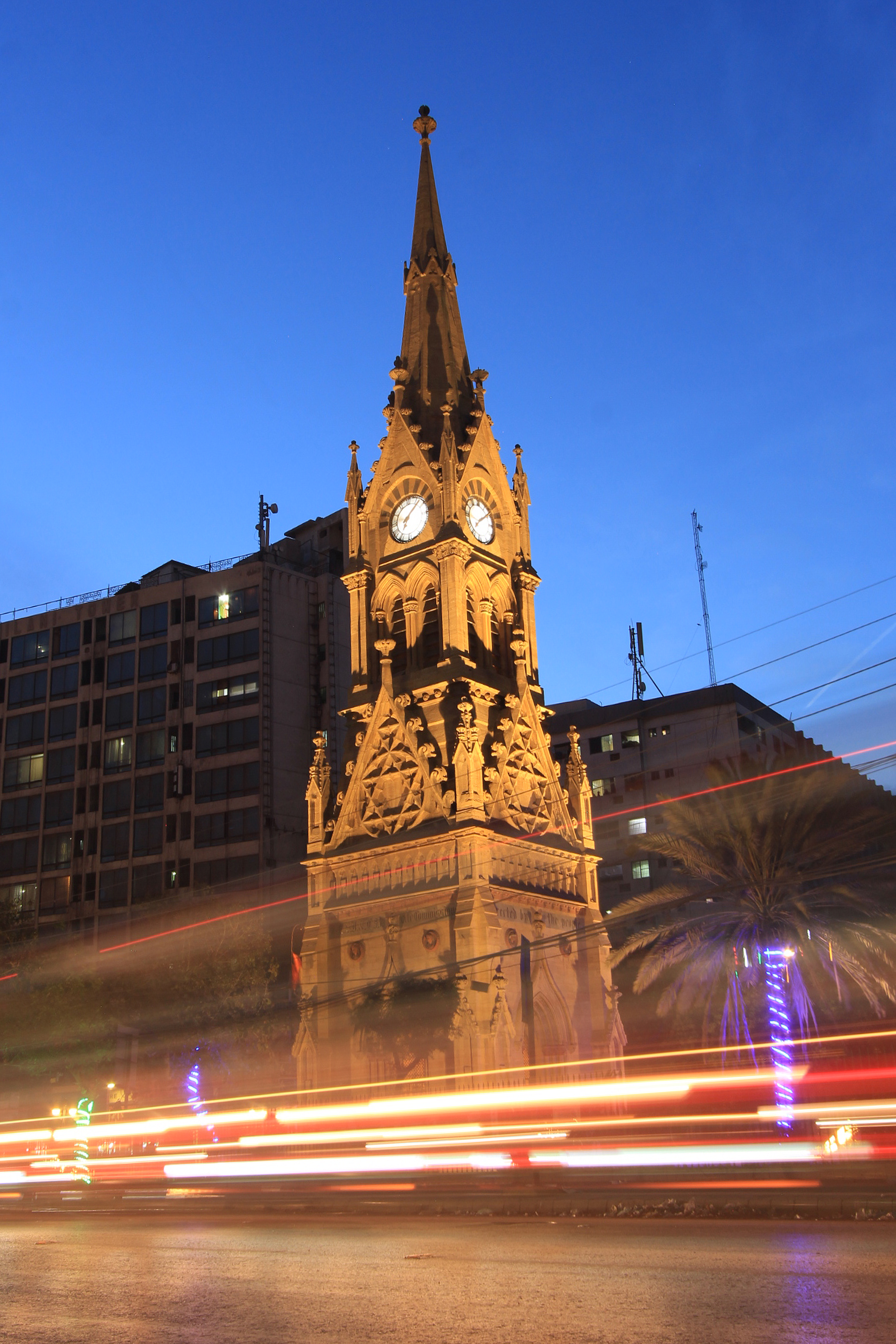
Merewether Clock Tower

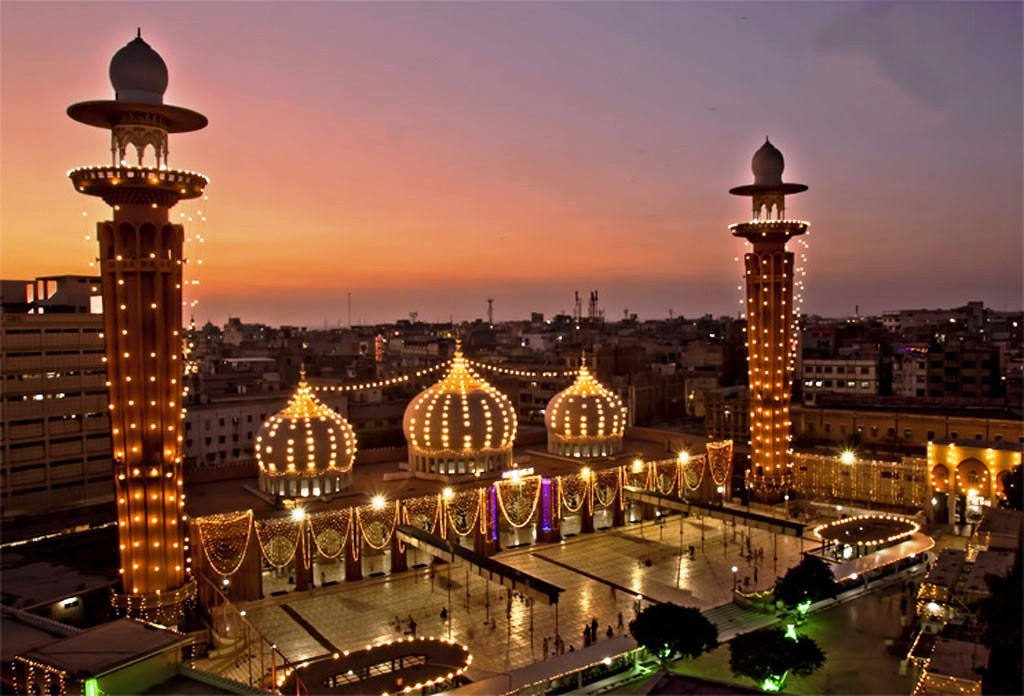
New Memon Masjid

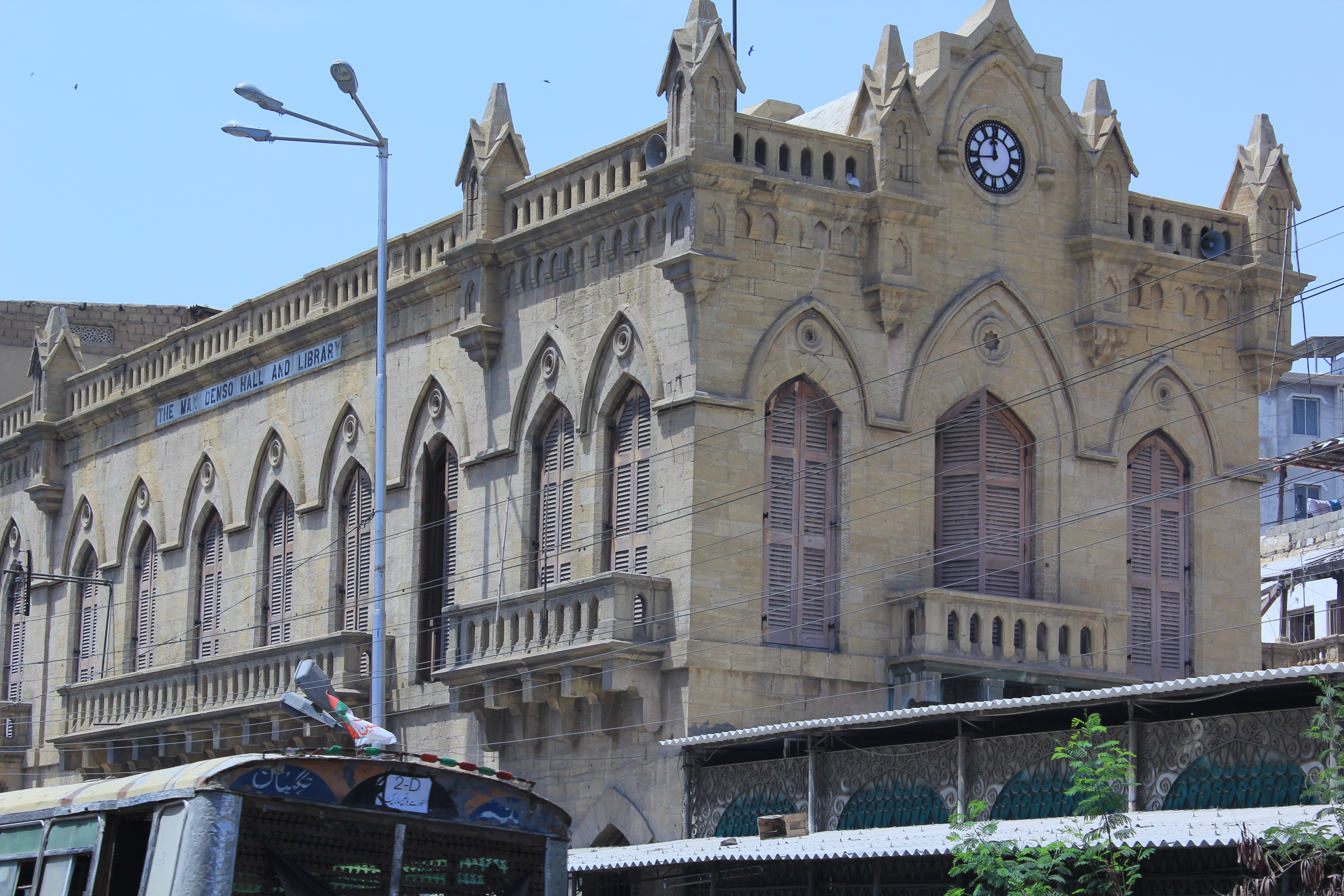
Denso Hall

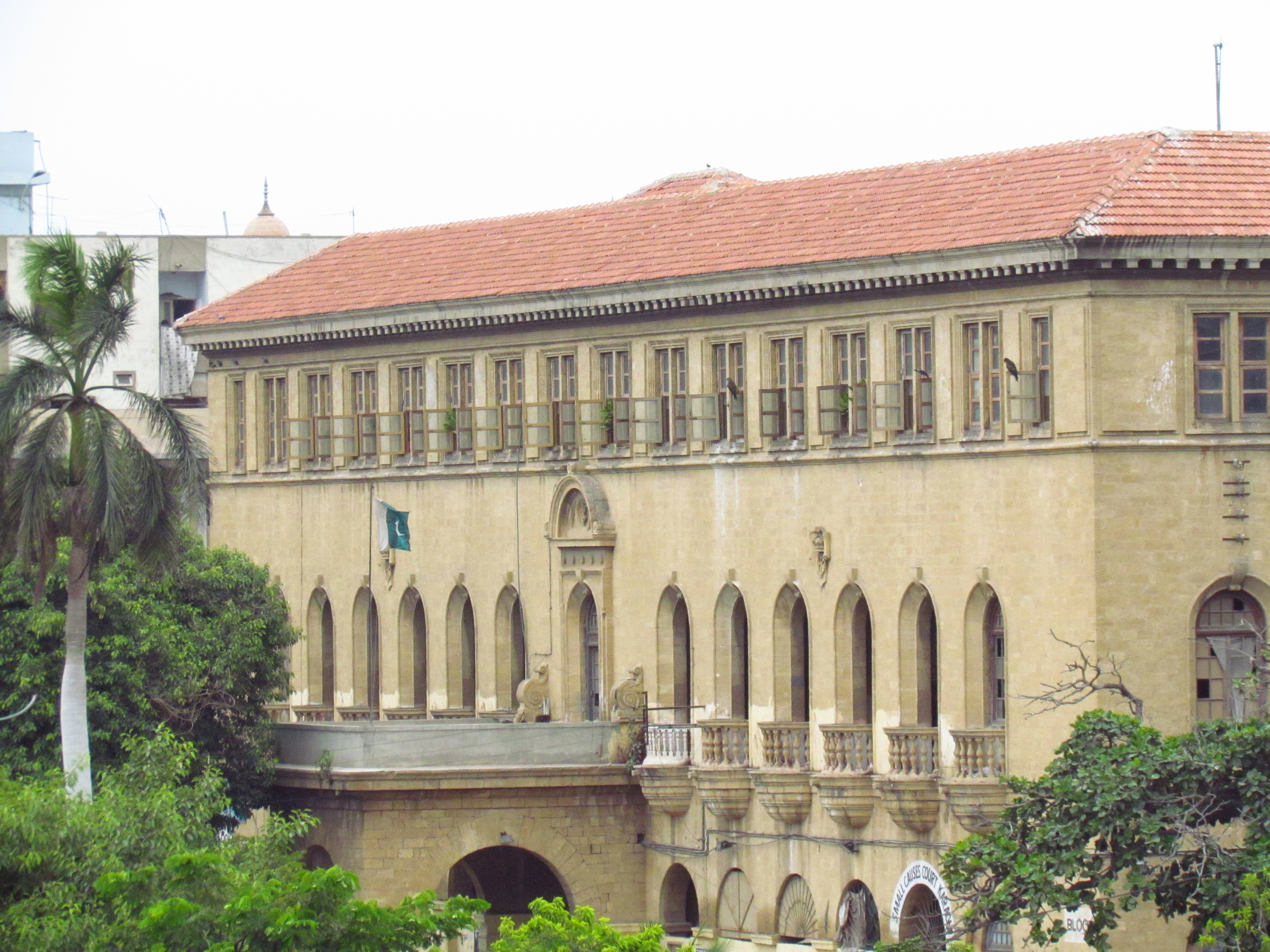
City Courts at Nanak Wara

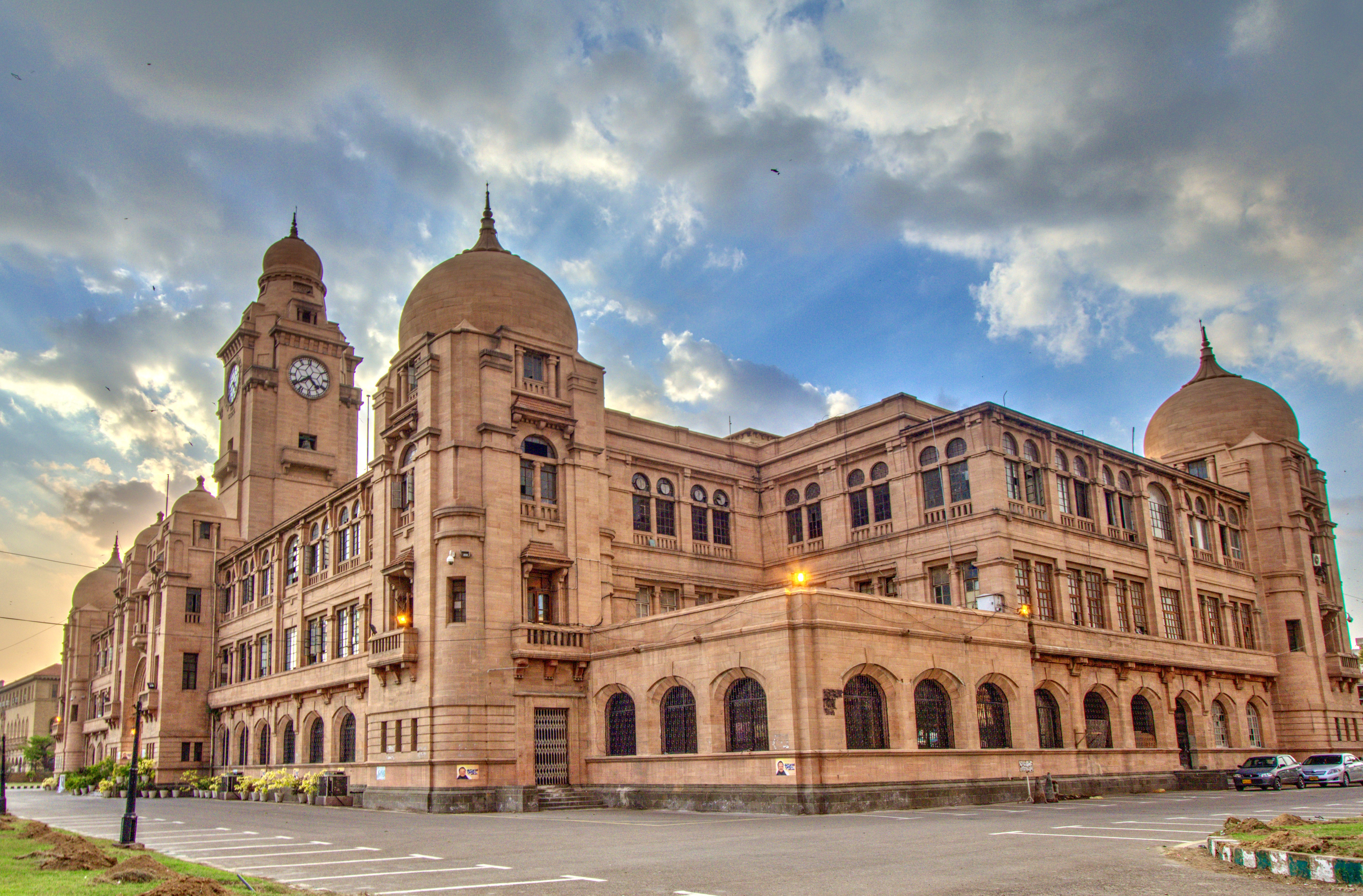
Karachi Metropolitan Corporation Building

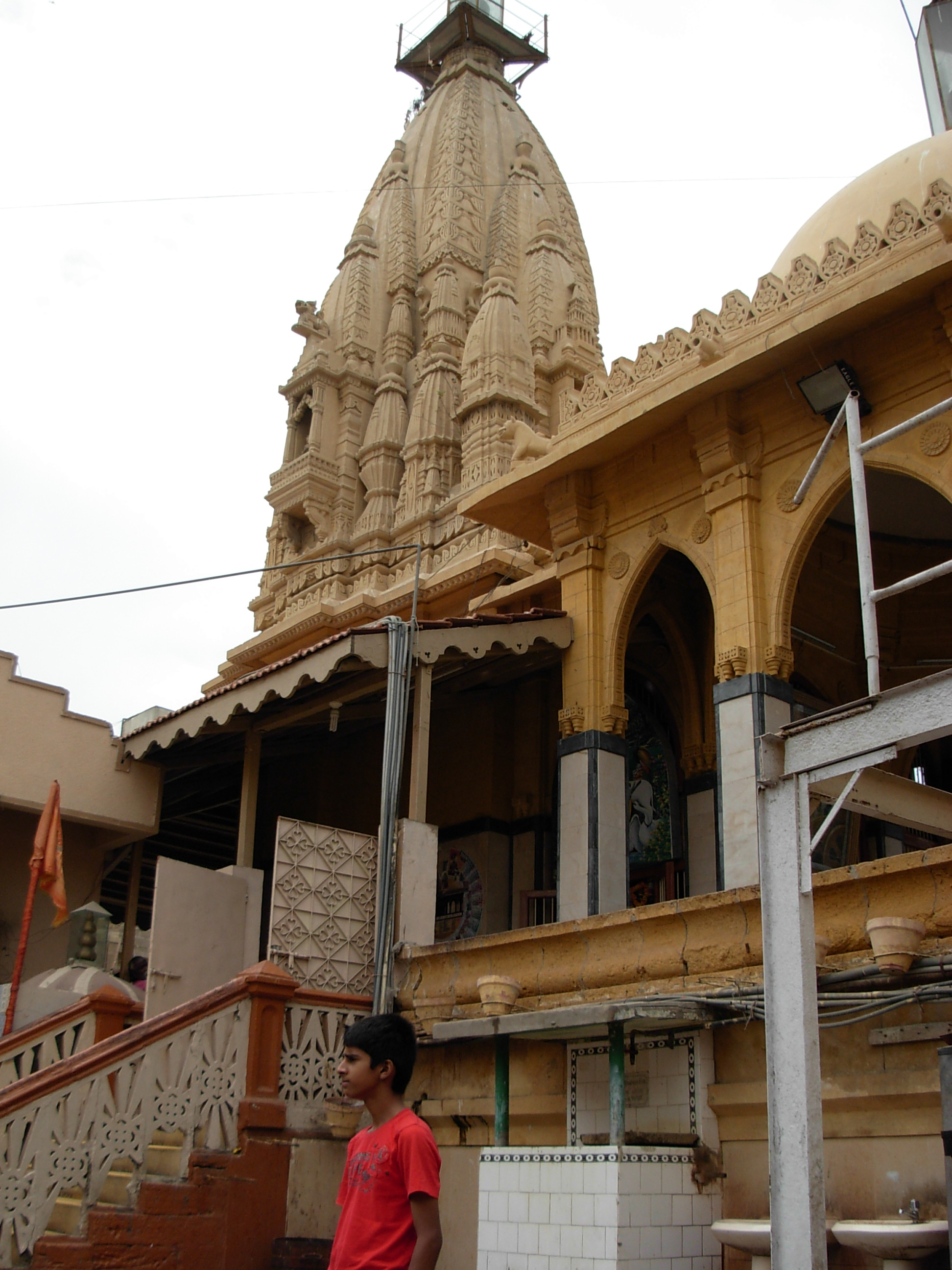
Shri Swaminarayan Mandir

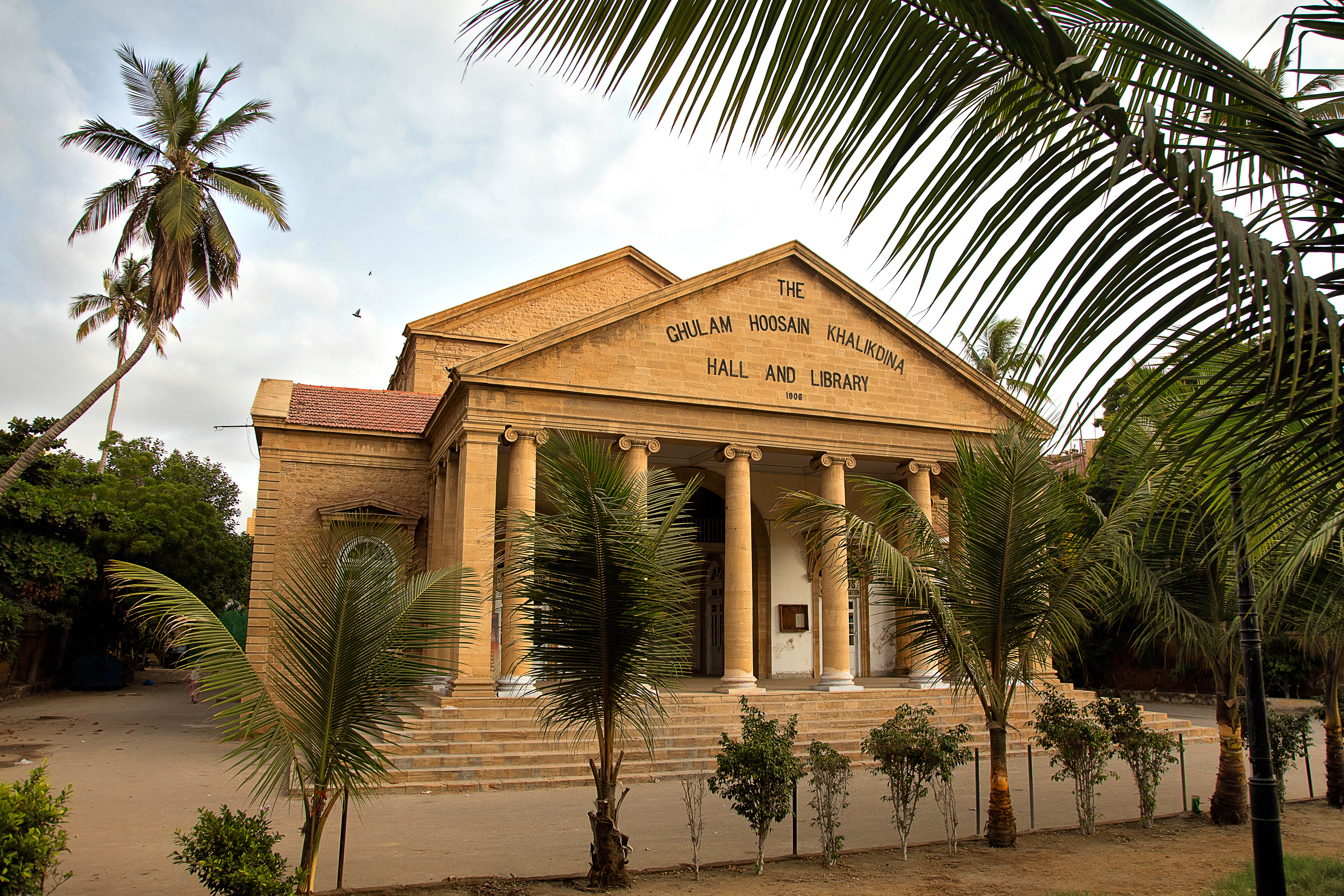
Khaliq Dina Hall

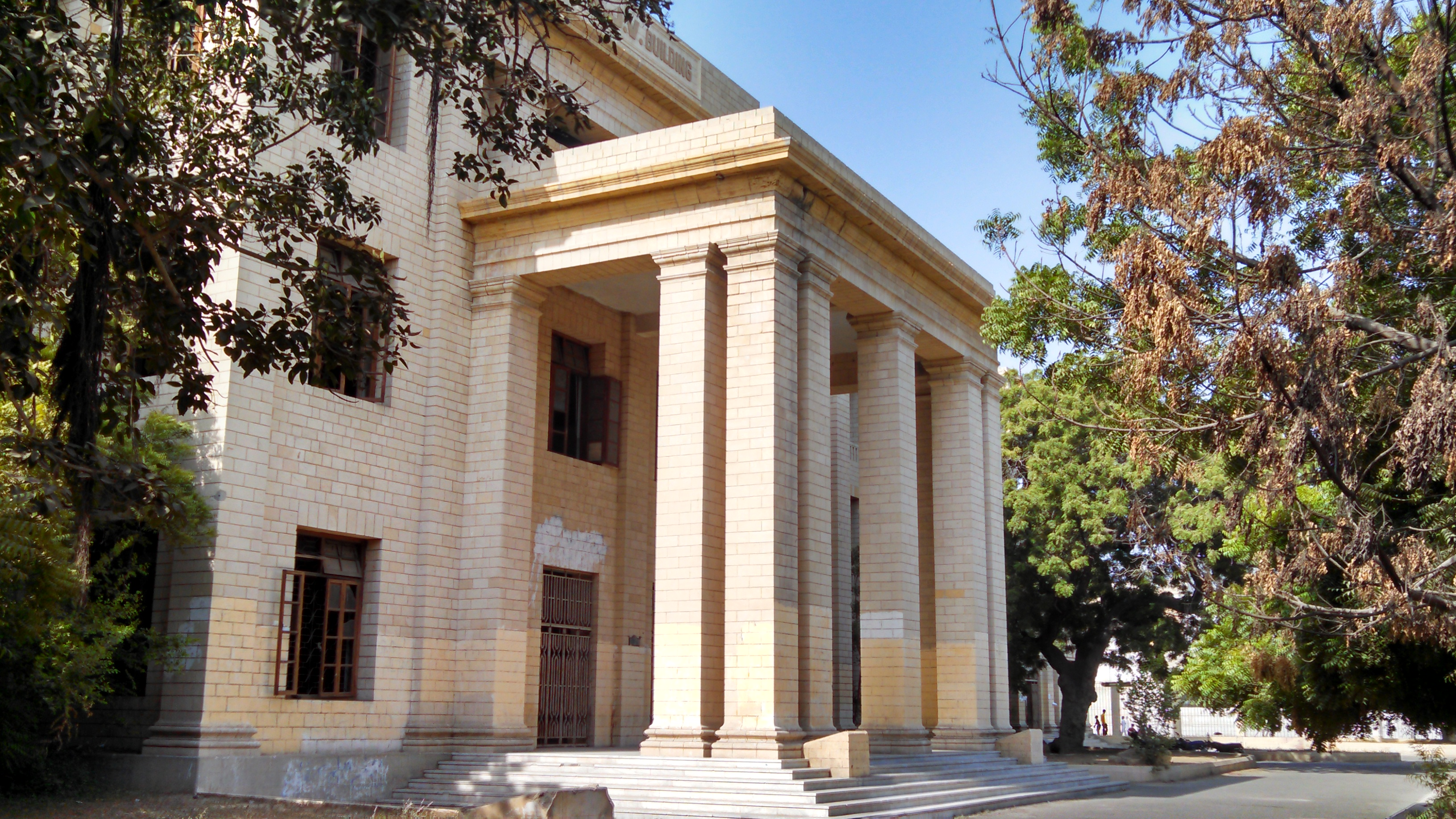
NJV Government Higher Secondary School

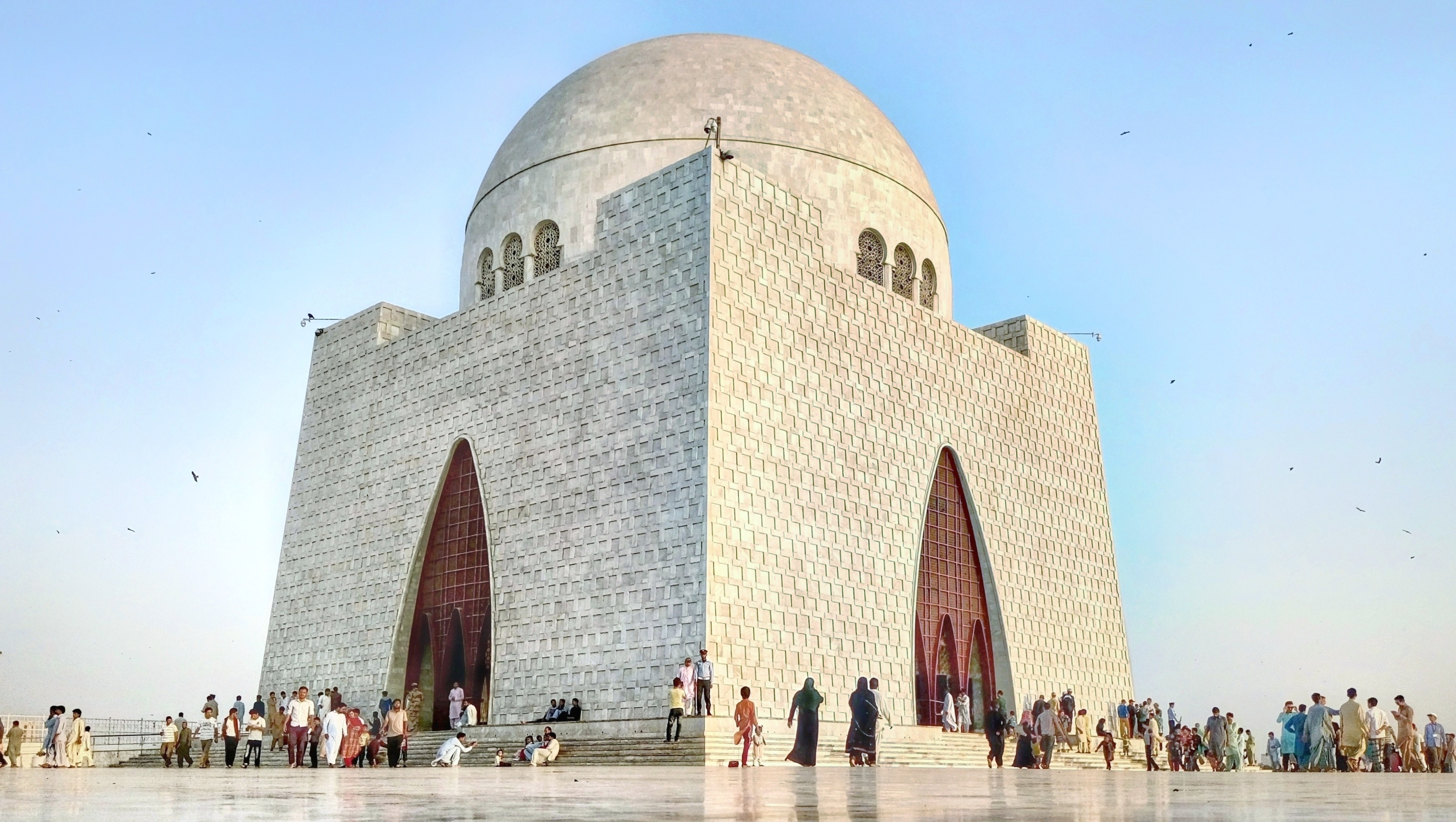
Mazar-e-Quaid

== See also ==
- List of streets of Karachi
- Richmond Crawford Veterinary Hospital
