= Sham-i-Ghareban =

Shi'ite mourning night

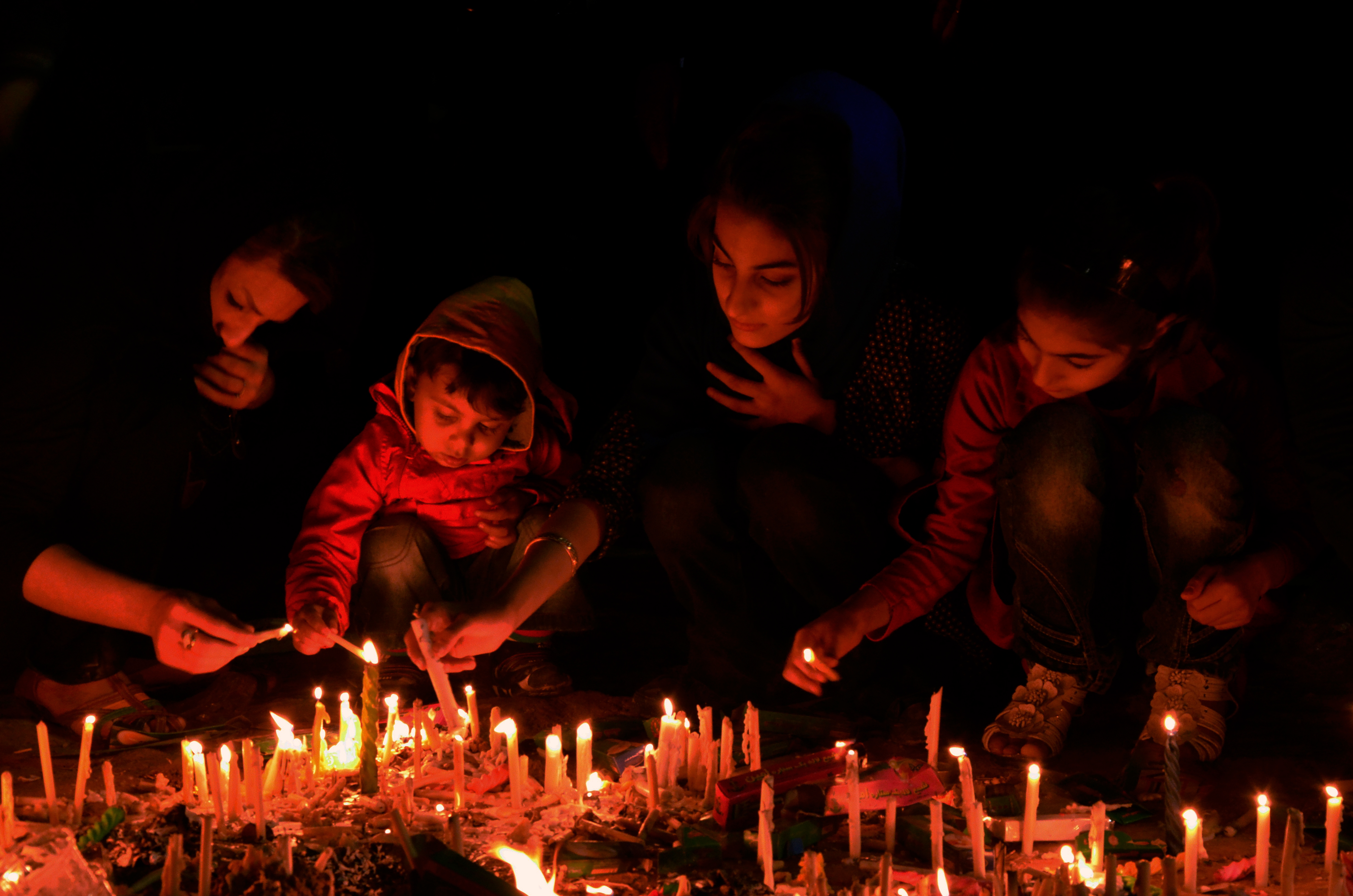
Shi'ite people participating in mourning during Sham-i-Ghareban

Sham-e-Ghariban (شام غریباں ) is a mourning night of Shi'Ites which is observed between 10th Muharram and 11th Muharram. The word Sham means night and Ghariban means poor or oppressed, thus this night remarks sacrifice and tolerance of the oppressed people of Ahlebait in Karbala. So, it is called Sham-e-Ghariban. On 11th Muharram the holy members of Ahlebait were arrested. The next day, the holy prisoners reached Kufa in the palace of Ibn Ziyad. It is the main night in Muharram. On this night people gather to say Noha and Marsiya. Mourners beat their chests, recite Ziyarat Ashura and take out processions.
