= Narayan Jagannath Vaidya =

Narayan Jagannath Vaidya was the first deputy inspector of Sindh (currently in Pakistan). At the time, it was part of the Bombay Presidency. He was the brother of Lakshman Jagannath Vaidya. He belonged to the CKP community of Maharashtra.The Narayan Jagannath High School in Pakistan is named after him.
