= Nishtar Park =

Public park in Karachi, Pakistan

Coordinates: 24.8747648°N 67.0331061°E

- نشتر پارک
- Interactive map of Nishtar Park
- Type: Urban park
- Location: Shahnawaz Bhutto Rd, Soldier Bazaar Jamshed Town, Karachi.
- Area: 450 acres (1,800,000 m^{2})
- Administered by: Karachi Metropolitan Corporation

The Nishtar Park (Urdu: نشتر پارک), formerly known as Patel Park, is a park located at Soldier Bazaar, Jamshed Town, Karachi.

== History ==
Nishtar Park was originally called Patel Park, named after Congress leader Vallabhbhai Patel. It was then renamed after Sardar Abdur Rab Nishtar, one of the main leaders of Pakistan Movement, in 1965. The biggest gathering of Shia Muslims also takes place in Muharram as well as most other religious and political gatherings.

The park was used for political gatherings by several politicians. Some started their political careers from this park, like Zulfikar Ali Bhutto, in January 1971 when he started his election campaign and delivered on 14 March 1971 a famous speech.

During the largest gathering of Shia Muslims in Karachi in the month of Muharram prominent Shia scholars such as Allama Rasheed Turabi and Allama Talib Jauhari used to address the majlis for many years until their death. Nowadays, Allama Syed Shehanshah Hussain Naqvi addresses this great majlis.

On 11 April 2006, at least 50 people were killed, and more than 100 injured, when a bomb exploded at Nishtar Park. (See also: Nishtar Park bombing).

Formerly, it was home ground of Rangers Cricket Club and Jang Cricket Club.

== See also ==
- List of parks in Karachi
- List of parks and gardens in Pakistan
- List of parks and gardens in Lahore
- List of parks and gardens in Karachi
- Nishtar Park bombing
