= Lakshman Jagannath Vaidya =

Dewan of Baroda (b. 1835)

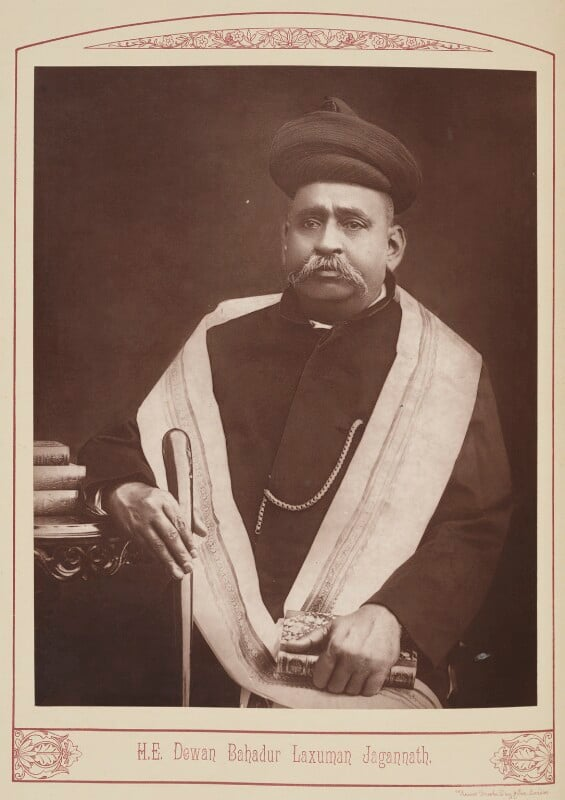
Vaidya c. 1889

His Excellency Lakshman Jagannath Vaidya (born 1835), also spelt Laxuman Jagannath Vaidya was Dewan Bahadur and the Dewan of Baroda State from 1886 to 1890. He was the brother of Narayan Jagannath Vaidya. He belonged to the CKP community of Maharashtra and started a scholarship for the CKP students in 1887.
