= Khaliq Dina Hall =

Library and hall building in Karachi, Pakistan

- خالق دینا ہال
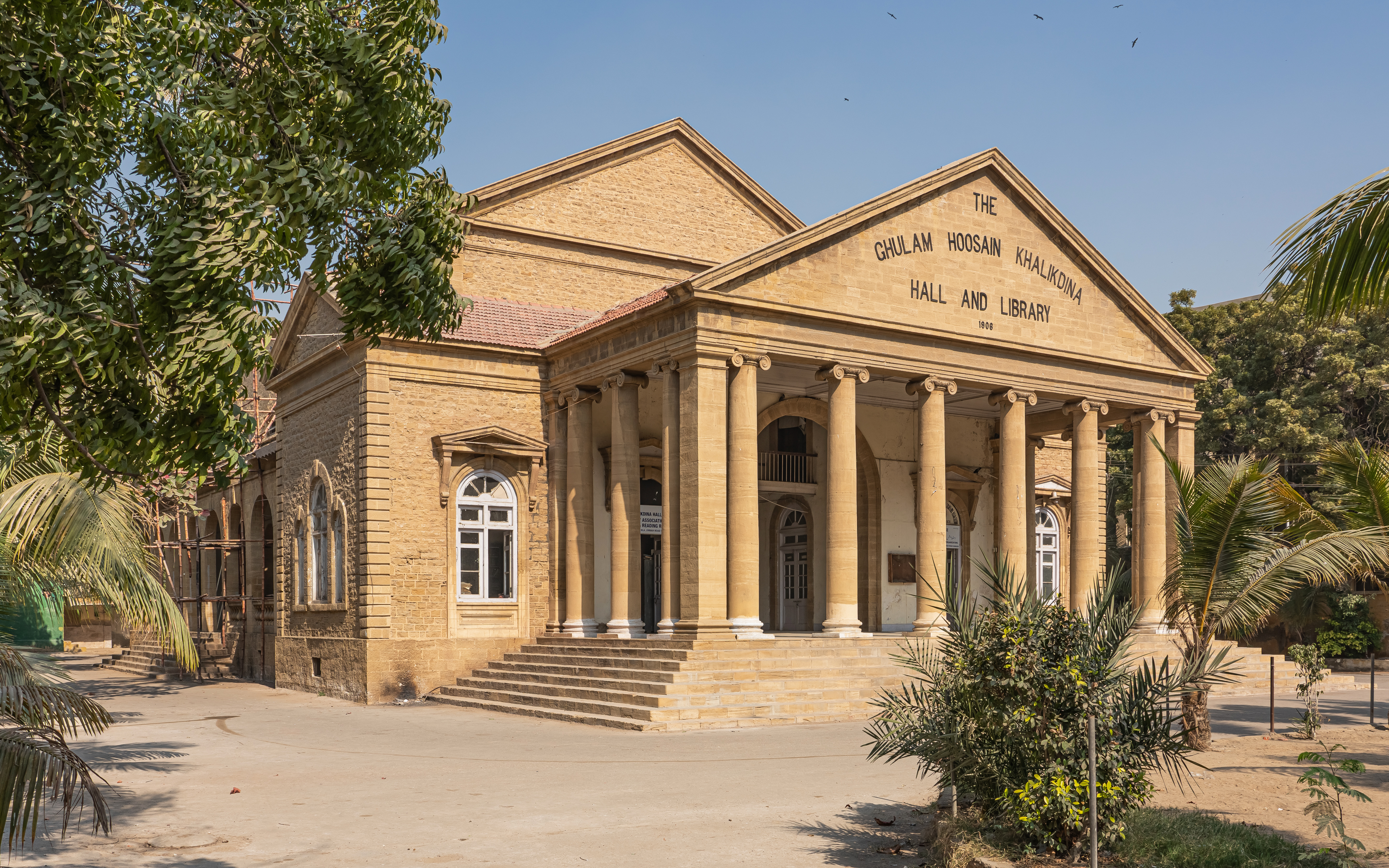
- Khaliq Dina Hall, completed in 1906

General information
- Type: Hall and library
- Architectural style: Palladian
- Location: MA Jinnah Road, Karachi, Pakistan
- Coordinates: 24°51′28″N 67°00′42″E
- Completed: 1906

Technical details
- Material: Sandstone

Design and construction
- Architect: Moses Somake

Khaliq Dina Hall (Urdu: خالق دینا ہال), also rendered as Khaliq Deena Hall, is a library and public hall located on MA Jinnah Road in Karachi, Pakistan. The building was completed in 1906 and designed by the Lahore-born Iraqi-Jewish architect Moses Somake in a Palladian style. It was named after Ghulam Hussain Khaliqdina, a Khoja merchant and philanthropist who contributed 18,000 of the total 33,000 rupees required for construction, with the remainder provided by the Karachi Municipal Corporation. The hall has hosted significant political and religious events since its opening and is now protected as a cultural heritage site of Sindh.

== History ==
=== Foundation and construction ===
The building's predecessor, the Native General Library, was established in 1856. In 1902, Ghulam Hussain Khaliqdina donated 18,000 rupees towards the construction of the present building, with the remaining 15,000 rupees funded by the Karachi Municipal Corporation. The building was completed in 1906.

Khaliqdina was also instrumental in the establishment of Sindh Madressatul Islam. Raised in the Khoja tradition of Shia Islam, he was subsequently condemned by the Aga Khan for his engagement with the Twelver branch of Shia Islam, leading him to renounce the Khoja tradition and convert to Twelver Shia Islam.

=== Colonial and early independence period ===
In 1921, Khaliq Dina Hall served as the venue for what became known as the Trial of Sedition, in which British authorities prosecuted Maulana Shaukat Ali and Maulana Mohammad Ali Jouhar on charges of mutiny arising from speeches they made in support of the Khilafat Movement.

On 20 February 1949, the hall hosted the first session of the Pakistan Muslim League Council following the country's independence, attended by Pakistan's first Prime Minister, Liaquat Ali Khan. The hall was also used after independence as a site for Majlis gatherings during the final ten days of Muharram, addressed by Islamic scholars including Allama Rasheed Turabi, Allama Aqeel Turabi and Dr Kalbe Sadiq.

=== Later history ===
In 1970, Dada Amir Haider Khan, a Communist activist, delivered a speech at the hall. The hall also served as a meeting venue for the left-wing National Students Federation. In 1994, the original teak roof collapsed during a heavy rainstorm.

== Architecture ==
The building was designed by Moses Somake, an Iraqi-Jewish architect born in Lahore, in a Palladian style. Its principal external feature is a veranda approximately ten feet wide, fronted by twelve Ionic pillars in the Greek style supporting a triangular pediment. The pediment bears the inscription "Ghulam Hoosain Khalikdina Hall and Library 1906".

The building's exterior measures 160 by 99 meters., with an interior hall 28.9 meters in length and 13.7 meters in width. The interior ceiling height is 9.1 meters, and the main hall can seat approximately 600 persons. The original pitched roof was constructed of teak wood.

== Conservation ==
The hall was renovated in 1959 in advance of an address by President Ayub Khan. Restoration of the collapsed roof commenced in 1996. A further restoration was carried out in 2002 by the Karachi Metropolitan Corporation at a cost of 15 million rupees. The building is now protected as a cultural heritage site of Sindh.

A subsequent restoration was undertaken by Numaish Karachi, a cultural organisation, under its Reading Room initiative, in collaboration with the Karachi Metropolitan Corporation, and funded by the British Council's Cultural Protection Fund in partnership with the UK government's Department for Culture, Media and Sport. The restored hall was inaugurated on 16 December 2024 by Karachi Mayor Barrister Murtaza Wahab and other civic officials. At the inauguration, the mayor described the restoration as part of a broader municipal effort to return Karachi's historic buildings to their original condition and to preserve them for future generations, citing comparable projects at Frere Hall and the Karachi Metropolitan Building.

Following the restoration, the hall hosted the Reading Room Festival on 30 November 2025, a public cultural event featuring workshops, panel discussions, theatrical performances and qawwali, with free admission.

The hall currently contains a public hall used for various events, a library, and a room occupied as an office by a local non-governmental organisation.

== See also ==
- List of cultural heritage sites in Sindh
- Frere Hall
