= Nishtar Park bombing =

Terrorist attack in Karachi

Coordinates: 24.8747648°N 67.0331061°E

A bombing targeting a religious gathering at Nishtar Park in Karachi, Pakistan on 11 April 2006, resulted in the killing of at least 49 people and injured around a hundred others.

== Details ==
At the time of the blast, a mawlid ceremony to mark the birthday of Muhammad organised by the Barelvi Jamaat Ahle Sunnat was taking place, in which tens of thousands of followers were gathered.

== Deceased ==
Among the dead were several Barelvi religious figures, including the senior leadership of the Jamaat Ahle Sunnat and the Sunni Tehreek. The notable leaders included Chief of Sunni Tehreek, Maulana Muhammad Abbas Qadri, central leaders Maulana Akram Qadri, Maulana Iftikhar Ahmad Bhatti, Dr. Qadeer Ahmad and Haji Haneef Billo, Hafiz Muhammad Taqi of other parties. Three men said to belong to the Lashkar-e-Jhangvi were indicted for the crime.
