= NJV Government Higher Secondary School =

Government school in Pakistan

Coordinates: 24.8620°N 67.0189°E

Narayan Jagannath Vaidya Government Higher Secondary School
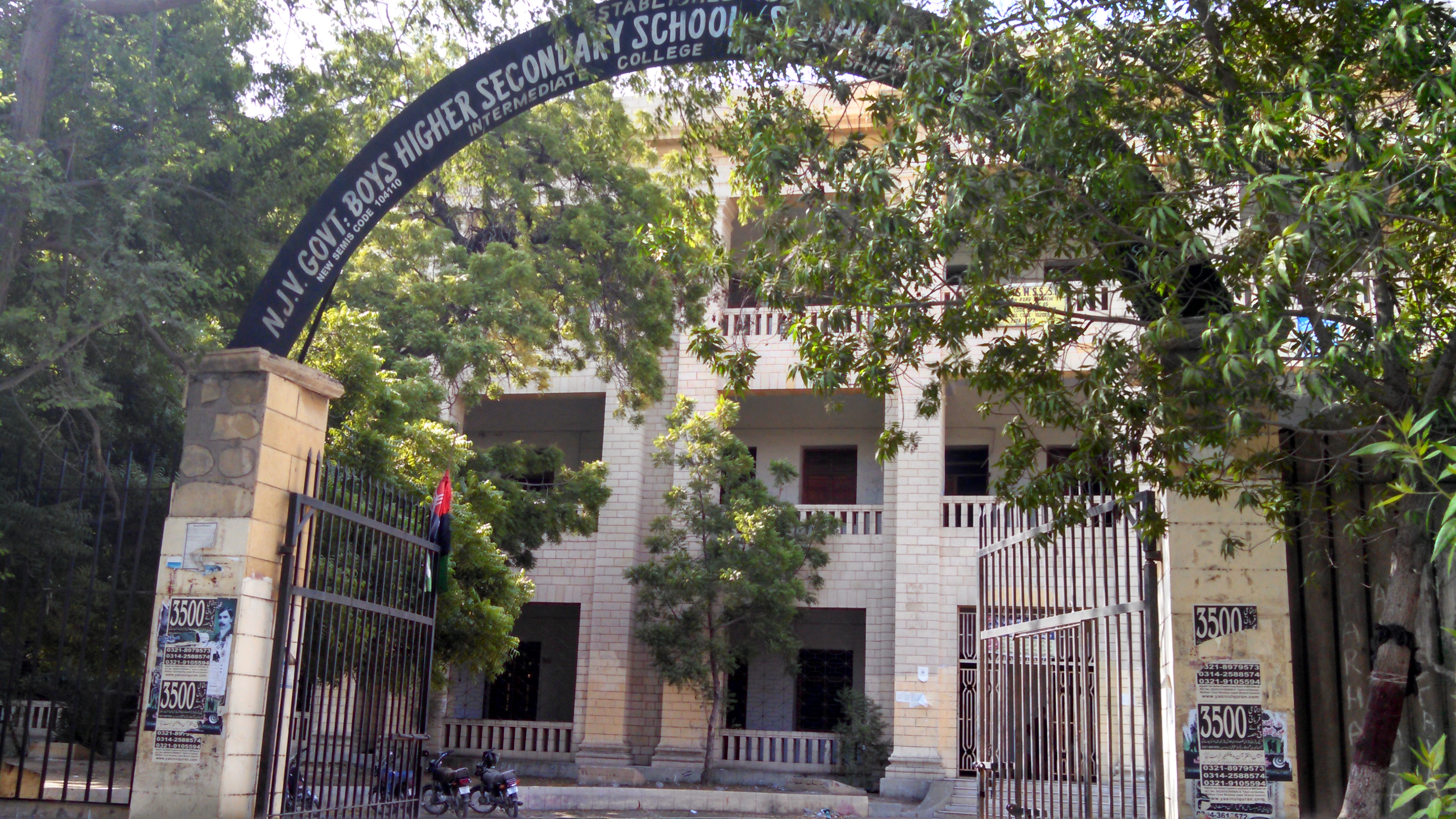
- Karachi, Sindh, Pakistan

Information
- Type: Government School
- Established: October 1855
- Enrollment: 1477 (March 1916)
- Website: njv.edu.pk

The Narayan Jagannath Vaidya Government Higher Secondary School at Karachi is the first government school established in Sindh, Pakistan. Its building's served as first assembly hall for Sindh in 1947.

== History ==
It was opened in October 1855 with 68 boys. Sir Bartle Farere was the founder of this school as first public school in Sindh. The original buildings were replaced by the present ones in 1876. It was named after the visionary Narayan Jagannath Vaidya after his death. The building was made of yellow sandstone, and is one of the 600 buildings listed as a heritage site.

In March 1916, the school had 1477 students, of whom 1350 were Hindus, 32 Brahmins, 10 Jains, 12 Muslims, 66 Parsis and 7 Indian Jews.

After Partition in Pakistan 1947, the Sindh Assembly convened in that building to carry out their meetings and tasks. Eventually they shifted and the building was converted back into a school. Unfortunately because it was a government school, it slowly fell into disrepair as the teachers neglected their jobs, the students failed to properly attend, the classes did not happen and the building fell apart. Its public infrastructure was never updated which meant its bathrooms were broken with no water, lack of electricity, and no janitorial/security staff to maintain the building.

In 2016, an MOU was signed between the Akhuwat Foundation and NJV High School with the understanding that the provision of funds would be utilized to restore the historic model school status of the institution. Under the leadership of the Akhuwat Director of Education, Mr. Uzair Qarni who was hired on a one-year contract, the building underwent mass renovation including bathrooms, electricity, building repair, repainting, provision of water etc. Moreover, they redesigned the school's curriculum, planted grass for the playgrounds, and installed solar panels. They forced teachers to take the classes by keeping a daily diary of their lessons. The government staff were trained to use computers, trained to have their own emails for communication and learned to type. A computer lab was set up with laptops, each with Rosetta Stone and Khan Academy lessons installed in it.

Additionally, the students are provided with free transport, uniforms, food and snacks, and books.

== Notable alumni ==
- Jamshed Nusserwanjee Mehta, the first mayor of Karachi in 1933
