= Dinshaw =

Dinshaw is a given name and a surname. Notable people with the name include:

Surname

- Carolyn Dinshaw, American academic and author, specialising in gender and sexuality in the mediaeval context
- Jay Dinshaw (1933–2000), founder and president of the American Vegan Society, editor of the Ahimsa magazine
- Ketayun Ardeshir Dinshaw FRCR (1943–2011), developed cancer care and radiation therapy in India
- Nadirshaw Edulji Dinshaw (1842–1914), eldest son of the Karachi landowner and philanthropist Seth Edulji Dinshaw
- Rusi Dinshaw (1928–2014), Pakistani cricketer
- Seth Edulji Dinshaw CIE (1842–1914), Karachi-based Parsi philanthropist during the British colonial era

Given name

- Cowasji Dinshaw Adenwalla CIE (1827–1900), trader who emigrated from Surat/Bombay
- Dinshaw Bilimoria (1904–1942), Indian actor and director
- Dinshaw Eduljee (1919–1944), the first pilot of the Indian Air Force, IAF, to receive the Air Force Cross
- Dinshaw Patel, structural biologist in New York City
- Bomanjee Dinshaw Petit (1859–1915), son of Sir Dinshaw Maneckjee Petit and a cotton mill owner and philanthropist from Bombay
- Dinshaw Maneckji Petit (1823–1901), Parsi entrepreneur, philanthropist and founder of the first textile mills in India
- Dinshaw Edulji Wacha (1844–1936), Parsi politician from Bombay

== See also ==
- Dinshaw Wachha Road, road between two of the most poshest localities in town, which are Churchgate and Mantralaya
- Edulji Dinshaw Dispensary, a building in the Saddar neighborhood of central Karachi, Pakistan
- Dan Shaw
- Denshaw
- Dunshah
