= J. F. R. Jacob =

Indian Army officer and statesman (1923–2016)

Lieutenant General Jack Farj Rafael Jacob PVSM
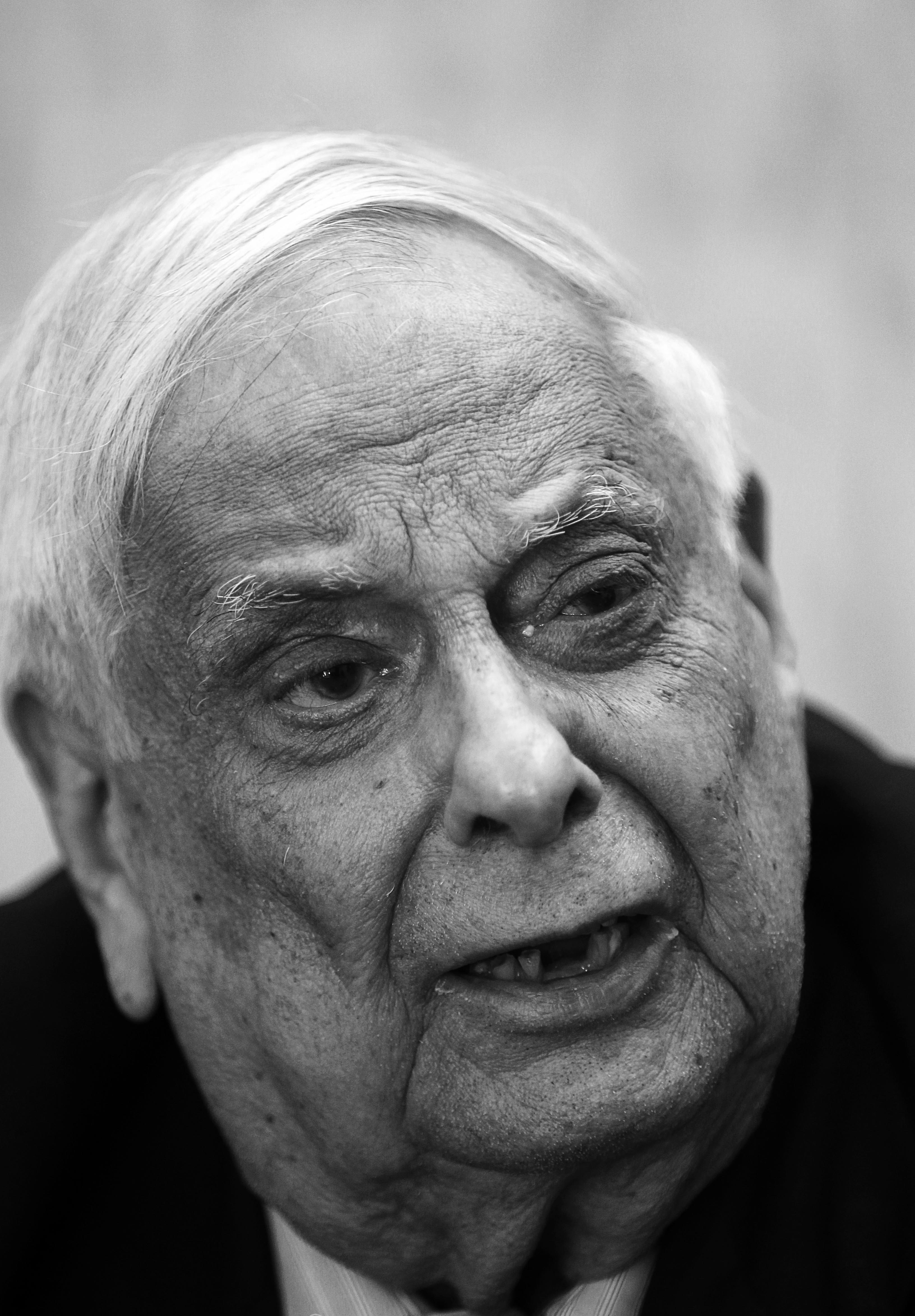
- JFR Jacob in 2012

24th Governor of Punjab 11th Administrator of Chandigarh
- In office 27 November 1999 – 8 May 2003
- Chief Minister: Parkash Singh Badal; Amarinder Singh
- Preceded by: B. K. N. Chhibber
- Succeeded by: O. P. Verma

9th Governor of Goa
- In office 19 April 1998 – 26 November 1999
- Chief Minister: Pratapsingh Rane (1998); Luizinho Faleiro (1998–1999); Francisco Sardinha (1999)
- Preceded by: T. R. Satish Chandran
- Succeeded by: Mohammed Fazal

Personal details
- Born: Jack Farj Rafael Jacob; 2 May 1921 (Note: As given in the pre-Independence Indian Army List.) Calcutta, Bengal Presidency, British India (Now, Kolkata, West Bengal, India)
- Died: 13 January 2016 (aged 94) New Delhi, India
- Awards: Param Vishisht Seva Medal; Commendation of Merit; Friends of Liberation War Honour
- Military career
- Allegiance: British India; India
- Branch: British Indian Army; Indian Army
- Service years: 7 June 1942 – 31 July 1978
- Rank: Lieutenant General
- Service number: IC-470
- Commands: Eastern Command; XVI Corps; 12 Infantry Division
- Conflicts: World War II; Tunisia Campaign; Burma Campaign; Indo-Pakistan War of 1965; Indo-Pakistan War of 1971

Jack Farj Rafael Jacob (2 May 1921 – 13 January 2016) was an Indian military officer. He was known for his role in the Bangladesh Liberation War of 1971. Jacob, then a major general, was the chief of staff of the Indian Army's Eastern Command. During his 36-year long career in the army, ending as a Lieutenant General, Jacob fought in World War II and the Indo-Pakistani War of 1965. He was later governor of the Indian states of Goa and Punjab.

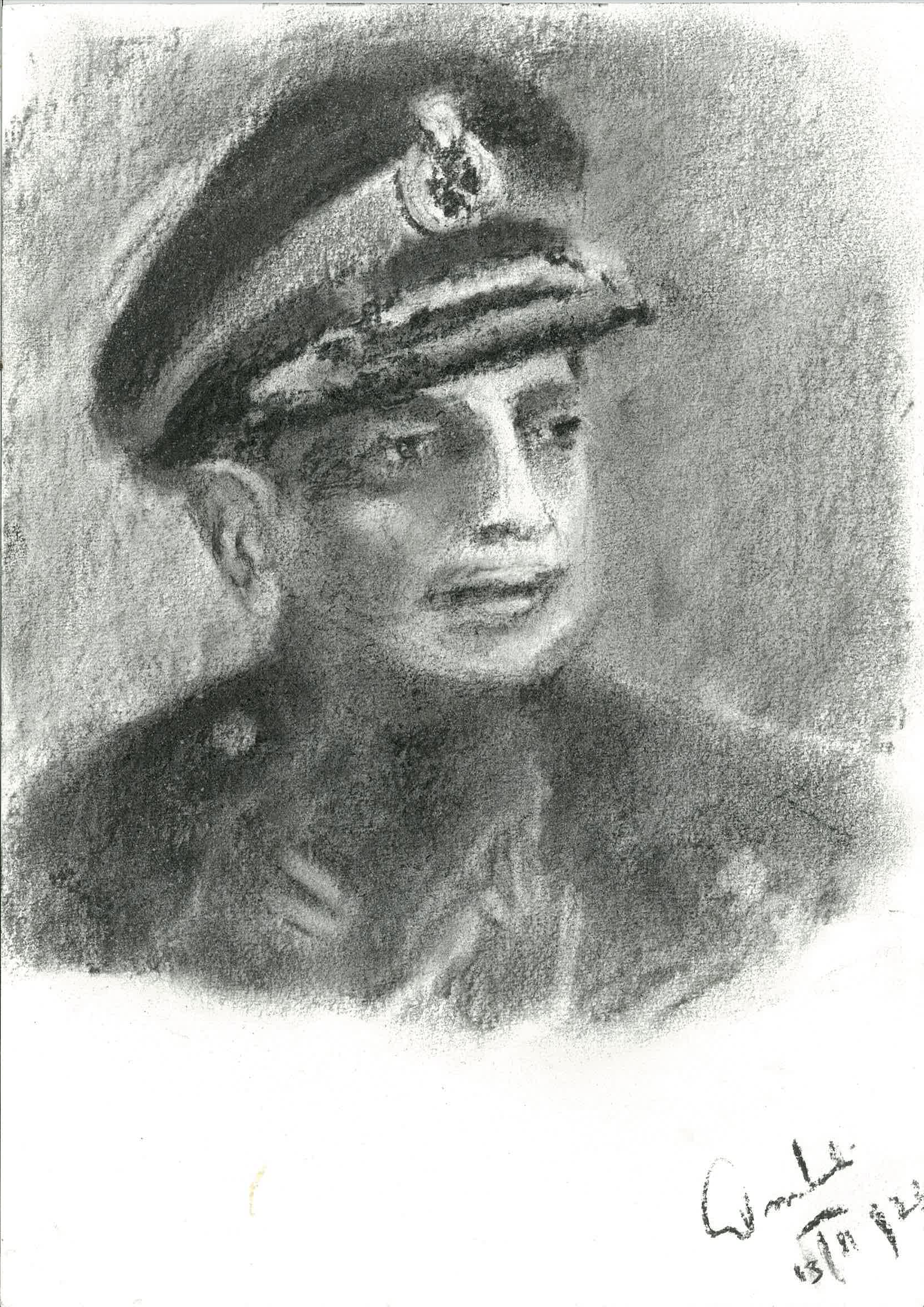
Drawing of Jacob by Amitabh Mitra

== Early life ==
Jacob was born in Calcutta to a deeply religious Baghdadi Jewish family originally from Iraq which had settled in Calcutta in the mid-19th century. His father, Elias Emanuel, was an affluent businessman. After his father became sick, Jacob was sent at the age of nine to Victoria Boys' School, a boarding school in Kurseong near Darjeeling. From then on, he went home only during school holidays.

Jacob, motivated by reports of the Holocaust of European Jews during World War II, enlisted in the British Indian Army in 1942 as "Jack Frederick Ralph Jacob." His father objected to his enlisting. Jacob said in 2010, "I am proud to be a Jew, but am Indian through and through."

== Military career ==
=== Early career ===
Jacob graduated from the Officers' Training School (OTS) in Mhow in 1942, and received an emergency commission as a second lieutenant on 7 June. He was initially posted to northern Iraq in anticipation of a possible German attempt to seize the oil fields of Kirkuk, and was promoted war-substantive lieutenant on 7 December.

In 1943, Jacob was transferred to an artillery brigade that was dispatched to Tunisia to reinforce the British Army against Field Marshal Erwin Rommel's Afrika Korps. The brigade arrived after the Axis surrender. From 1943 to the end of the war, Jacob's unit fought in the Burma Campaign against the Empire of Japan. In the wake of Japan's defeat, he was assigned to Sumatra.

On 27 October 1945, Jacob was granted a permanent commission in the rank of lieutenant. After World War II, he attended and graduated from artillery schools in England and the United States, specialising in advanced artillery and missiles. He returned to India following its partition, and joined the Indian Army.

=== Post-Independence ===
In May 1951, Jacob was selected to attend the Defence Services Staff College, Wellington, the staff course started in October of the same year. As the first commanding officer, he raised 3 Field Regiment on 14 May 1956. On 20 May 1964, he was given command of an artillery brigade, with the acting rank of brigadier. During the Indo-Pakistani War of 1965, he commanded an Infantry Division, which later became the 12th Infantry Division, in the state of Rajasthan. During this period, Jacob composed an Indian Army manual on desert warfare.

Jacob was promoted to substantive brigadier on 17 January 1966, and took command of an infantry brigade on 30 September. On 2 October 1967, he was promoted to the acting rank of major general and was given command of an infantry division, with promotion to the substantive rank on 10 June 1968. On 29 April 1969, he was appointed the chief of staff (COS) of the Eastern Command, by General Sam Manekshaw (later Field Marshal). As the COS, Jacob's immediate superior was Lieutenant General Jagjit Singh Aurora, the General officer commanding-in-chief (GOC-in-C) Eastern Command. Jacob was soon tasked with dealing with the mounting insurgency in Northeast India.

=== Bangladesh Liberation War ===
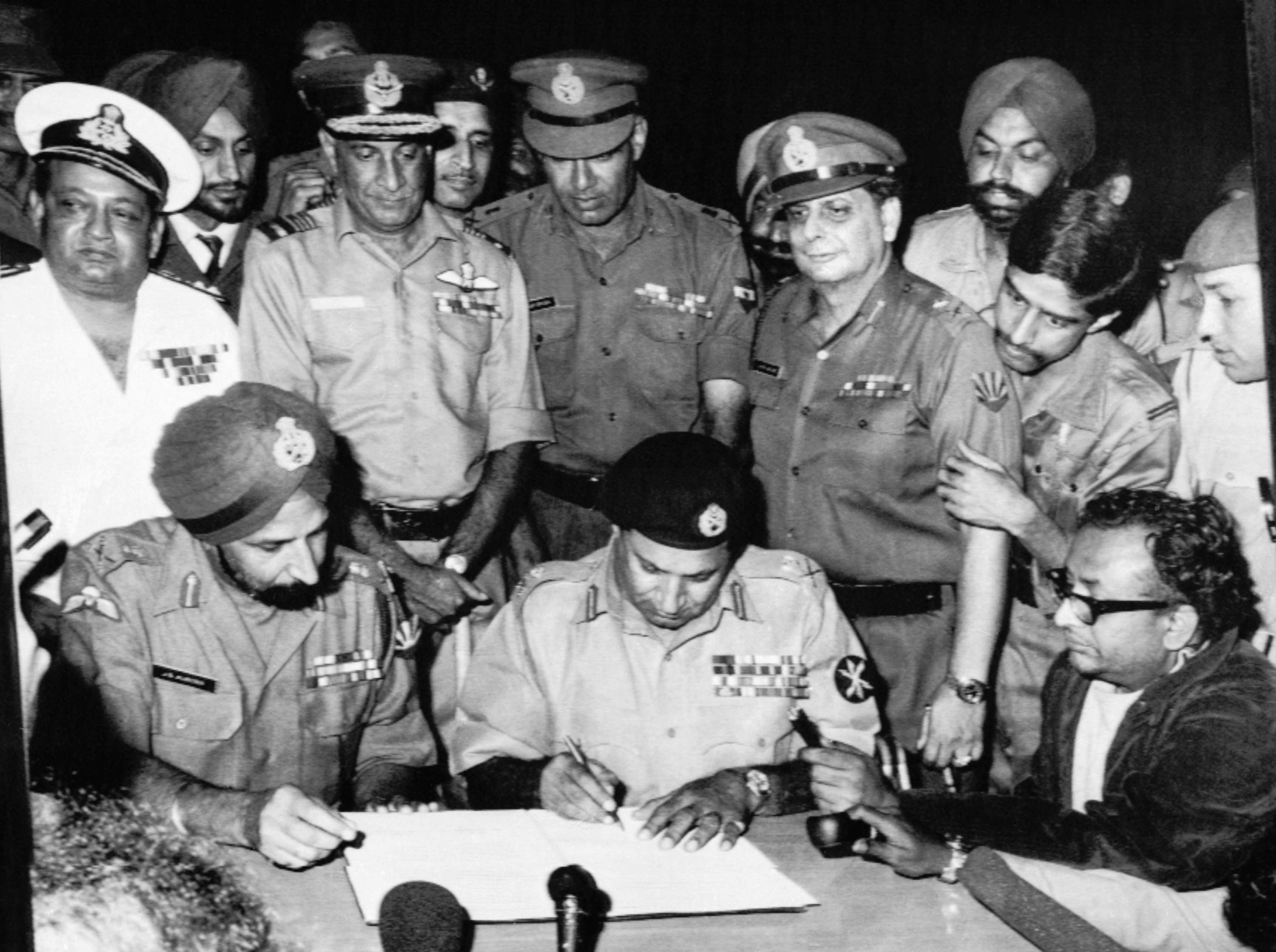
A. A. K. Niazi signing the instrument of surrender under the gaze of J. S. Aurora. Standing immediately behind (L-R) Nilkanta Krishnan, Hari Chand Dewan, Sagat Singh, Jacob (with Krishnamurthy peeping over his shoulder). Newscaster Surajit Sen of All India Radio is seen holding a microphone on the right

Jacob gained prominence during his stint as the chief of staff of the Eastern Command; the command helped to defeat the Pakistan Army in East Pakistan during the 1971 Bangladesh Liberation War. Jacob was awarded a commendation of merit for his role.

In March 1971, the Pakistan Army launched Operation Searchlight to stem the Bengali nationalist movement in East Pakistan. The action led to over 10 million refugees entering India, fuelling tensions between India and Pakistan. By the monsoon season Jacob—as chief of staff—was tasked with drawing the contingency plans in case of a conflict. After consulting with his superior officers, Jacob developed a plan for engaging Pakistan in a "war of movement" in the difficult and swampy terrain of East Pakistan.

An initial plan, given to the Eastern Command by Manekshaw, involved an incursion into East Pakistan and the capture of the provinces of Chittagong and Khulna. Senior Indian Army officers were reluctant to execute an aggressive invasion for fears of early ceasefire demands by the United Nations and a looming threat posed by China. That, together with the difficulty of navigating the marshy terrain of East Pakistan through three wide rivers, led the commanders to initially believe that the capture of all of East Pakistan was not possible. Jacob disagreed; his "war of movement" plan aimed to take control of all of East Pakistan. Jacob felt that the capital Dhaka was the geopolitical centre of the region, and that any successful campaign had to involve the eventual capture of Dhaka. Realising that the Pakistani Army's commander of its eastern command, A. A. K. Niazi, was going to fortify the towns and "defend them in strength", his plan was to bypass intermediary towns altogether, neutralise Pakistan's command and communication infrastructure, and use secondary routes to reach Dhaka. Jacob's plan was eventually approved by the Eastern Command.

The strategy eventually led to the capture of Dhaka. The Pakistani forces were selectively bypassed, their communication centres were captured and secured, and their command and control capabilities were destroyed. His campaign was planned for execution in three weeks, but was executed in under a fortnight.

On 16 December, during a lull in the battle, Jacob sought permission to visit Niazi to seek his surrender. He flew to Dhaka and obtained an unconditional surrender from Niazi, who later accused Jacob of blackmailing him into the surrender by threatening to order the annihilation of Pakistani troops in the east by bombing. Gen. Jacob made Niazi surrender publicly at the Dhaka racecourse in front of the people of Dhaka, and provided a guard of honour.

The war was a significant victory for India, with nearly ninety thousand Pakistani soldiers surrendering to the Indian Army despite only three thousand Indian soldiers in the immediate area of Dhaka.

A study of the campaign by Pakistan's National Defence College concluded that "the credit really goes to Jacob's meticulous preparations in the Indian eastern command and to the implementation by his corps commanders." According to the website Bharat Rakshak, Jacob had repeatedly asserted that the Bangladesh war was only successful because of his own efforts rather than those of Field Marshal Manekshaw or the GOC-in-C of Eastern Command, Lieutenant General Aurora.

For his role in the war, Jacob was awarded the Param Vishisht Seva Medal (PVSM) for distinguished service of the most exceptional order.

=== Later military career ===
On 17 June 1972, Jacob was promoted to the acting rank of lieutenant general and was appointed as the General Officer Commanding of XVI Corps (newly created), with promotion to substantive lieutenant-general on 5 August 1973. His final appointment was as GOC-in-C, Eastern Command, which he held from 1974 until 31 July 1978, when he retired from the Army following 36 years of service and having reached the mandatory retirement age.

== Post-retirement life and political career ==
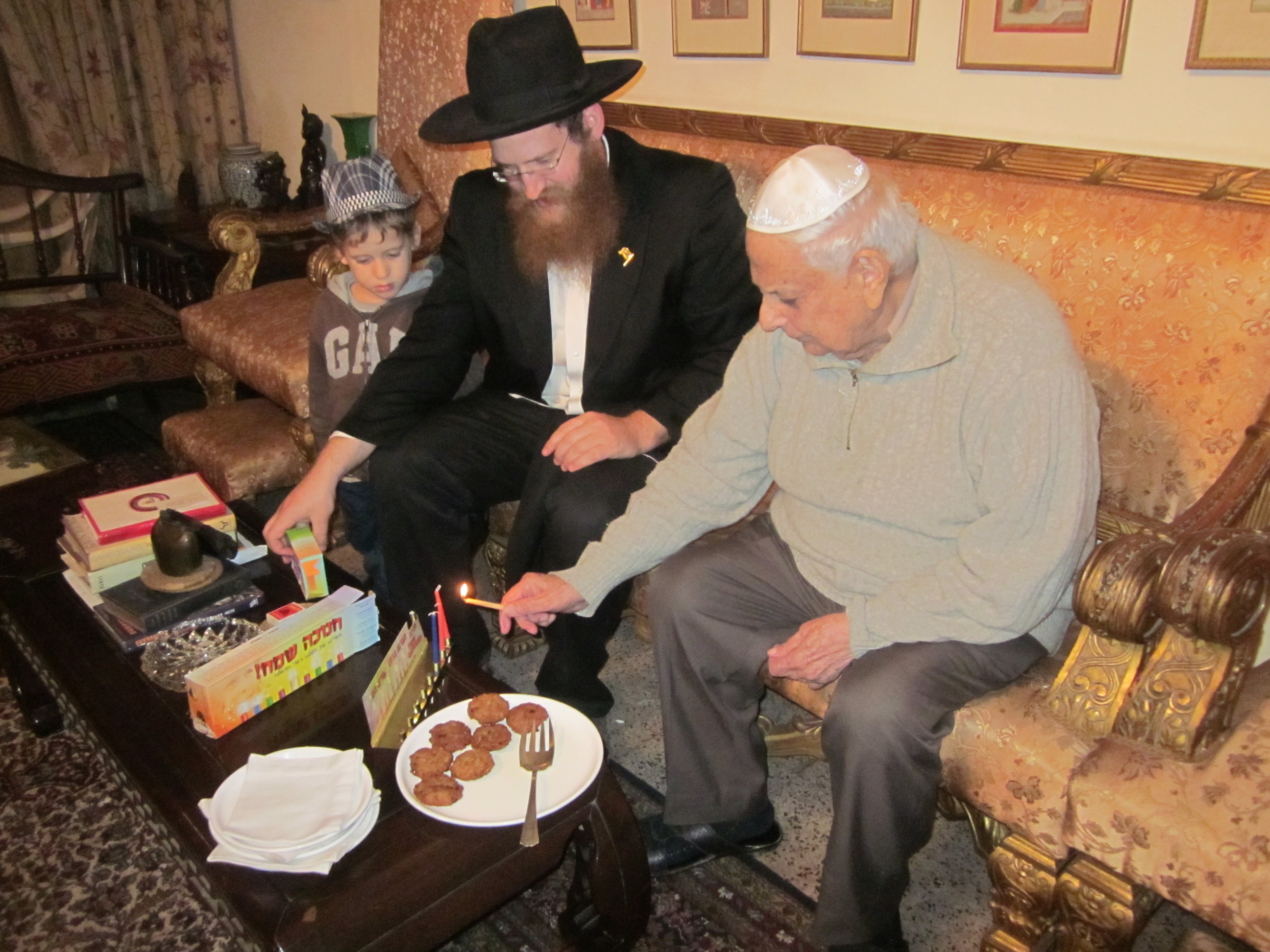
Jacob lighting Hanukkah candles, together with Rabbi Schneur Kuptz'ik, Chabad-Lubavitch emissary in Delhi (December 2012)

Following his retirement from the army, Jacob entered a career in business. In the late 1990s, he joined the Bharatiya Janata Party and served as its security adviser.

From 19 April 1998 till 26 November 1999, he served as the Governor of Goa. While Governor of Goa, he was also the administrator during president's rule, due to instability in the Goa assembly. As administrator, he was recognised as an efficient administrator. He contributed to the preservation of Goa's natural green cover by declaring Mhadei [209 km^{2} (80.7 sq mi)] and Netravati [211 km^{2} (81.5 sq mi)] as wildlife sanctuaries.

From 27 November 1999 till 8 May 2003, he served as the Governor of Punjab, and Administrator of Chandigarh. During this period, he successfully setup the IT Park in Chandigarh and invited N. R. Narayana Murthy, Chairman of Infosys, to set up a development center there. Thereafter, other IT companies also set up operations in the Chandigarh IT Park, thus increasing employment avenues in the city. He also conceptualised the Chandigarh War Memorial, which was designed by the students of the Chandigarh College of Architecture and inaugurated by President A. P. J. Abdul Kalam on 17 August 2006.

He was a supporter of improved India–Israel relations. When the Bharatiya Janata Party became part of the ruling coalition government of India in 1998, one of their first priorities was to improve relations with Israel, with which India has had formal diplomatic relations since 1992. In the run-up to 2004 election, he postulated the implications of a win for the Indian National Congress in terms of Indo–Israel relations as:

A victory by the Congress Party under the leadership of Sonia Gandhi...will not lead to any change in India's policy toward Israel. The good relations will continue, and in certain area even grow deeper. If I had to rank the present-day level of relations between India and Israel, I would give them a 9 out of 10.

He supported the purchase and trade of military equipment and technology from Israel by India, particularly the purchase of Israeli Arrow missiles, which he preferred over the U.S.-made Patriot missiles on account of the Arrows' ability to intercept enemy missiles at higher altitudes.

He remained cautious about relations between India and Pakistan in light of the Pakistani media's suggesting that military and intelligence co-operation between Israel and India, which they called a "Zionist threat" on Pakistan's borders.

India has been attacked several times by Pakistan. We cannot take risks, and be unprepared for a surprise attack. India should be prepared for both Pakistan and China. Therefore, there is a need for anti-missile missiles. Due to the Pakistani danger and the threat of launch of missiles with nuclear warheads.

He was also positive about India's recent economic growth and the capabilities of the young Indian generation. He said:

As a country, we are at the threshold of an economic explosion and, hence, at this moment, empowerment means most to those who hold the key to the future. I talk of the younger generation. Sound economic and strategic planning will bring about this change. Unfortunately, since our prosperity comes in bursts, good governance, in the form of dedicated politicians and bureaucrats, is essential to usher any changes.

== Death ==
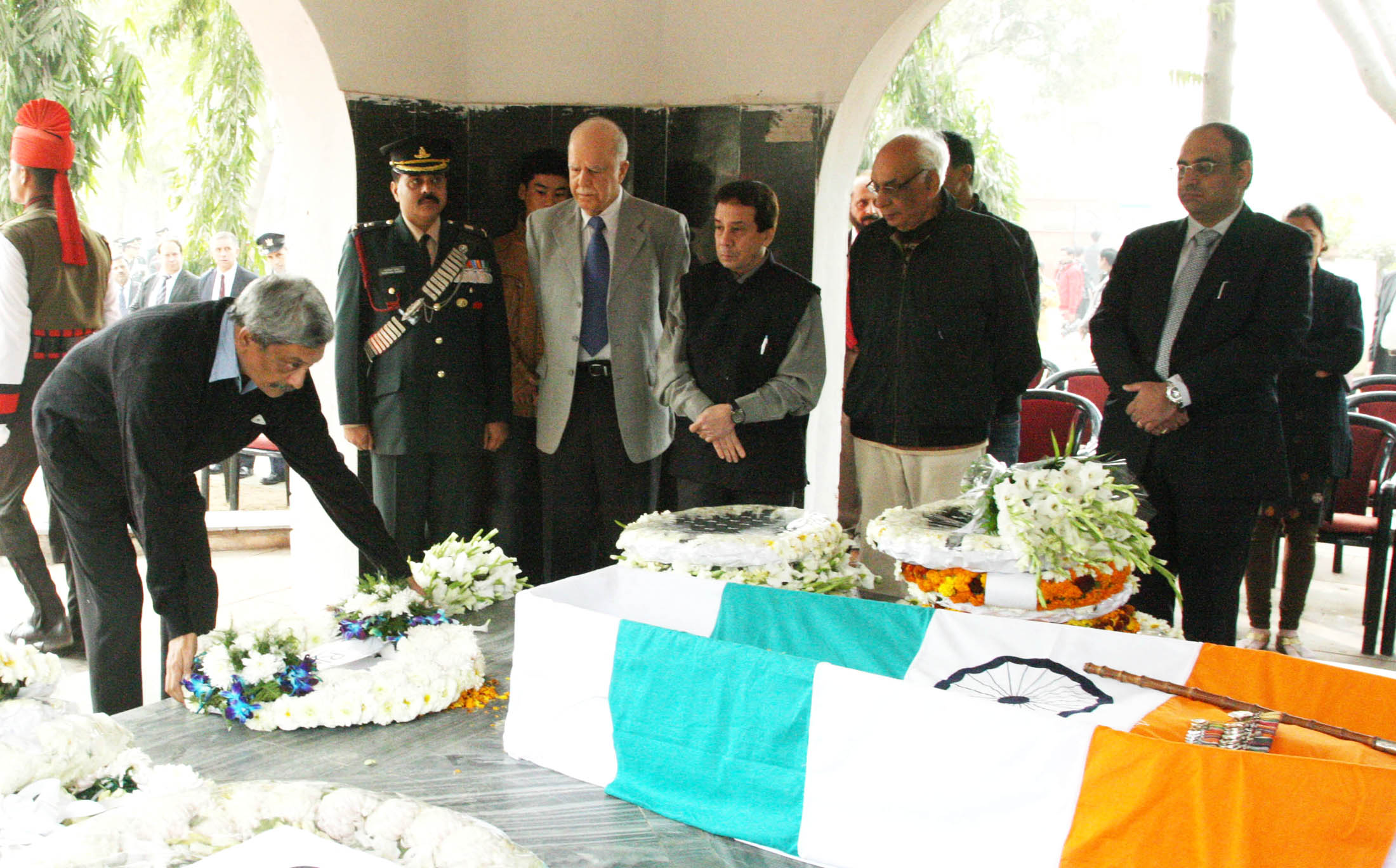
Defence Minister Manohar Parrikar lays a wreath at Lt. Gen. Jacob's grave in New Delhi on 14 January 2016.

On 13 January 2016, at around 8.30 am local time, Jacob died at New Delhi's Army Research and Referral Hospital due to pneumonia. He was laid to rest the following day in Delhi's Jewish cemetery on Humayun Road. His funeral was attended by India's defence minister, information minister, and foreign delegations.

In April 2019, Israel honoured Jacob with a commemorative plaque on the Ammunition Hill Wall of Honour.

== Major publications ==
Jacob was the author of these books:

- Surrender at Dacca: Birth of a Nation (ISBN 984-05-1395-8)
- An Odyssey in War and Peace: An Autobiography (ISBN 978-81-7436-840-9)

== Honours and awards ==

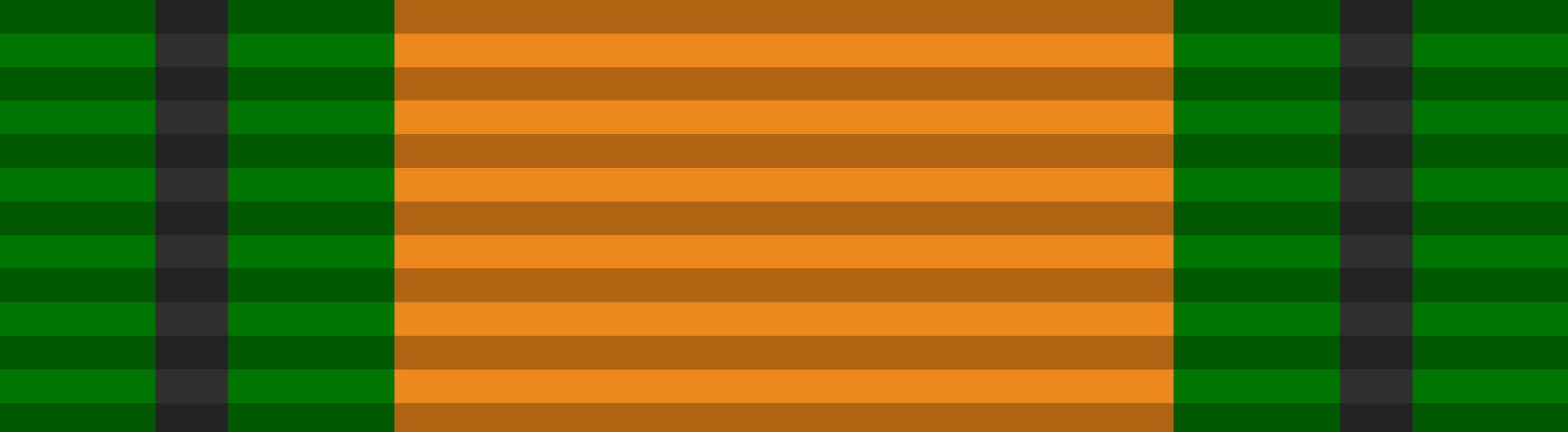

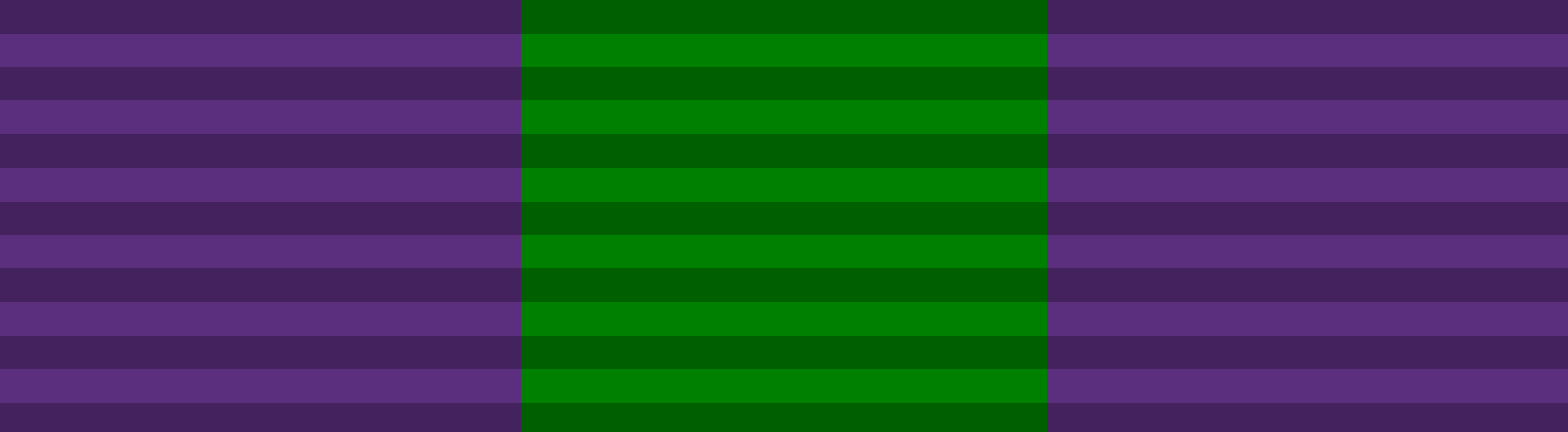

Param Vishisht Seva Medal	Poorvi Star		Paschimi Star
Raksha Medal	Sangram Medal	Sainya Seva Medal	Indian Independence Medal
25th Anniversary of Independence Medal	20 Years Long Service Medal	9 Years Long Service Medal	1939–1945 Star
Burma Star	Defence Medal	War Medal 1939–1945	General Service Medal (1918)

The Bangladesh government, in 2012, in recognition of his contribution to the creation of Bangladesh, conferred him with the Friends of Liberation War Honour.

== Dates of rank ==
Insignia	Rank	Component	Date of rank
	Second Lieutenant	British Indian Army	7 June 1942 (emergency); 7 December 1943 (substantive)
	Lieutenant	British Indian Army	7 December 1942 (war-substantive); 27 October 1945 (substantive; regular commission)
	Captain	British Indian Army	2 February 1945 (acting); 2 May 1945 (temporary); 20 July 1946 (war-substantive)
	Major	British Indian Army	20 April 1946 (acting); 20 July 1946 (temporary)
	Lieutenant	Indian Army	15 August 1947 (Note: Upon independence in 1947, India became a Dominion within the British Commonwealth of Nations. As a result, the rank insignia of the British Army, incorporating the Tudor Crown and four-pointed Bath Star ("pip"), was retained, as George VI remained Commander-in-Chief of the Indian Armed Forces. After 26 January 1950, when India became a republic, the President of India became Commander-in-Chief, and the Ashoka Lion replaced the crown, with a five-pointed star being substituted for the "pip.")
	Captain	Indian Army	1948
	Captain	Indian Army	26 January 1950 (recommissioning and change in insignia)
	Major	Indian Army	7 June 1955
	Lieutenant-Colonel	Indian Army	7 June 1958
	Colonel	Indian Army	23 December 1964
	Brigadier	Indian Army	20 May 1964 (acting); 17 January 1966 (substantive)
	Major General	Indian Army	2 October 1967 (acting); 10 June 1968 (substantive)
	Lieutenant-General	Indian Army	17 June 1972 (acting); 5 August 1973 (substantive)

== In popular culture ==
The short film 'Mukti – Birth of a Nation', starring Milind Soman as Gen. Jacob and Yashpal Sharma as Gen. A. A. K. Niazi covers the negotiations between Gen. Jacob and Gen. Niazi on 16 December 1971, resulting in the unconditional surrender of Pakistani forces in Bangladesh.

== Notes ==
Military offices
Preceded by N. C. Rawlley	General Officer Commanding-in-Chief Eastern Command; 1974–1978	Succeeded by E A Vas
Political offices
Preceded by B. K. N. Chibber	Governor of Punjab; 1999–2003	Succeeded by O. P. Verma
Preceded by T. R. Satish Chandran	Governor of Goa; 1998–1999	Succeeded by Mohammed Fazal
