= Lady Dufferin Hospital =

Hospital in Karachi, Pakistan

Lady Dufferin Hospital, Karachi
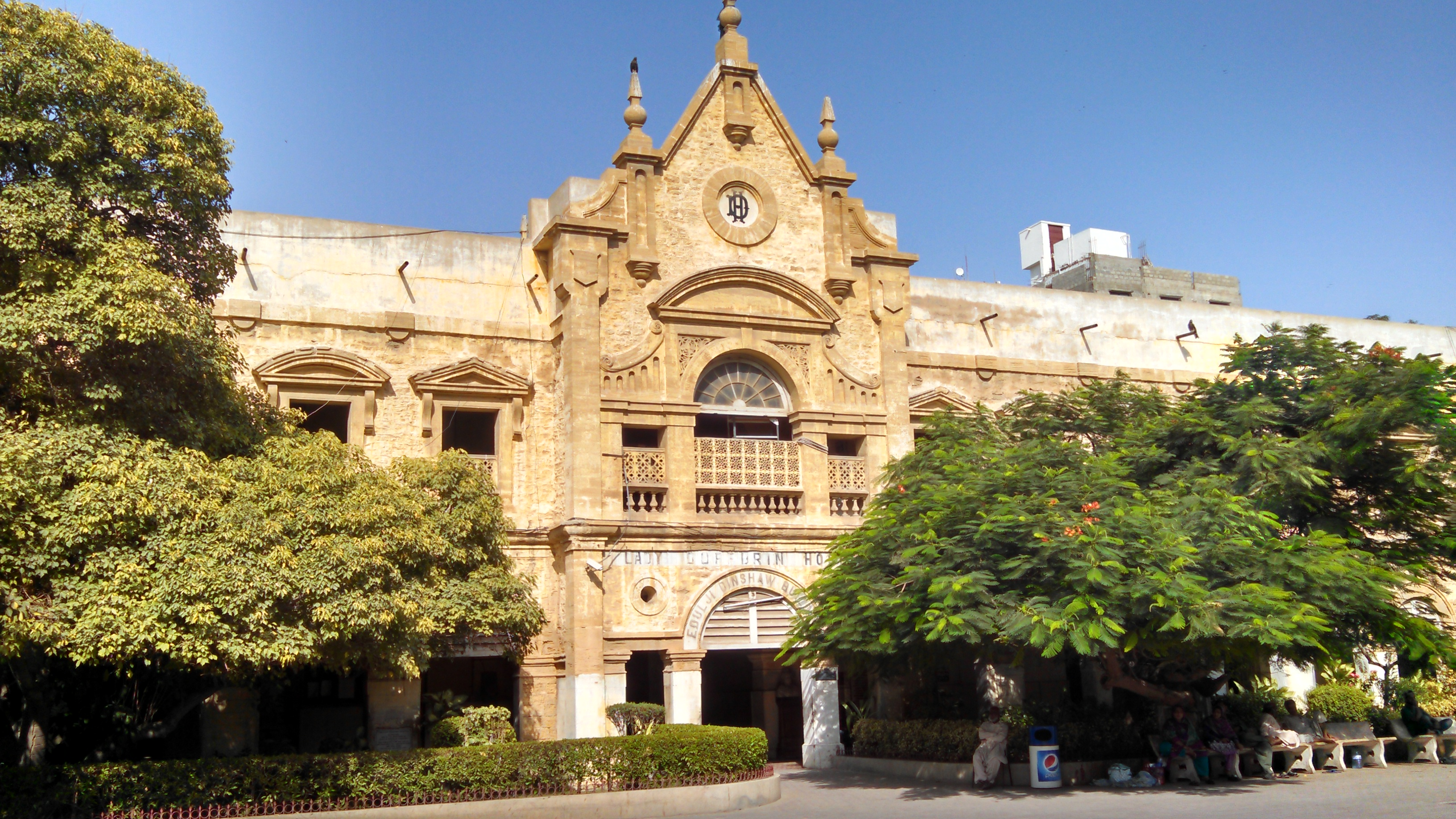
- Katrak Maternity Ward

Geography
- Location: Karachi, Sindh, Pakistan
- Coordinates: 24°51′30″N 67°00′28″E

Organisation
- Care system: Private
- Type: District General, Speicalist
- Patron: Lady Elgin and Kincardine

Services
- Emergency department: No
- Beds: 300

History
- Opened: 1898

Links
- Website: www.ladydufferinhospital.org
- Lists: Hospitals in Pakistan

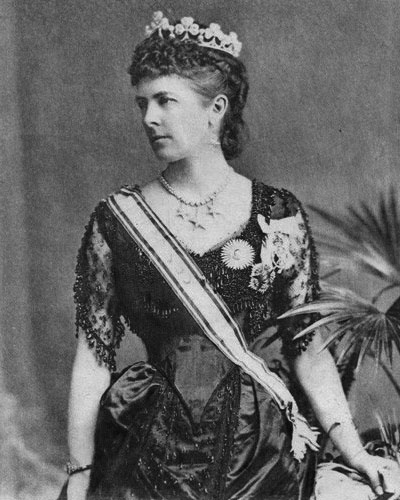
Lady Dufferin established a fund to provide medical aid to oppressed women in the British Raj.

Lady Dufferin Hospital is a private women's hospital located in Karachi, Sindh, Pakistan. It is one of the major maternity hospitals in Karachi, Pakistan.

== Donations ==
Seth Edulji Dinshaw contributed a sum of Rs. 50,000/- for its establishment in 1898, which may be equal to $2 million – $3 million today.

"In the end, compared to the total donation by the committee and the province, amounting to a mere Rs.15,000, the Dinshaws donated Rs. 85,000 ... In 1894, Edulji Dinshaw donated Rs. 50,000 to the fund, making the initiation [of the hospital] possible".

The city of Karachi owes many thanks to Seth Edulji Dinshaw (1842 – 1914) and his son Nadirshaw Edulji Dinshaw (1862 – 1922) for their tremendous help in building many hospitals, educational institutes and residential areas of Karachi.

== Foundation laying ceremony ==
The foundation laying ceremony was performed on 12 November 1894 by Lady Elgin.

In 1915, Dr. Elizabeth Stephens Imprey was appointed the new head of the hospital, but she never made it to Karachi from England. She boarded the P & O liner SS Persia as a first-class passenger in Tilbury, London. The ship was sunk off Crete's coast by a German submarine on 30 December 1915. More than 340 passengers drowned, including Dr. Imprey.

== Features ==
Initially, a ward in this hospital was kept specifically for Parsis. In January 1917, the Virbaijee Maternity Wing was opened.

Benazir Bhutto, the former Prime Minister of Pakistan, gave birth to a son Bilawal Bhutto Zardari in the hospital in 1988.

== History ==
Prior to the departure of Lady Dufferin from Britain in 1884 with her appointment as Vicereine of India, she was asked by Queen Victoria to investigate the possibilities of providing medical relief to Indian women, whose suffering the Queen was reported to be deeply concerned by. Lady Dufferin concluded that "taking India as a whole, its women were undoubtedly without that medical aid which their European sisters are accustomed to consider as absolutely necessary," with there being an "urgent need" for relief and "readiness for co-operation." She subsequently established her fund, also known as the National Association for supplying Female Medical Aid to the Women of India, to provide such aid. Her fund, or association, trained women medical staff to tend to women not permitted to see male doctors.

These Dufferin Hospitals were located in Karachi, Quetta, Shikarpur & Hyderabad (now in Pakistan) and Delhi, Nagpor and Calcutta (in independent India) as well as one in the Burmese capital Rangoon.

She appealed to the local philanthropists to donate to the "Dufferin Fund" in order to build these hospitals. In response to this appeal Mr. Eduljee Dinshaw, a renowned philanthropist, established the Lady Dufferin Hospital, Karachi, by a princely donation, in 1894 as a Charitable Institute. The foundation laying ceremony of Eduljee Dinshaw Wing was performed on 12 November 1894 by Lady Elgin with Kincardine and hospital completed in 1898.

=== Katrak Maternity Wing ===
The Foundation Stone was laid in August 1914 and the building was completed in June 1915. The Opening ceremony took place on 6 January 1916. Total Cost: Rs. 70,000/- Engineer in Charge: S.G. Lyttle, P.W.D Physician in Charge: MVS. Leonard (Gumprich, M.B. ch B) Architect: Durcdas B. Advani Contractor: Sewji Ganesh Honorary: F.S. Punnett Secretaries: E. A. Pearson Katrak Maternity Wing (As stand today).

Renovation works commenced on 27 February 1999. The Ground breaking ceremony was performed by Moinuddin Haider, former Governor of Sindh. The work was completed in December 2005.

Dr. Catherine Arnott was the first medical officer in charge of the hospital. In 1915, Dr. Elizabeth Stephens Imprey was appointed the new head of the hospital, but she never made it to Karachi from England. She boarded the P & O liner SS Persia as a first-class passenger in Tilbury, London. The ship was sunk off Crete coast by a German submarine on 30 December 1915. More than 340 passengers drowned, including Dr. Imprey.

== Current status ==
Today, the Lady Dufferin Hospital has a capacity of 300 beds with 4 operation theatres, prenatal and postnatal wards, ultrasound department, neo-natal intensive care unit, labor room, consulting rooms, private and semi-private rooms, outpatient department (OPD), family planning services and 24-hour laboratory, radiology and pharmacy. The hospital is one of the largest reputable maternity hospitals in Pakistan. It has state-of-the-art equipment enabling it to provide comprehensive obstetric, gynecological, and neonatal healthcare.

This includes deliveries, advanced hysteroscopy/laparoscopic surgery, cancer surgery, and infertility (including IVF as a satellite unit). The Neo-natal Intensive Care Unit at the Lady Dufferin Hospital provides critical care at highly subsidized rates. We have recently added another new high-tech ventilator and a bubble CPAP unit, and provide free ventilator support for neonates.

== Cowasjee School of Midwifery ==
The school is a continuation of the Phyllis Louise Lawrence Institute, which was established in 1912 with the generous donation of Nadirshaw Eduljee Dinshaw, the son of Eduljee Dinshaw, the original benefactor of the Lady Dufferin.

The distinguishing feature of the Lady Dufferin is the quality of care provided to the patients irrespective of their financial status.

=== Nursing Training ===
In the beginning, the hospital was started for women and children. In order to fulfill its needs for Nursing Services, the School of Nursing for General and Midwifery was started in 1912. General Nursing was discontinued in 1964 and the entire focus was shifted to midwifery training.

It was among the first midwifery schools recognized by the Central Board of Midwives of the U.K. Since 1994, the School of midwifery has maintained approx. 98% success rate in the qualifying Examination Board (SNEB). In 1994, a student obtained the First Position with honors in the whole province of Sindh as well as all across Pakistan.

During the training period, the students are provided free accommodation, food, and health coverage. After the completion of training, it is mandatory to give one year of service to the hospital.

Since its inception, the school was shifted from one building to another within the premises of the hospital. In view of this, the hospital administration decided to build a School of Midwifery including hostel facilities.

Ardeshir Cowasjee who created Cowasjee Foundation, built a proper school of Midwifery including the hostel which was completed in 2011. The opening ceremony of the school was held on 25 February 2012.

== Future plans ==
Isardas Asonmal Dispensary Building This stone structure was built in 1911 and renovated with the help of the Sindh Flood Relief Fund at a cost RS 7,000 in 1933. It housed the Out-Patient and Ultrasound Departments for decades until 2009 when the OPD was shifted due to space constraints and the dilapidated state of the building.
