= Frere Hall =

British colonial-era building in Karachi, Pakistan

- فریئر ہال
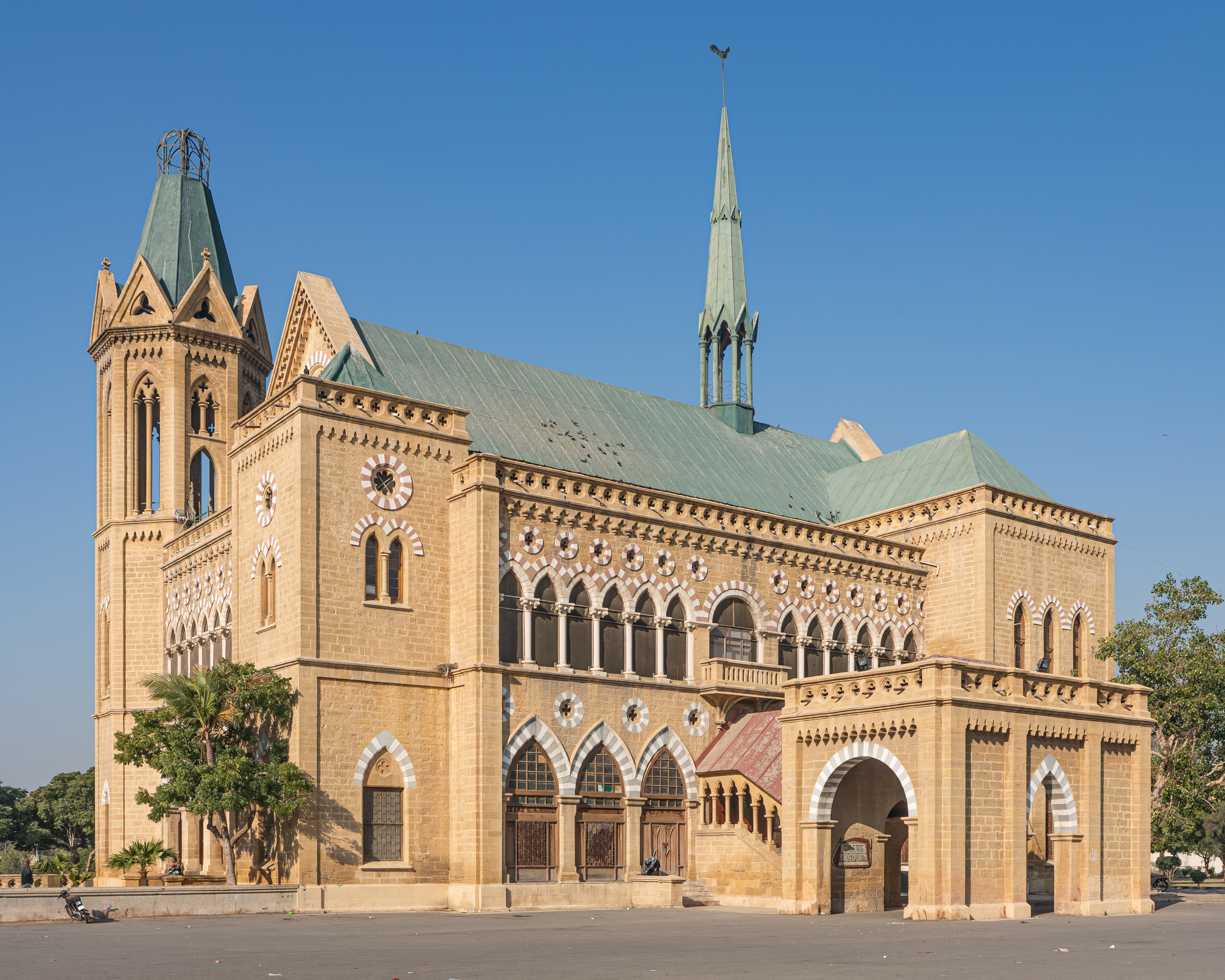
- Front view of the Frere Hall in Karachi

General information
- Type: Built originally as a town hall and library, currently used as an exhibition hall, event space, and library
- Location: Civil Lines; Karachi-75530; Pakistan
- Coordinates: 24°50′51″N 67°01′58″E
- Construction started: August 1863
- Completed: 10 October 1865

Design and construction
- Architect: Henry Saint Clair Wilkins

Frere Hall (Urdu: فریئر ہال) is a building in Karachi, Pakistan that dates from the early British colonial era in Sindh. Completed in 1865, Frere Hall was originally intended to serve as Karachi's town hall, and now serves as an exhibition space and library.

== Location ==
Frere Hall is located in central Karachi's colonial-era Saddar Town, in the Civil Lines neighborhood that is home to several consulates. The hall is located between Abdullah Haroon Road (formerly Victoria Road) and Fatima Jinnah Road (formerly Bonus Road). It lies adjacent to the colonial-era Sind Club.

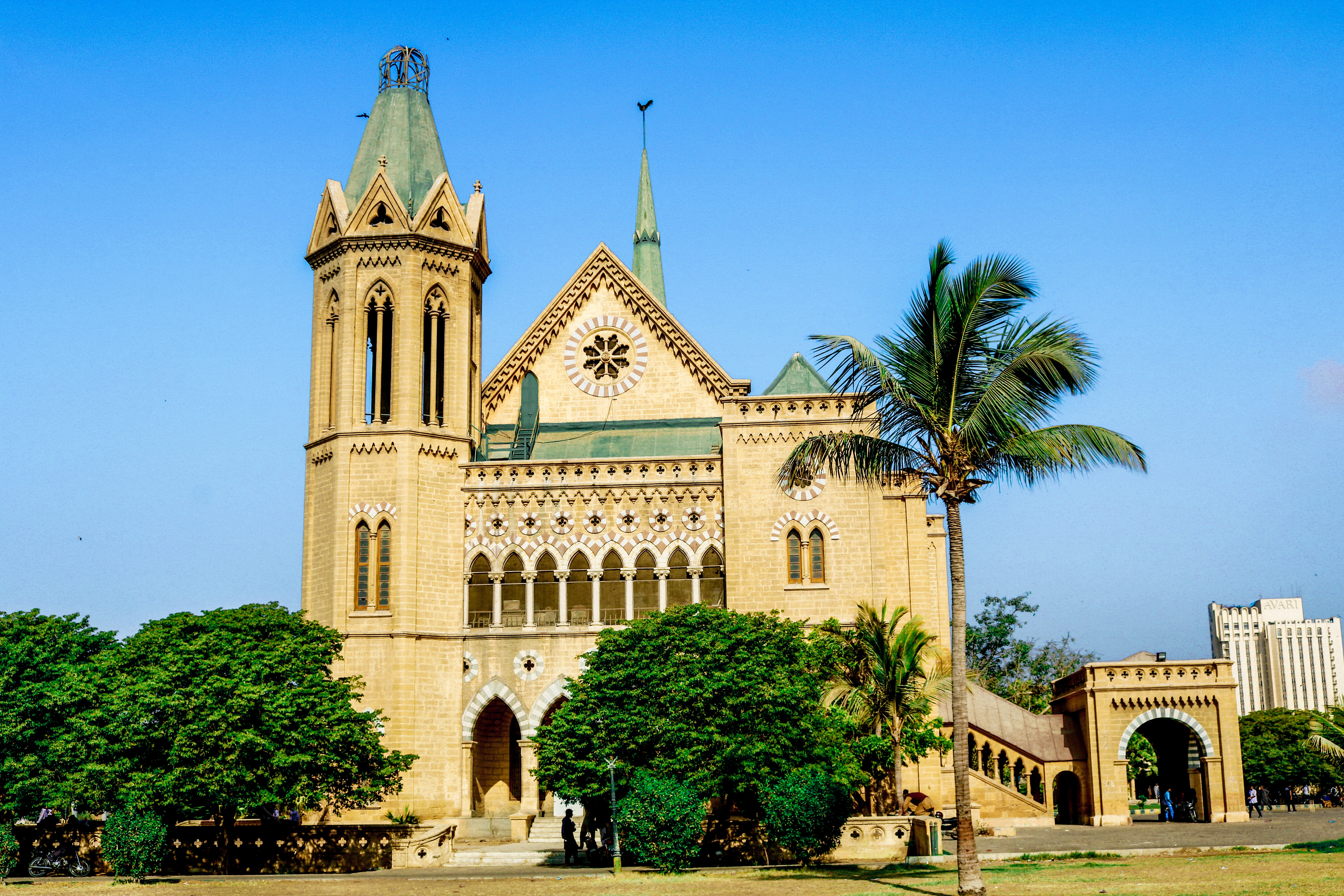
Frere Hall, garden side - one of the elegant landmarks of Karachi

== History ==
The building was intended to serve as Karachi's town hall, and was designed by Henry Saint Clair Wilkins, who was chosen from among 12 candidates.

The building's land was purchased at a cost of 2,000 British Indian rupees, which had been donated by WP Andrew of the Scinde Railway, and Sir Frederick Arthur Bartholomew. The total cost of the hall was approximately 180,000 rupees, of which the government contributed 10,000 rupees, and the remainder was paid by the Karachi municipality.

Work commenced in August 1863 and continued until October 1865; construction had not been entirely completed by the time of its inauguration.

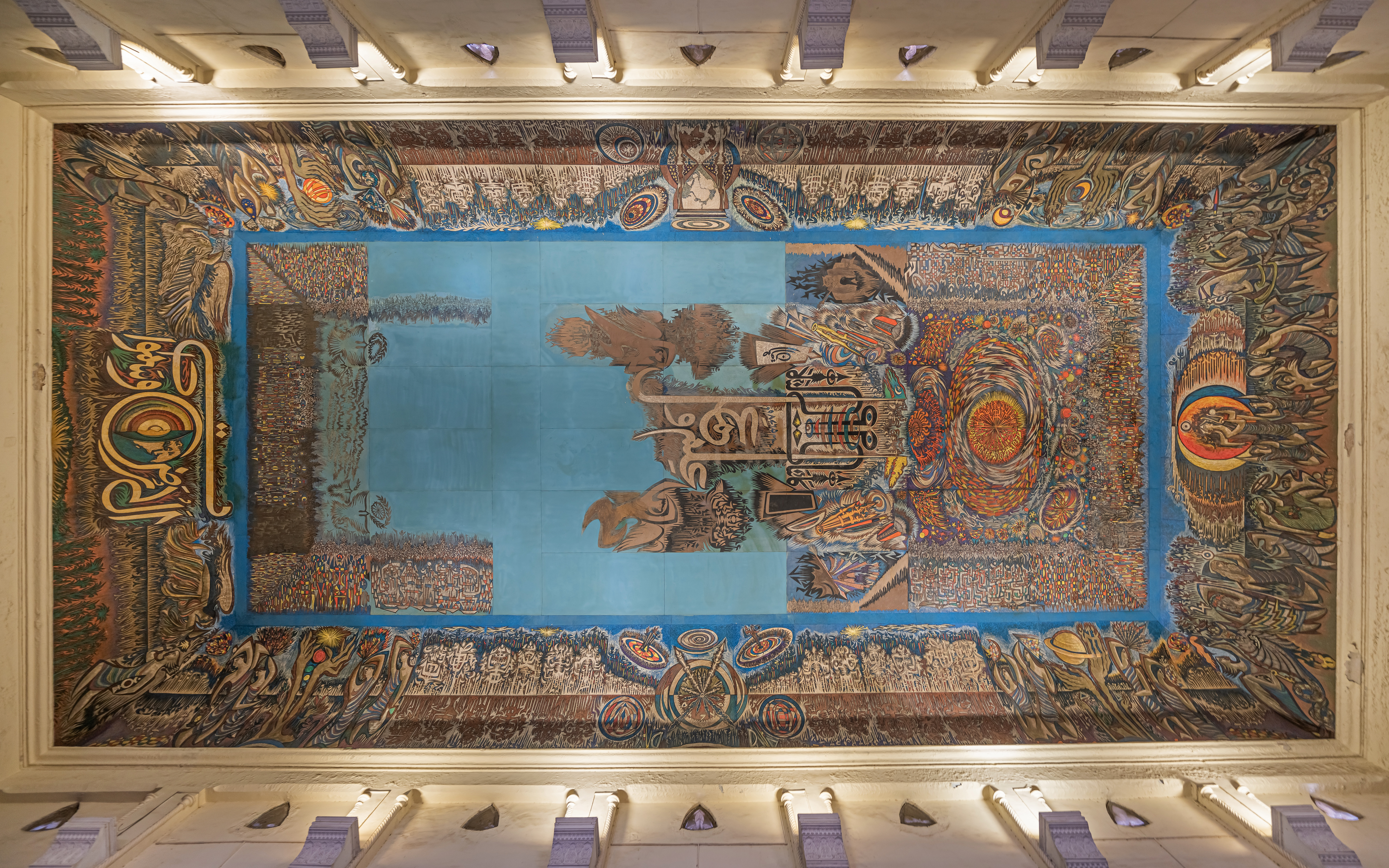
The ceiling of Frere Hall features unfinished mural paintings by Sadequain

In 1877 at Frere Hall, the first attempt was made to form a consistent set of rules of badminton. Following the death of Sir Henry Bartle Edward Frere in 1884, the building was renamed in his honour. Frere was a British administrator who was known for promoting economic development in Sindh, as well as for making the Sindhi language the language of administration in Sindh, rather than the Persian language, which had been favoured by the Mughals.

Following the independence of Pakistan, the hall's library was renamed as Liaquat National Library. The library is one of Karachi's largest, and houses a collection of more than 70,000 books, including rare and hand-written manuscripts.

The hall's ceilings were decorated by the world-renowned Pakistani artist Sadequain in the 1980s, with one mural remaining incomplete after his death in 1987. Several other works by Sadequain are found in the hall, and form what is known as the "Galerie Sadequain".

The hall was closed periodically between 2002 and 2011 due to numerous attempted terrorist attacks on the nearby US consulate, and was not reopened permanently until 2011 when the consulate was relocated to a site further away. It is now directly administered by the Karachi Municipal Corporation, and hosts several festivals.

== Architecture ==
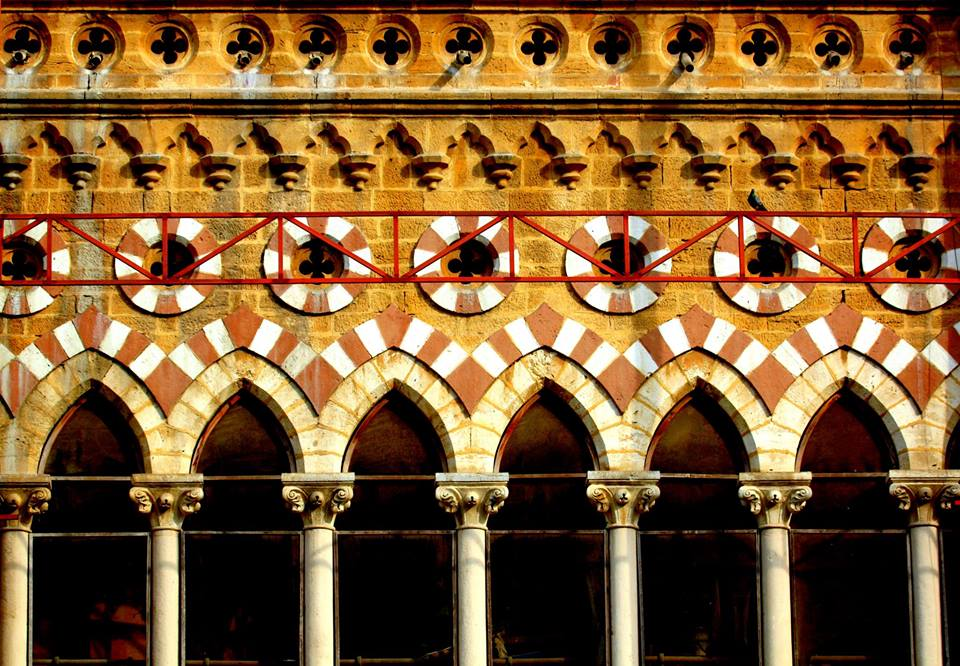
The exteriors feature Gothic-style quatrefoils above Venetian style arches.

Frere Hall was built in the Venetian-Gothic style that also blends elements of British and local architecture. The building features multiple pointed arches, ribbed vaults, quatrefoils, and flying buttresses. Carving on the walls and beautifully articulated mosaic designs are visible on multiple walls and pillars.

The building is built primarily out of local yellow-toned limestone, with stone details formed from white oolite stone quarried from the nearby town of Bholari. Red and grey sandstone is also used in the building, which was quarried from the Sindhi town of Jungshahi.

A tall octagonal tower is located in one of the building's corner that is crowned by an iron cage. The roof of the hall is coated with Muntz metal.

The hall is surrounded by two lawns originally known as "Queen's Lawn" and "King's Lawn" which after independence were renamed as Bagh-e-Jinnah, or "Jinnah Gardens".

== Exhibition space ==
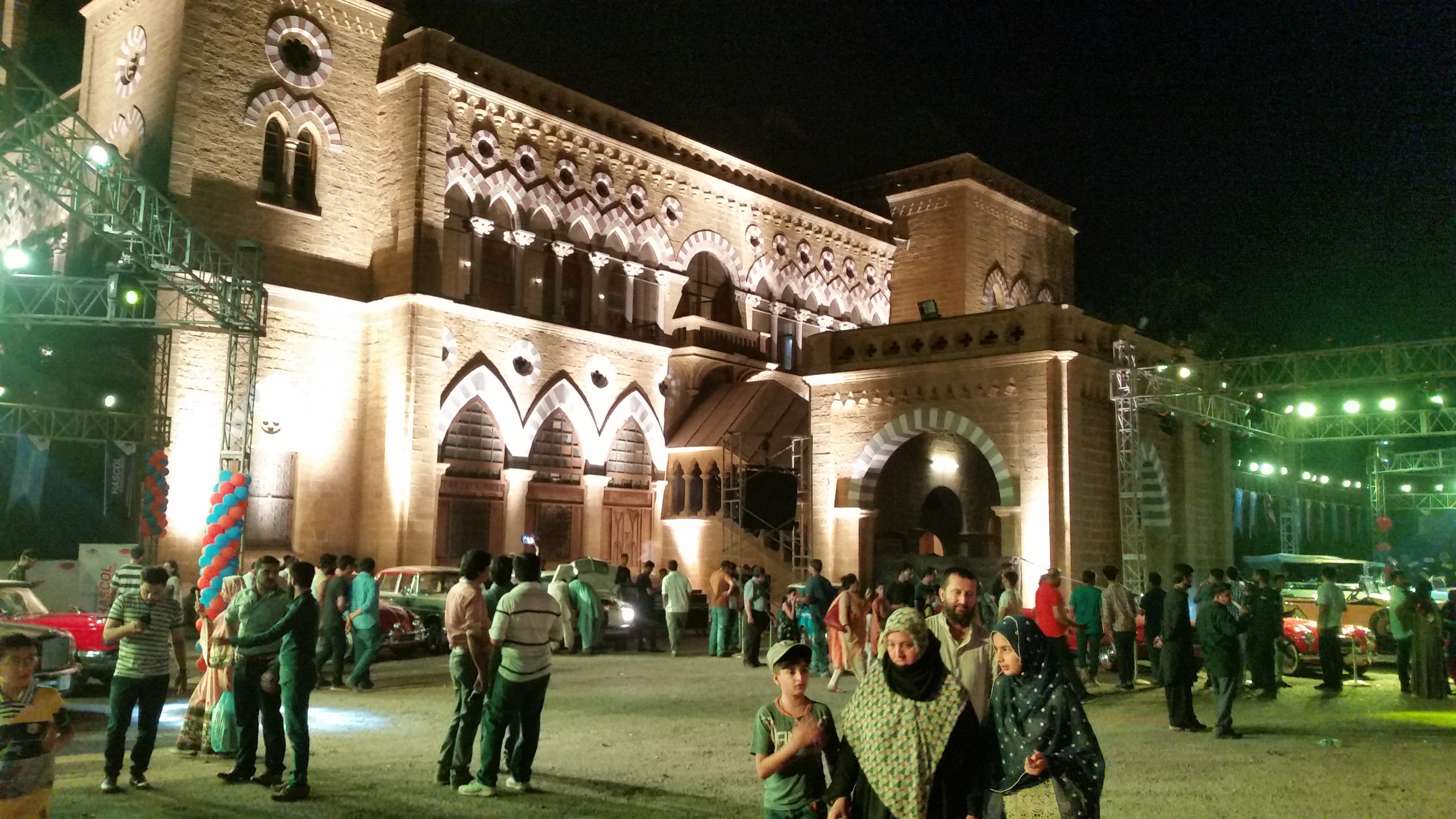
Frere Hall is now used for festivals.

Frere Hall houses a number of stone busts, including that of King Edward VII, which was a gift from local Parsi philanthropist Seth Edulji Dinshaw. Frere Hall also houses oil paintings by Sir Charles Pritchard, who was a former Commissioner of Sindh.

As of 2022, Frere Hall was open to the public, and it is also one of the most important tourist attractions in Karachi because of the building's notable architecture and its association with British rule in the Subcontinent.

== Gallery ==
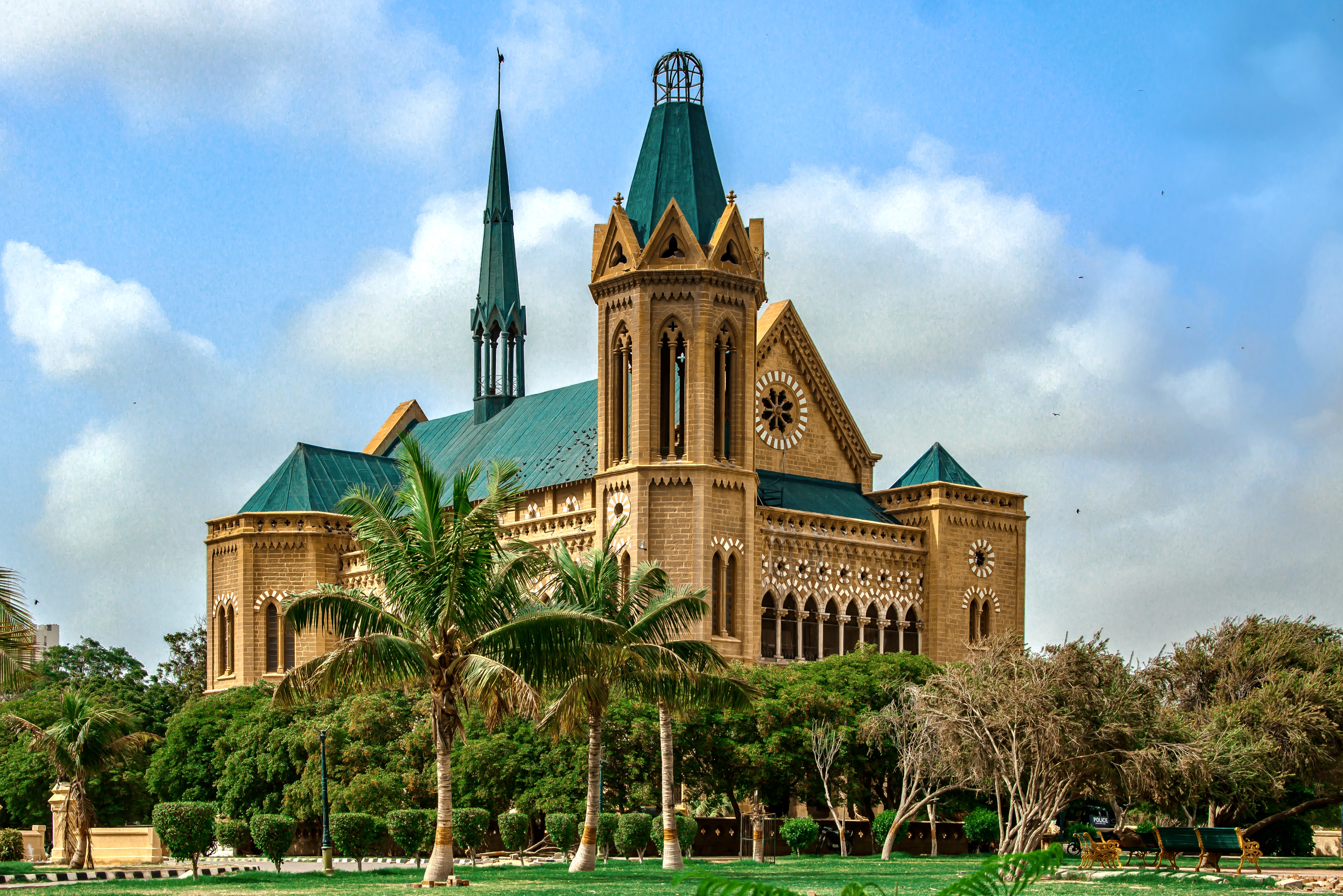
Frere Hall is surrounded by gardens

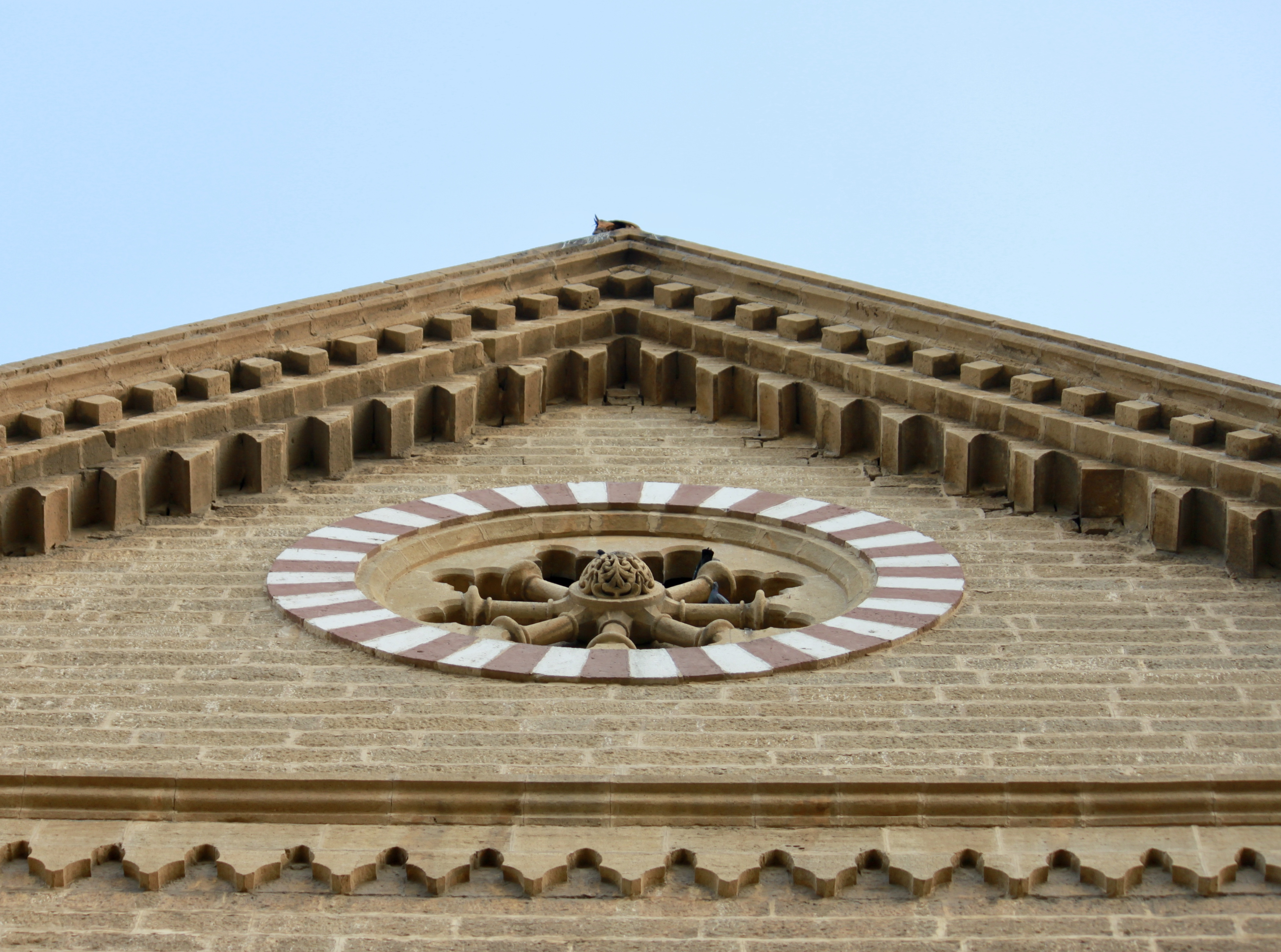
Architectural details of Frere Hall

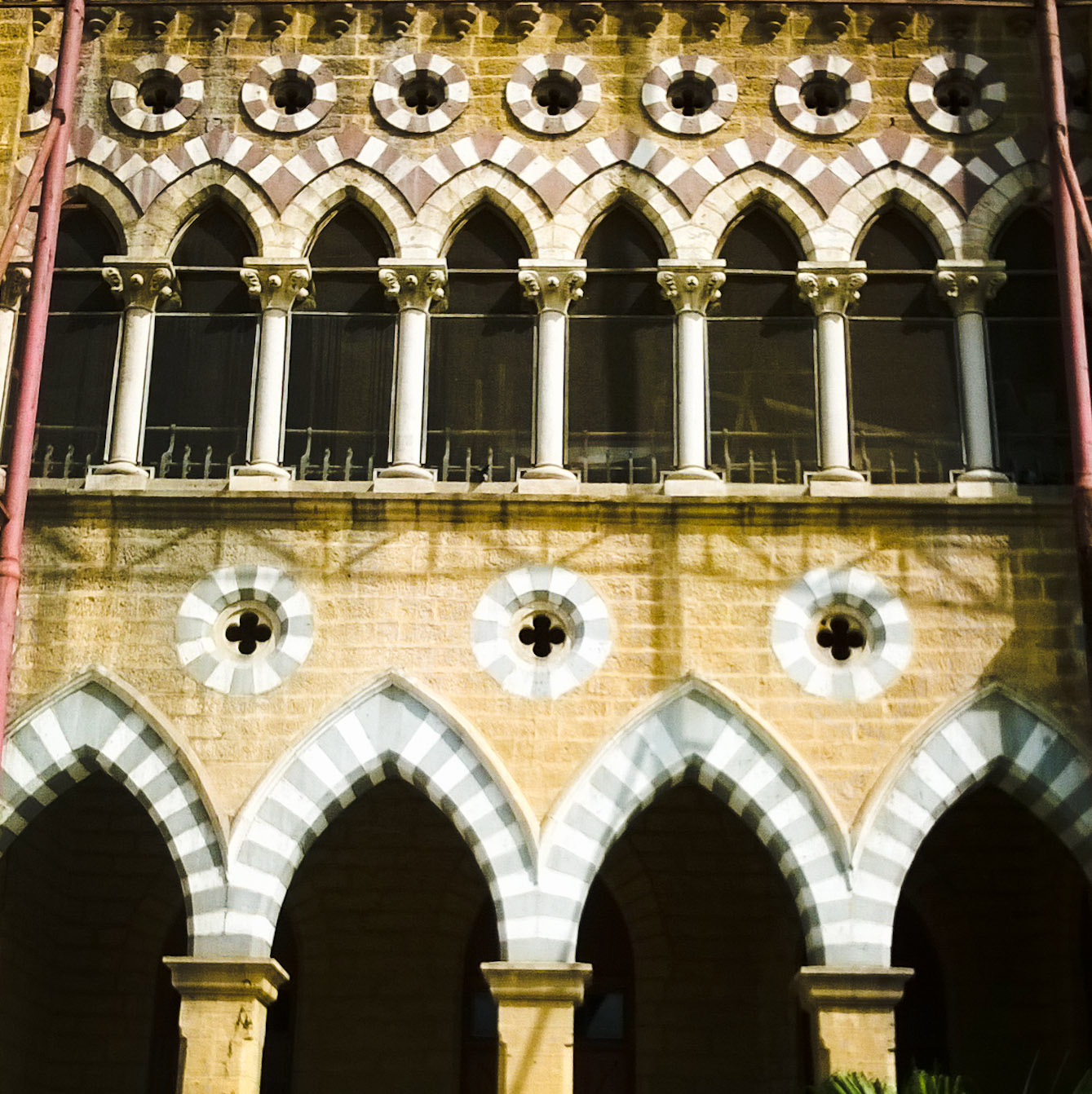
Frere Hall features Venetian-Gothic architectural elements

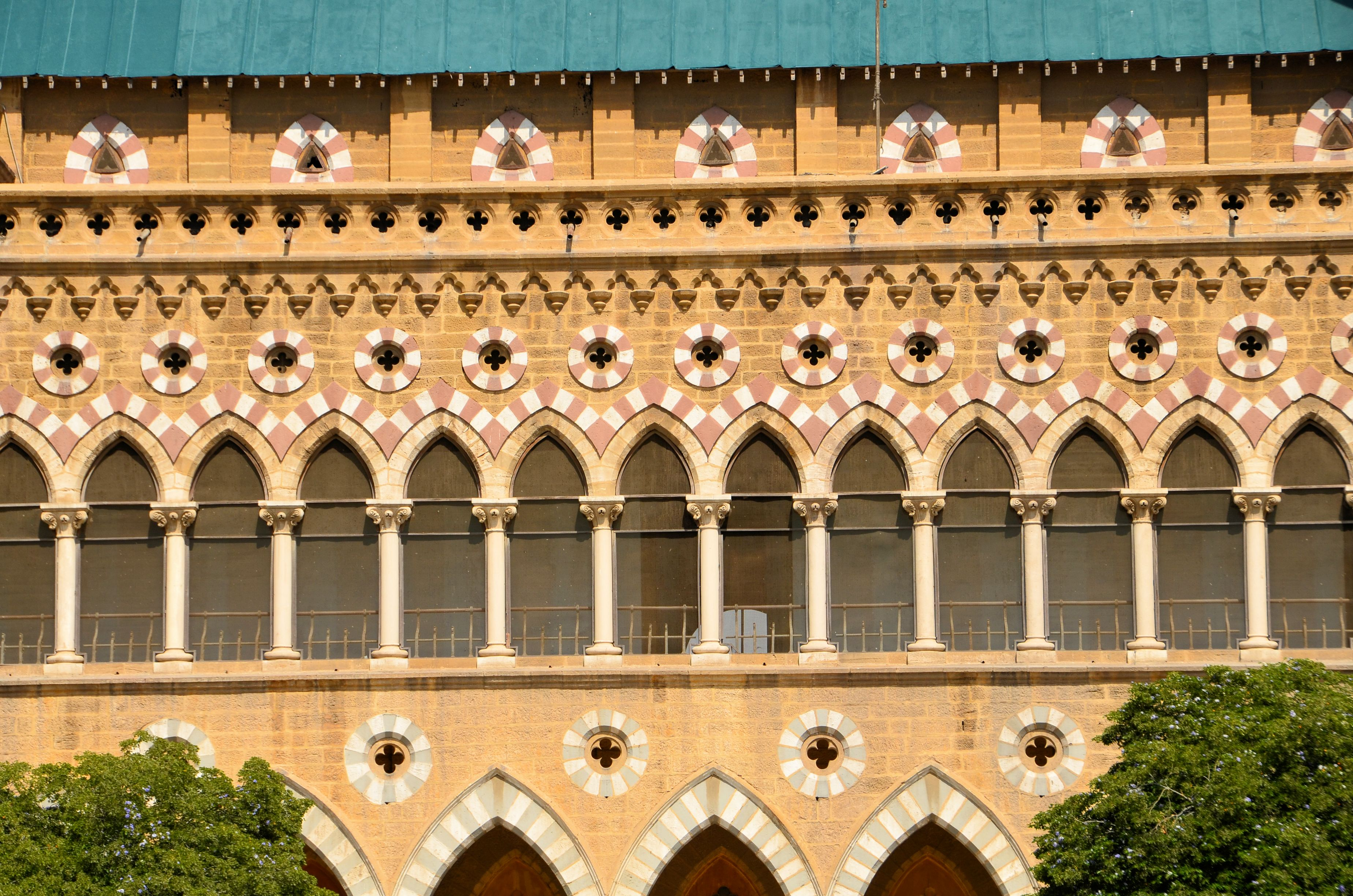
The hall's balconies feature Venetian-Gothic motifs

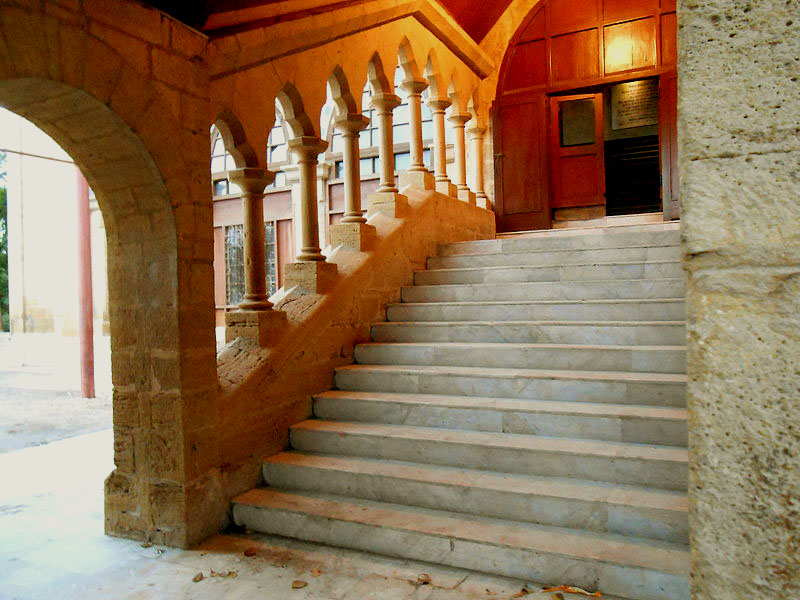
Staircases at the building are made of stone

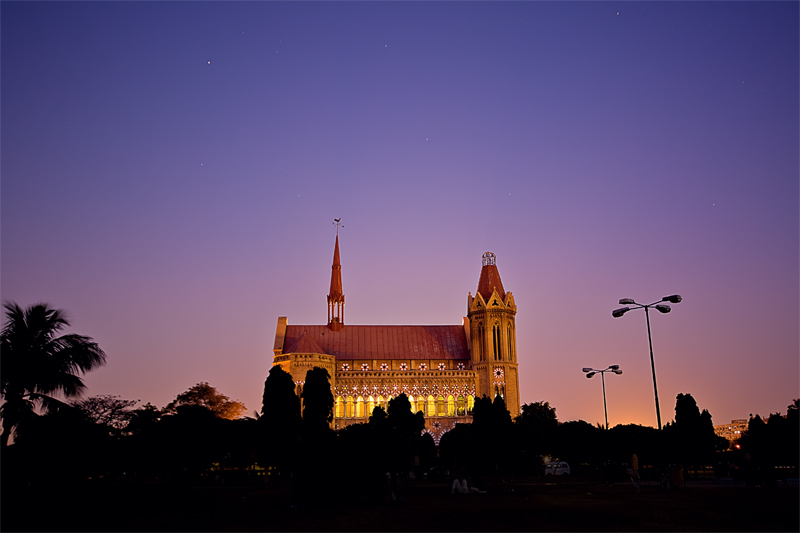
Frere Hall at sunset.

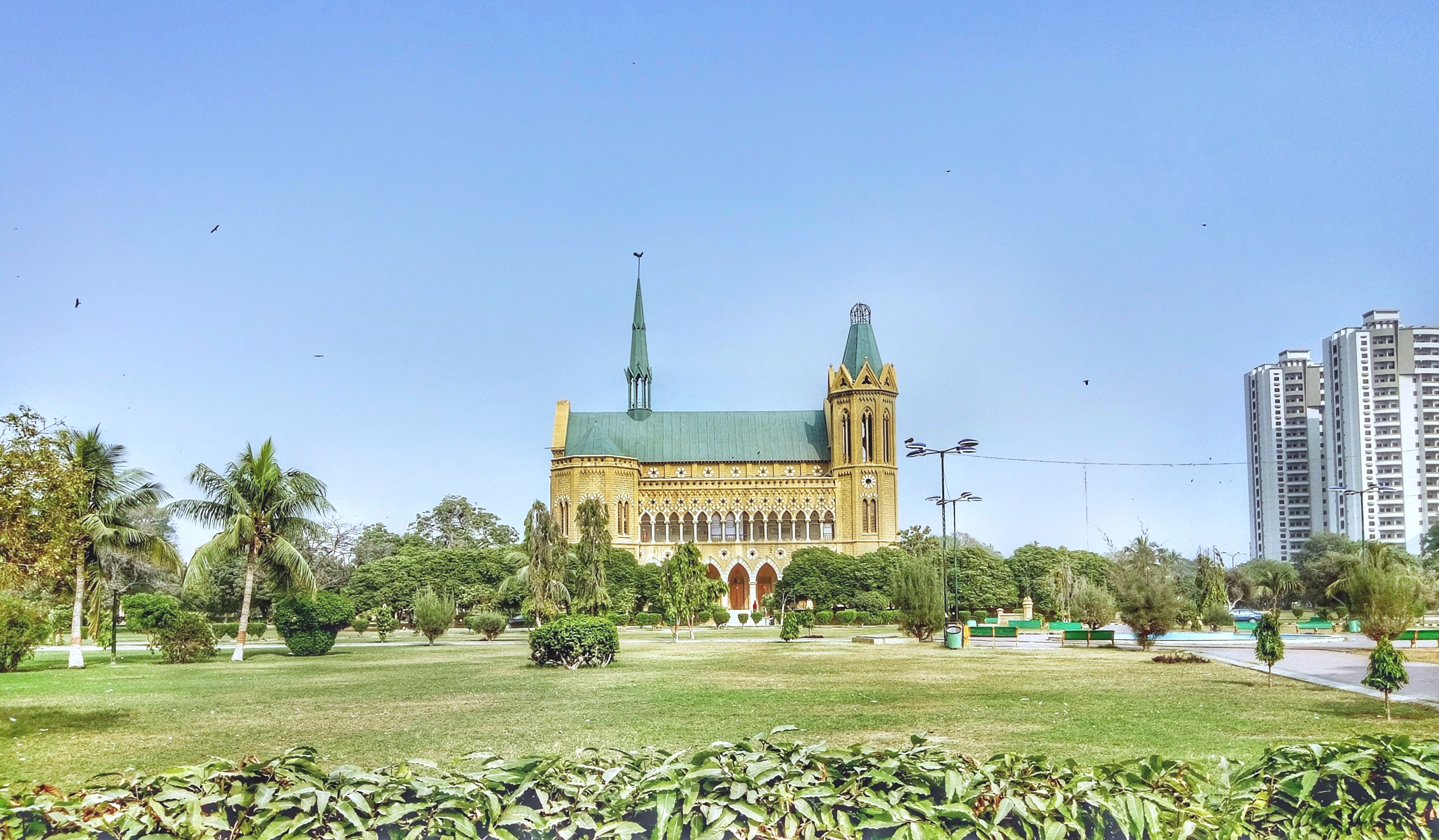
Frere Hall Karachi.View from west side of Garden

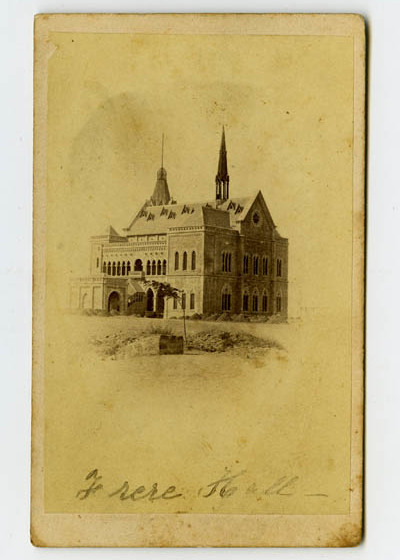
Frere Hall, Karachi, 1860s

== See also ==
- List of cultural heritage sites in Sindh
