= Dinshaw Eduljee =

Indian Air Force officer

Flying Officer Dinshaw Ferozeshaw Eduljee AFC
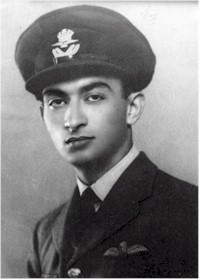
- Dinshaw Ferozeshaw Eduljee
- Born: 30 June 1919; Lucknow, British India
- Died: 27 November 1944 (aged 25); Sizwe, Burma
- Military career
- Allegiance: British India
- Branch: Royal Indian Air Force
- Service years: 1941-1944
- Rank: Flying Officer
- Unit: No.1 Squadron
- Conflicts: World War II; Battle of Imphal; Battle of Kohima
- Awards: Air Force Cross

Flying Officer Dinshaw Ferozeshaw Eduljee, AFC (30 June 1919 – 27 November 1944) was a former officer of the Indian Air Force (IAF). He was the first pilot of the IAF to receive the Air Force Cross, on 1 June 1944. Eduljee is presumed to have died after the Hurricane fighter aircraft he was flying crashed in action behind Japanese lines in Burma (today's Myanmar). The circumstances and time of his death are not known.

== Early life and education ==
Eduljee was born to Ferozeshaw and Khursheed Eduljee on 30 June 1919 in Lucknow, India. According to his brother Major (Retd.) Erauch (Eddie) Eduljee, his parents enrolled him in one of India's most prestigious schools, the Wynberg Allen Schools in the hills of Mussoorie, India. Upon graduating from Wynberg Allen, Eduljee joined the Flying College, Jodhpur in Rajasthan.

Eduljee received his commission as an officer in the Indian Air Force on 3 March 1941 at a time when Indians served with the allied forces during the Second World War (World War II).

Dinshaw Eduljee is presumed to have died following the crash of the fighter plane he was piloting. The crash took place near Sizwe, Burma not too far from the Indian border on 27 November 1944, a date some records use as the date of his death.

== Indian Air Force service ==
Dinshaw Eduljee was one of the first 200 officers in the Indian Air Force and served during the Second World War.

=== Service number 1669 ===
Eduljee received his commission on 3 March 1941. Service numbers (SN) for Indian Air Force officers started at 1551 and Eduljee's service number was 1669, indicating he was the 118th member of the IAF (service numbers in 2002 were in the 25,000s).

[Some prominent early IAF officers were: Subroto Mukerjee, SN 1551, the first IAF officer, received his commission on 1 October 1932; Aspi Engineer, SN 1554, who became an Air Marshal received his commission on 15 July 1933 and Aspi's brother Minoo (Minochehr Merwan) Engineer, SN 1614, received his commission on 1 August 1940.]

=== Deployment at Ambala, Bairagarh and Risalpur ===
In January 1942, Eduljee began service as a flight instructor at No. 1 Service Flying Training School (SFTS), Ambala - the same school at which he received his flight training and at which school he received an award and the highest performing trainee.

He was stationed in Bairagarh, Bhopal, from 16 October 1943 up to an unknown date. The unit to which he was assigned in Bairagarh was 1AGS (No.1 Air Gunners School also called No.1 Gunnery School). No.1 Air Gunners School undertook training of wireless operators and air gunners of the IAF. An aircraft deployed at Bairagarh 1AGS was the Boulton-Paul Defiant TT. I & TT.III

From around February 1944 to 1 June 1944, Eduljee was part of 27B Course at 151 Operational Training Unit (OTU)at Risalpur, North-West Frontier province, now in Pakistan.

At some point he became acting Flight Lieutenant.

=== Air Force Cross award ===
Eduljee was the first Indian officer to receive the AFC which was awarded to him on 1 June 1944. The award was recorded in the Supplement of the London Gazette of 8 June 1944. His rank in the Gazette is recorded as acting Flight Lieutenant.

Since then two other Indian Air Force officers were awarded the AFC: Flt. Lt. Pothery Charuvary Ramachandran (on 1 January 1945) and Flt. Lt. Homi Dhanjishaw Bharucha (on 1 September 1945).

The letter from Sqn Ldr Arjan Singh informing Dinshaw's father Ferozeshaw that his son was missing in action states, "His achievements and ability in instructional work at Ambala earned him the Air Force Cross, which is the highest honour one can get in that line, and he was the first and the only officer in the Indian Air Force to earn that decoration. From the operational training unit, he passed out with credit."

Dinshaw Eduljee's AFC citation reads: "This officer has been a flying instructor since January 1942. During that period, he has done much to provide liaison between the British and Indian members of his unit. An excellent flight commander, Flight Lieutenant Eduljee has set a fine example by his efficiency and enthusiasm. He has contributed a great deal to the training of the Indian Air Force."

=== Deployment to 1 Squadron at Imphal ===
Eduljee was subsequently deployed to Imphal on 1 June 1944 as part of the Indian Air Force's 1 squadron. Imphal was at one time a forward air base close to the British-Japanese front and operations out of Imphal were critical to first stopping the Japanese advance and then in the launching of the allied British and Indian counter-offensive against the Japanese Army occupying Burma.

During his deployment in Imphal, Eduljee flew the Hawker Hurricane aircraft which was used both as a fighter and reconnaissance plane. It was during his return from a reconnaissance mission behind Japanese lines that Eduljee's plane crashed.

== Crash and presumed demise ==
The account of Nanu K. Shitoley as related to Mukund Murty and recorded in the Bharat Rakshak archives:

"He (Shitoley) remembers that they (No. 1 Squadron) were engaged in almost non-stop Photo Reconnaissance/ Reconnaissance/ Ground Attack sorties, the last two at tree-top height - there was zero margin for error, and he remembers frequently encountering Japanese anti-aircraft fire on these sorties."

"October 1944 was a momentous month for the Allies, and a busy one for No. 1 Squadron. The fall of Bumzang was quickly followed by that of the critical Tiddim (the three critical points of the Japanese assault on Imphal were Tamu to the south of Imphal, Tiddim to the south-west, and Ukhrul to the north-east) on 18th October. The squadron did sterling work in the Kalewa/ Kalemyo area, more than 120 miles away from their base, flying a record 439 sorties [including three at night!] totaling 779 hrs 40' despite bad weather during the earlier part of the month. For this work the Squadron received four congratulatory messages from XXXIII Corps - a mammoth photo-reconnaissance task had been carried out, 9,555 prints were developed, and the Squadron well-deservedly praised 'for skill and speed with which air photographs have been produced and dropped on forward troops.'"

"November 1944 saw an even greater effort by the 17 pilots of the Squadron who flew an incredible 525 sorties totaling 1000 hrs 30' of which 25hrs 10' were by night. Whilst most of the sorties were in the Kalemyo / Kalewa area, they went further south up to Gangaw and Monywa [almost 200 miles away from Imphal - a glance at the Hurricane's fuel consumption given in Note [2] above gives an idea of the flying being carried out to the very limits of human and aeroplane endurance] and east up to the Mu River. On these sorties they usually went in pairs, but sometimes also singly. They were sometimes provided with a Spitfire escort as there was a very real danger from Japanese fighters on these sorties so far south of Imphal [the 460 mile range of the Hurricane vis-à-vis the 1864 mile range of the Oscar would ensure that any combat was one-sided !]. "The bridge at Hpaungzeik over the Neyinzaya Chaung [chaungs or streams were raging torrents in the monsoons, which would disappear into dusty tracks during the dry months was critical for the taking of Kalemyo, just south-west of it. Reconnaissance by day showed that the bridge was unserviceable, but piles of wooden planks stacked along the banks of the Chaung gave rise to the suspicion that these planks were placed on the bridge at night and used for traffic. Sqn. Ldr. Arjan Singh flew over Hpaungzeik on the night of the 3rd of November, 200 miles in the dark, and confirmed that this was, indeed, the case! Kalemyo fell on 15 November. "November 1944 saw two casualties for the squadron, one fatal (this is an assumption on the part of the narrator). On the 22nd, an aeroplane returning from a recce of the Wetkauk-Naungmana area force-landed after a glycol [coolant] leak. Although it caught fire after landing, the pilot got out safely and, after a three-day trek through hostile jungle, returned home. (On the 27th) The other pilot, D. F. Eduljee, the only AFC holder in the IAF at this time, failed to pull out of his dive whilst strafing some camouflaged bashas in the Shwegyin area."

A letter written by Squadron Leader Arjan Singh states "Your son took off in a Hurricane at 0700 hours on November 27, 1944, for a reconnaissance over the enemy road from Shwegyin to Pyingaing which is just about 15 miles southeast of Kalwa. The second pilot who went with your son in another Hurricane says that your son spotted a Japanese camp along the road and dived to machine gun it. This pilot followed him. In the meantime, your son had pulled out and was in a position for another attack. After the other pilot had pulled out, he saw a cloud of dust rising from the target area. He went low and saw a wing detached, lying apart from your son’s aircraft. Apparently while taking evasive action your son hit the trees with a wing and lost control of the aircraft. Except the wing no other part of the aircraft was visible from the air as it crashed in a very thick jungle. The pilot circled over the spot for some time but did not see any movement."

Wing Commander Hoshang K. Patel (Retd.), states in his memoirs that "I remember his (D. F. Eduljee's) death (this should read crash); he was making multiple passes at a ground target. During one of them he was coming out of a roll quite close to the ground, misjudged it and flew straight in."

A letter from Sqn Ldr Arjan Singh informed Dinshaw's father Ferozeshaw stated, "Before you get this letter you must have received a telegram stating that your son is 'Missing believed killed' from operational sortie over Kalwa (likely Kalewa) area." The letter goes on to say, "We all express deepest sympathy in your great anxiety and pray that he is safe. Any further information, which we hope to obtain through various sources, will be conveyed to you immediately when it is received." However, the family received no further intimation on Dinshaw and since then have assumed that Dinshaw died sometime after the crash.

Dinshaw Eduljee's service record states that his service with the IAF ended when he "Died in Service 27 Nov 44". However, no one saw him killed nor has a grave been found. The circumstances of his death: where, when and how are not known.

While Dinshaw Eduljee's name is inscribed under "Missing in Action" on Column 445 in Singapore's Kranji War Memorial that stands beside the Kranji War Cemetery, his final resting place is listed as unknown.

A notation in No. 1 Squadron's (the squad with which Eduljee was serving at the time of his crash) flight log states, "si monumentum requiris, circumspice". This translates to 'If you seek his monument, look around you'. Perhaps this meant that though Eduljee would possibly never be found or have a tombstone placed over his remains, his monument nevertheless was his work – represented by the many successful pilots of the Indian Air Force he had helped to train.

== Background ==
=== IAF during early WW II ===
Dinshaw Eduljee was commissioned as an officer in Indian Air Force shortly after it was formed before the Second World War.

In a book titled The Air Force Act, 1950 by K. C. Sanandan we find mention of the Indian Air Force Act of 1932. It appears that the provision of this Act was debated in the British House of Commons in April 1933.

From the records maintained by Hansard of a debate in the British House of Commons on 3 April 1933, it would appear that the Hon. Rhys Davies took exception to his treatment as well as a memorandum that stated, "The Government of India have decided that steps shall be taken at once to commence the formation of an Indian Air Force." Mr. Davies wondered if the Indian Government could take such as unilateral step.

In any event, it appears that the Act establishing the Indian Air Force was proclaimed on 8 October 1932, a day that continues to be celebrated as Air Force Day in India.

The first operation unit of the Indian Air Force, a flight, was formed in April 1933 with six officers and 19 airmen (hawai sepoy). At the outbreak of the Second World War (WW II), the IAF consisted of one squadron, 16 officers and 269 airmen. At the end of WW II, the IAF had nine squadrons. Squadrons 1,2,3,4,6,7,9 and 10 had Hurricanes and No.8 had Spitfires. Five of the Hurricane-equipped squadrons played a major role in the Arakan offensive which began in December 1944. They disrupted Japanese communication lines and constantly harassed the Japanese forces, thus planning a significant role in the victory of the Allied forces over the Japanese in Burma - a victory that culminated in the retaking of Rangoon on 3 May 1945.

=== IAF's No. 1 Squadron - its formation ===
Dinshaw Eduljee was a part of the Indian Air Force's No. 1 Squadron, the very first squadron of the Indian Air Force.

At its formation, the Indian Air Force consisted of one flight, "A" Flight, that was part of a planned squadron called No. 1 Squadron. "A" Flight of No. 1 Squadron was formally established on 1 April 1933 and was located at Drigh Road in Karachi. Its complement of aircraft consisted of four outdated Westland Wapiti IIAs. The flight which was commanded by Flight Lieutenant C. A. Bouchier (DFC) from the Royal Air Force (RAF), included six Indian officers and nineteen support personnel and technicians then known as Hawai Sepoys (literally Air Soldiers).

The six Indian officers (who had recently graduated from training at RAF Cranwell) were H. C. Sircar (SN?), Subroto Mukherjee (SN 1551, OBE, later Air Marshal and the first Chief of the Staff of the IAF), A. B. Awan (SN 1552), Jagat Narain Tandon (SN 1553), Bhupendra Singh (SN?) and Amarjit Singh (SN?). These officers had started their training in 1930 and were commissioned in late 1932.

Later notable members of the squadron included Aspi Merwan Engineer, (SN 1554, DFC, later Air Marshal and the Chief of the Air Staff), Karun Krishna Majumdar (SN 1555, DFC & Bar), Narendra (SN 1556, full name not known), Ravindra Hari Darshan Singh (SN 1558), Prithipal Singh (SN 1578), Mehar Singh (SN 1559, MVC DSO), S. N. Goyal (SN 1560) and Arjan Singh (SN 1577, DFC, later Air Marshal).

Four-and-a-half years after its formation - towards the end of 1937 - "A" Flight saw was in combat action for the first time in Miranshah, North Waziristan, part of the Northwest Frontier Province. It flew in support Indian Army operations against the insurgent Bhittani tribesmen.

The early and formative years (1933 to 1937) of the squadron saw it being deployed against hostile tribesmen in Northwest Frontier Province in general and Waziristan in particular, areas that are today part of Pakistan and which continue to be targets of air strikes both by the Pakistani Air Force and US unmanned drone attacks (see Miranshah airstrike). Then Flight Officer Aspi Engineer was "Mentioned-in-Despatches" for gallantry during these operations.

On 16 March 1939, Subroto Mukherjee who was the Flight commander of the squadron's "A" Flight took over command of the Squadron from Squadron Leader C. H. Smith, the first Indian Air Force officer to gain that position.

In 1944, at the time Dinshaw Eduljee was shot down, No. 1 Squadron was based in Imphal, and its commanding officer (CO) was Squadron Leader Arjan Singh.

=== Hawker Hurricane ===
The aircraft flown by Dinshaw Eduljee when he crashed in Burma was the Hawker Hurricane.

The Hurricane saw service in the IAF from 1942 to about 1945. From 1943 to 1944, IAF squadrons using the Hurricanes were deployed on the India-Burma front. The Hawker Hurricanes could fly at speeds in of 480 km/h and more (547 km/h). While on missions, the planes often flew in pairs – a lead pilot and a wingman (also called a weaver). During his last flight, Eduljee was the lead pilot while Flying Officer Codanda Machia Cariappa was his wingman.
