= Dunshah =

Dunshah دونشاه
- Village
- Country: Iran
- Province: Razavi Khorasan
- County: Dargaz
- Bakhsh: Chapeshlu
- Rural District: Miankuh

Population (2006)
  - Total: 42
- Time zone: UTC+3:30 (IRST)
  - Summer (DST): UTC+4:30 (IRDT)

Dunshah (Persian: دونشاه, also Romanized as Dūnshāh) is a village in Miankuh Rural District, Chapeshlu District, Dargaz County, Razavi Khorasan Province, Iran. At the 2006 census, its population was 42, in 12 families.
