= Dan Shaw =

Canadian football player (1934–1992)

Profile
- Positions: Guard, Tackle

Personal information
- Born: 1934; Toronto
- Died: 1992 (aged 57–58); Toronto
- Listed height: 6 ft 1 in (1.85 m)
- Listed weight: 233 lb (106 kg)

Career history
- 1954–1957: Toronto Argonauts

Dan Shaw (1934–1992) was Canadian football player who played for the Toronto Argonauts.
