= Seth Edulji Dinshaw =

Parsi merchant, landowner and philanthropist in Karachi (1842–1914)

Eduljee (Edulji) Dinshaw CIE
- Born: 1842 (Note: The Board of Trade register of deceased passengers gives his birthplace as Bombay and his age at death in May 1914 as 72. A business profile first published in 1920 says he left Bombay for Karachi at the age of eighteen. One modern account gives his birthplace as Poona. The exact date of 18 May 1842, given in some sources, has not been traced to a primary record.)
- Died: 9 May 1914 (aged 72); Gulf of Suez, aboard the SS City of Lahore
- Other names: Seth Edulji Dinshaw; Edaljee / Edalji Dinshaw
- Occupations: Army contractor, merchant, landowner, philanthropist
- Known for: Largest landowner in Karachi; Edulji Dinshaw Dispensary; Lady Dufferin Hospital
- Children: Nadirshaw Edulji Dinshaw; Framroze Eduljee Dinshaw (F. E. Dinshaw)
- Awards: Companion of the Order of the Indian Empire (1899)

Eduljee (Edulji) Dinshaw CIE (1842 – 9 May 1914), often referred to as Seth Edulji Dinshaw, was a Parsi merchant and philanthropist in Karachi, then part of the Bombay Presidency of British India. He made his first fortune supplying the British Army during the Second Anglo-Afghan War (1878–1880) and invested the proceeds in land, buildings and factories, becoming the city's largest landowner. Amongst his many charitable donations, he funded three free dispensaries and was the largest single donor to the Lady Dufferin Hospital in Karachi. In 1899 he was appointed a Companion of the Order of the Indian Empire.

"Seth" is not part of his name. It is an honorific, used in western India for a merchant or banker, and is commonly placed before the names of prominent Parsi and other businessmen of the period. His own institutions used the spelling "Eduljee"; the forms "Edulji", "Edaljee" and "Edalji" also appear in contemporary records.

== Early life ==
Dinshaw was born in about 1842. According to a profile published in 1920, he received "a good business training" under an uncle who owned large provision stores, arriving in Karachi in the early 1860s, aged eighteen, at a time when the port was still small. Khuhro and Mooraj say that he grew up in Karachi, was educated at the Narayan Jagannath High School and became an army contractor when he was 21 or 22.

== Business career ==
Karachi was the main supply base for the Second Anglo-Afghan War, and Dinshaw built his fortune as a contractor to the British forces. According to Khuhro and Mooraj, he supplied food using camel transport, and the work earned him the trust of the government.

On the advice of friends he invested his profits in Karachi land, especially near the sea front. He put up offices, warehouses (godowns) and houses on it. Many of his purchases were swamps and tidal sands that others thought worthless, around Victoria Road, City Station and Bath Island. The 1920 profile says many of the largest buildings in Karachi owed their existence to him, and that his descendants were said to own nearly two-thirds of the city's properties. By the late nineteenth century he was reported to own around half of Karachi, and the business writer Michael Backman states that the colonial authorities informally barred him from acquiring any more land.

His industrial ventures included a factory for pressing cotton and wool for export, said to be one of the first in the Karachi district, an ice factory and the Eduljee Dinshaw Press. He was a director of the Land and Shipping Company and was involved with the Sind Gazette and the Sind Light Railways. He was Karachi's largest coal importer and traded in Burma teak.

He also exported camels from Sindh to Western Australia for transport between Fremantle and the Coolgardie goldfields. In May 1897 a notice in The Coolgardie Miner named the camel proprietors E. Dinshaw and Co. as a partnership of "Eduljee Dinshaw and Arsala".

His son Nadirshaw joined the business as a partner in 1878.

== Philanthropy ==
Dinshaw's gifts benefited people of all communities as well as his fellow Parsis. The 1920 profile stressed that his charity was "never influenced by any narrow sectarian spirit". The Dinshaw family charities later concentrated on medicine and housing for the poor.

=== Medical ===
The Eduljee Dinshaw Charitable Dispensary in Saddar, opened in 1882

The Eduljee Dinshaw Wing of the Lady Dufferin Hospital

Dinshaw funded three free dispensaries in Karachi, opened in 1882, 1887 and 1903.

- Eduljee Dinshaw Charitable Dispensary, Saddar (1882). The building, designed by the municipal engineer James Strachan in an Italianate style, is still in use. Punthakey states that Dinshaw gave Rs 5,000 and the Karachi Municipality an equal sum.
- Bachubai Eduljee Dinshaw Dispensary, Keamari (1887), named after his wife.
- Nadarshah Eduljee Dinshaw Dispensary, Lawrence Road (now Nishtar Road) (1903), named after his son.

The Lady Dufferin Hospital was proposed in 1885, but the Rs 15,000 raised from the public and the Dufferin Fund committee was not enough to build it. In 1894 Dinshaw gave Rs 50,000, which allowed work to begin. He later met the rising building costs and paid for the hospital's first medical supplies, and his son Nadirshaw gave the furniture; in all, the family gave about Rs 85,000. Hinnells describes him as the hospital's single largest donor, and a ward was kept there for Parsis. He also contributed to its upkeep. A wing of the hospital bears his name.

=== Education ===
- Sind Arts College (later D. J. Sind College). He was the largest single donor at the college's foundation and one of its three main Parsi benefactors. Punthakey records gifts of Rs 3,000 in 1885 and a further Rs 3,000 in 1887.
- Mama Parsi Girls' School. He gave Rs 75,000 and started a hostel at the school.
- University of Bombay. According to Khuhro and Mooraj, he left Rs 7.5 lakh to the university in his will to provide technical education for Parsi students.

=== Community funds ===
He set up charitable funds for poor Parsis in memory of each of his two wives: the Bachubai Eduljee Dinshaw funds of 1886 and the Soonabai Eduljee Dinshaw Charitable Fund of 1898.

=== Other ===
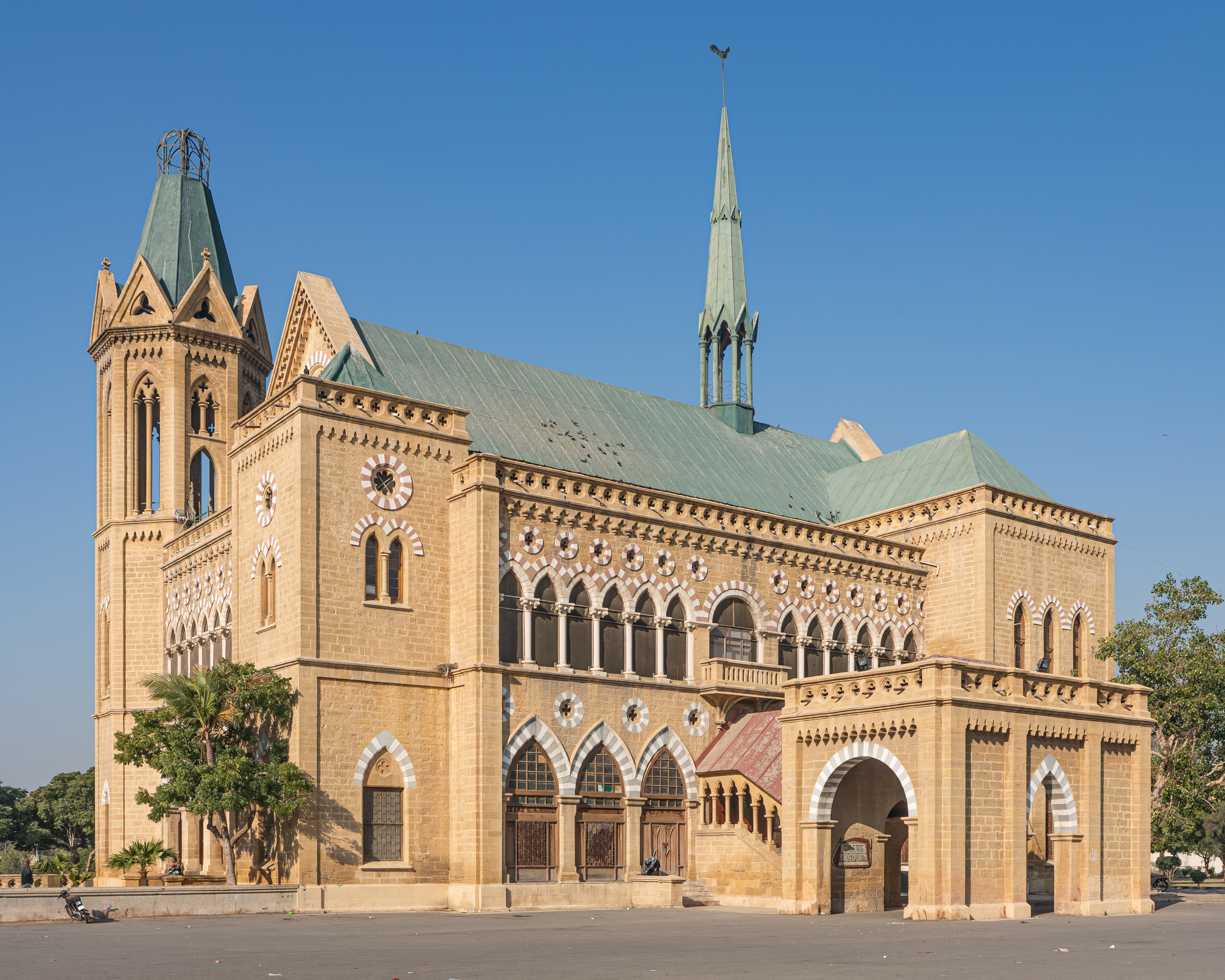
Frere Hall, Karachi, where he gave a marble fountain and a bust of Edward VII

- A marble fountain with carved seraphs at Frere Hall (1890), now damaged.
- A bust of Edward VII at Frere Hall.

== Public life and honours ==
Dinshaw was a trustee of the Karachi Port Trust, a member of the Karachi Municipality and a delegate of the Parsi Matrimonial Court.

He was appointed a Companion of the Order of the Indian Empire (CIE) in the 1899 New Year Honours, in recognition of his services to Karachi. Punthakey states that he was the first person in Karachi to receive the honour. On 19 June 1899 he was among the Indian gentlemen presented at a levée by the Political Aide-de-Camp to the Secretary of State for India. Queen Victoria invested him with the insignia at Windsor Castle on 1 March 1900. He attended the levée held on the Queen's behalf by the Duke of York at St James's Palace on 6 July 1900.

In 1903 he became the only Indian appointed an honorary member of the Sind Volunteer Corps.

== Personal life ==
Dinshaw married twice; his wives were Bachubai and Soonabai. He had two sons, Nadirshaw Edulji Dinshaw (1862–1922) and Framroze Eduljee Dinshaw, known as F. E. Dinshaw.

He also owned property in England. In August 1905, giving his address as the Beulah Spa Hotel, Upper Norwood, he applied to register the freehold of Spring Lodge, Lawrie Park Road, Sydenham.

== Death ==
Dinshaw died at sea on 9 May 1914, aged 72, aboard the Ellerman's Hall Line steamer City of Lahore, on a voyage from Karachi to Plymouth. The Board of Trade register of deceased passengers gives the cause of death as Bright's disease and acute bronchitis, and records his position as 29°30′N 32°35′E, in the Gulf of Suez. The 1923 probate calendar also records that he died on 9 May 1914 in the Gulf of Suez. (Note: Some community histories give the date of death as 8 May 1914 and the place as near Port Said.)

His English estate was administered in London in 1915 and again in August 1923, when administration (with the will, limited) was granted to the attorney of Framroz Edalji Dinshaw and Kaikhushroo Nanabhoy Spencer. His real estate and businesses in Karachi passed to Nadirshaw.

== Legacy ==
In 1933 statues of Dinshaw and of his son Nadirshaw were erected in central Karachi. His statue stood at a junction on Victoria Road (now Abdullah Haroon Road), opposite Holy Trinity Church. After Partition the statues were removed and kept in a municipal storehouse; they now stand in the grounds of the Karachi Parsi Institute. The 1882 dispensary in Saddar is still in use.

His descendants continued his business and charities. Nadirshaw's sons funded the Prince of Wales Engineering College, which was renamed the Nadirshaw Eduljee Dinshaw (NED) Engineering College in 1924 and is now NED University of Engineering and Technology. His grandson Hoshang N. E. Dinshaw (died 1967) was president of the central board of the National Bank of Pakistan from 1952 to 1964. His younger son, F. E. Dinshaw (died 1936), became a prominent Bombay lawyer and financier, being a director of the Reserve Bank of India and of Tata Steel and financial agent to the Maharaja of Gwalior. A great-grandson, Nadir Dinshaw (1925–2002), became a philanthropist in Jersey and Britain.
