= Bharat Rakshak =

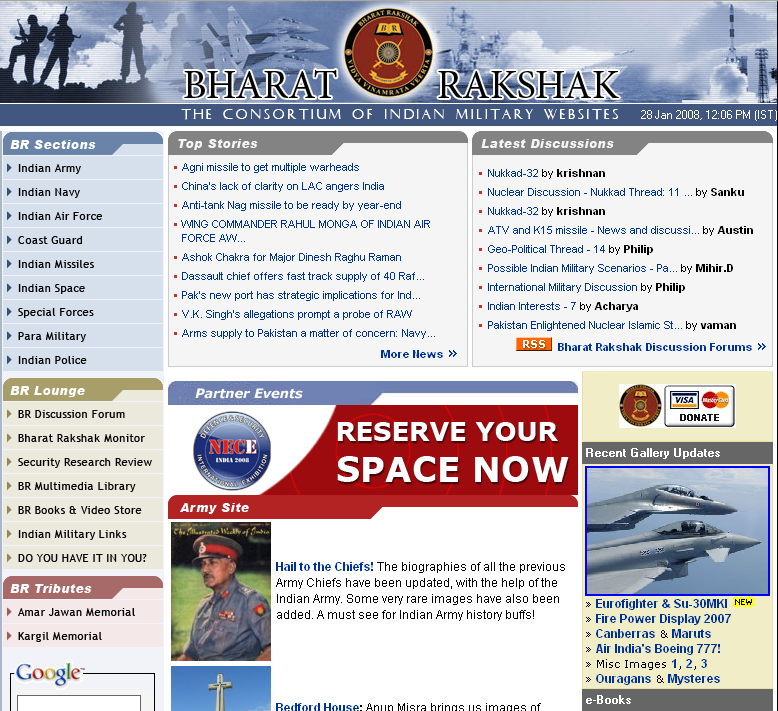
- Bharat Rakshak home page on 28 January 2007
- Website type: Military information and community website
- Available in: English
- Owner: Seetal Ramesh Patel
- Website: www.bharat-rakshak.com
- Commercial: No
- Registration: Optional (required for forum)
- Launched: July 1, 1997; 29 years ago
- Current status: Active

Bharat Rakshak (lit. 'Defenders of India') is a website devoted to discussing the Military of India. It was started and is run by military enthusiasts.

== History ==
Bharat Rakshak was started in April 1997 by bringing together the individual websites of Indian Defence enthusiasts. The website was officially launched on 1 July 1997 by Seetal Patel and Rupak Chattopadhyay. While the concept of Open Source intelligence, as defined by the United States intelligence community, is still evolving in India, Bharat Rakshak has been cited as a website that could be held in the same category as its western counterparts. The forum has many members with experience in Indian Armed Forces and defence technology firms.

The site gained some notoriety in December 2007, when it was cited for leaking the Official War Histories written by the Indian Ministry of Defence (MoD) that had remained classified for sometime.

== Features ==
- An active discussion forum, which has been referred to in the press as a think-tank of Indian military issues.
- Discussion forums have threads in the following categories:
  1. Military Issues & History Forum
  2. Strategic Issues & International Relations Forum
  3. Technology & Economic Forum
  4. General Discussion Forums (Accessible only to registered members)
- The first three forum thread categories were available to public and the last general discussion forums was only available to registered members and was not visible for non-members.
- Discussions in first three forums focused on current military, strategic and technical/economic affairs of the day. With threads, highly active dedicated to Tejas, Arjun among others it remains a credible place to form viewpoint.
- The site also has detailed history on conflicts e.g. Siachen, and Kargil War
- An online bookstore, which specialises in the sourcing of books related to the Indian Military.
- A multimedia section, with a considerable number of video clippings and audio recordings of Military marches played by the bands of Indian Army, the Navy and Air Force. It also includes a significant collection of books devoted to various topics like Military History, Security Issues and Nuclear Issues. Their articles on nuclear issues have received press coverage.

== Related sites ==
On 15 August 2000, Bharat Rakshak launched a sister website called Amar Jawan. The Amar Jawan website is dedicated to the personnel of India's Armed Forces; it means "Immortal Soldier" in Hindi.
