= Nadirshaw Edulji Dinshaw =

Indian philanthropist (1862–1922)

- Born: 1862
- Died: 1922 (aged 59–60)

Nadirshaw Edulji Dinshaw (1862 – 1922) was the eldest son of the Karachi landowner and philanthropist Seth Edulji Dinshaw. He lived in Karachi, Sindh,British India.

== Business and philanthropy ==
When his studies were complete, he entered the family business in land and factories. He continued his father's philanthropic work, and in recognition of his contribution to the city of Karachi, his statue was placed at the intersection of Karachi's main roads in the 1930s.

== NED University of Engineering and Technology ==
In 1924, the Prince of Wales Engineering College was renamed to NED University of Engineering & Technology after his sons made donations to the College in remembrance of their father.

== Family ==
His brother, Framroze Edulji Dinshaw (known as FE Dinshaw) was one of pre-partition India's most prominent businessmen and lawyers. He had four sons, Hoshang, Minocher, Dinshaw and Faredoon.

His son Hoshang NE Dinshaw played a part in the economic development of Pakistan, including as the President of the Central Board of Directors of the National Bank of Pakistan.

The descendants of Nadirshaw Edulji Dinshaw have kept up his philanthropic tradition. The Edulji Dinshaw family remains particularly noted for their charitable donations, especially to non-Parsis.

== See also ==
- NED University of Engineering & Technology
- Seth Edulji Dinshaw
- List of Parsis
