= Serai Quarter =

Serai Quarter سرائے کوارٹر
- Locality
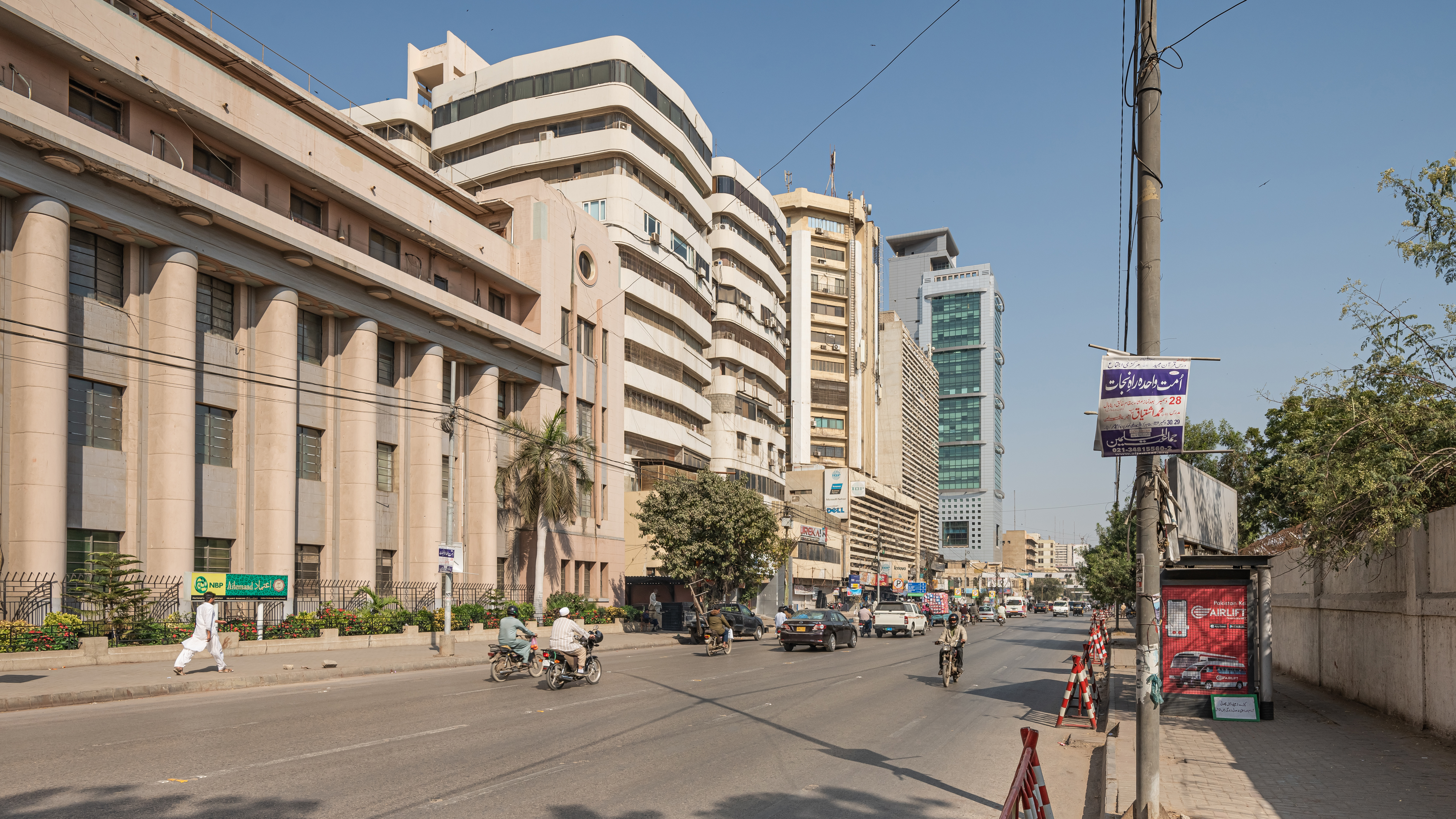
- I. I. Chundrigar Road, now known as the "Wall Street of Pakistan," passes through the historic Serai Quarter.
- Country: Pakistan
- Province: Sindh
- City: Karachi

Government
  - Constituency: NA-247 (Karachi South-II)
  - National Assembly Member: Aftab Siddiqui (PTI)

Serai Quarter (Urdu: سرائے کوارٹر), sometimes called Serai Quarters, is a neighbourhood in central Karachi, Pakistan that according to Pakistan forms much of its historic central business district. In addition to Karachi's financial centre centred on Serai Quarter's I. I. Chundrigar Road, Serai Quarter contains over 200 "historic buildings", which make up about 37% of all building plots in the quarter. Of these, 78 are protected by the Sindh Cultural Heritage Preservation Act of 1994.

== Location ==
Serai Quarter is a triangular-shaped district, and Muhammad Ali Jinnah Road, Dr. Ziauddin Ahmed Road, and I. I. Chundrigar Road serve as its northeast, western, and southern boundaries respectively. It is located immediately east of Karachi's Old Town of Mithadar.

== History ==
Serai Quarter was established as a "kafila serai," or caravanserai, outside the walls of Karachi supposedly before the British era. During Talpur rule, the Rah-i-Bandar road was built to connect the city's port to the caravan terminals - this road in the 1860s would eventually be further developed by the British into Bandar Road (now Muhammad Ali Jinnah Road).

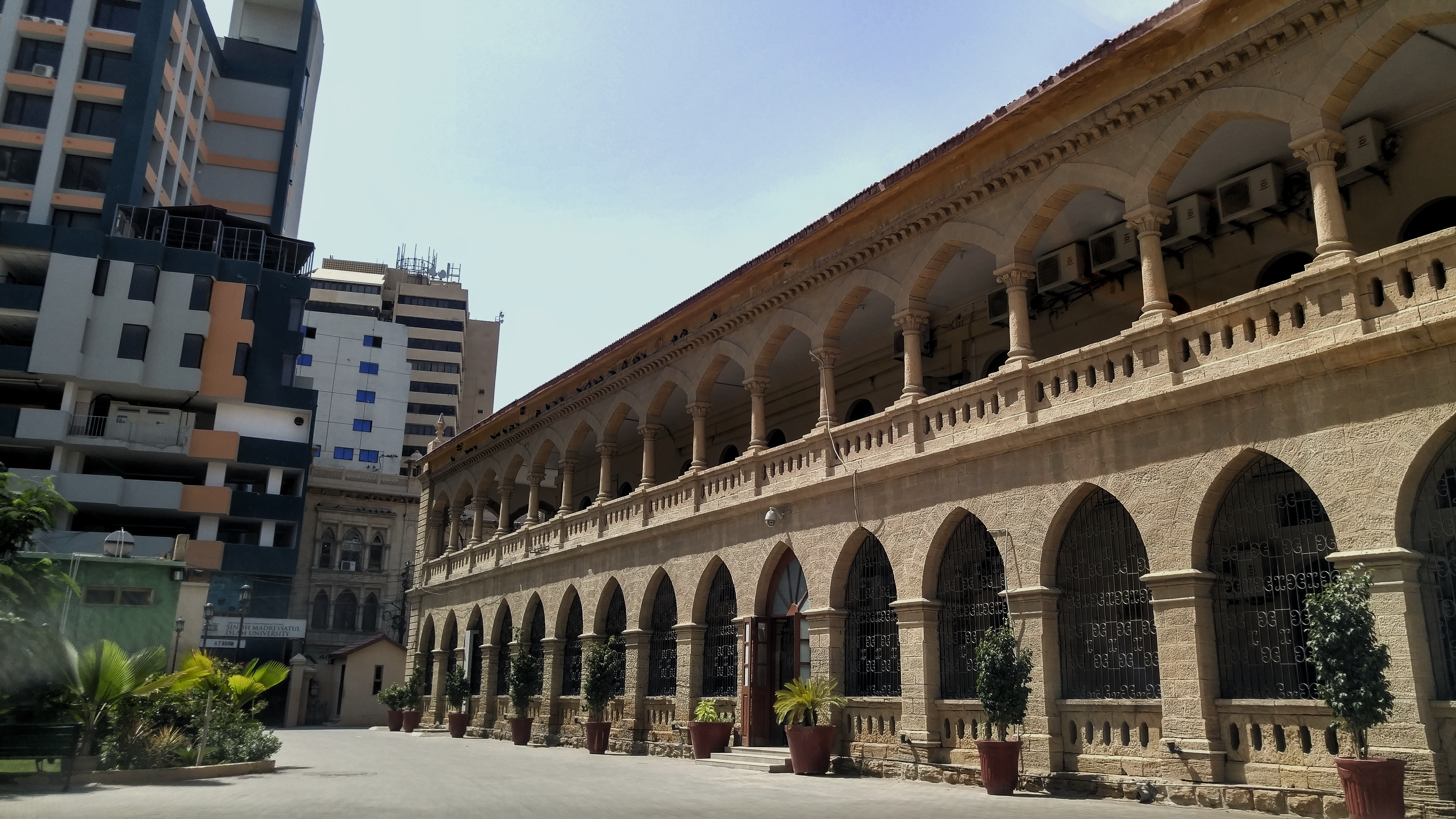
The Sindh Madressatul Islam was established in 1885 on the grounds of the former caravanserai which gives the quarter its name.

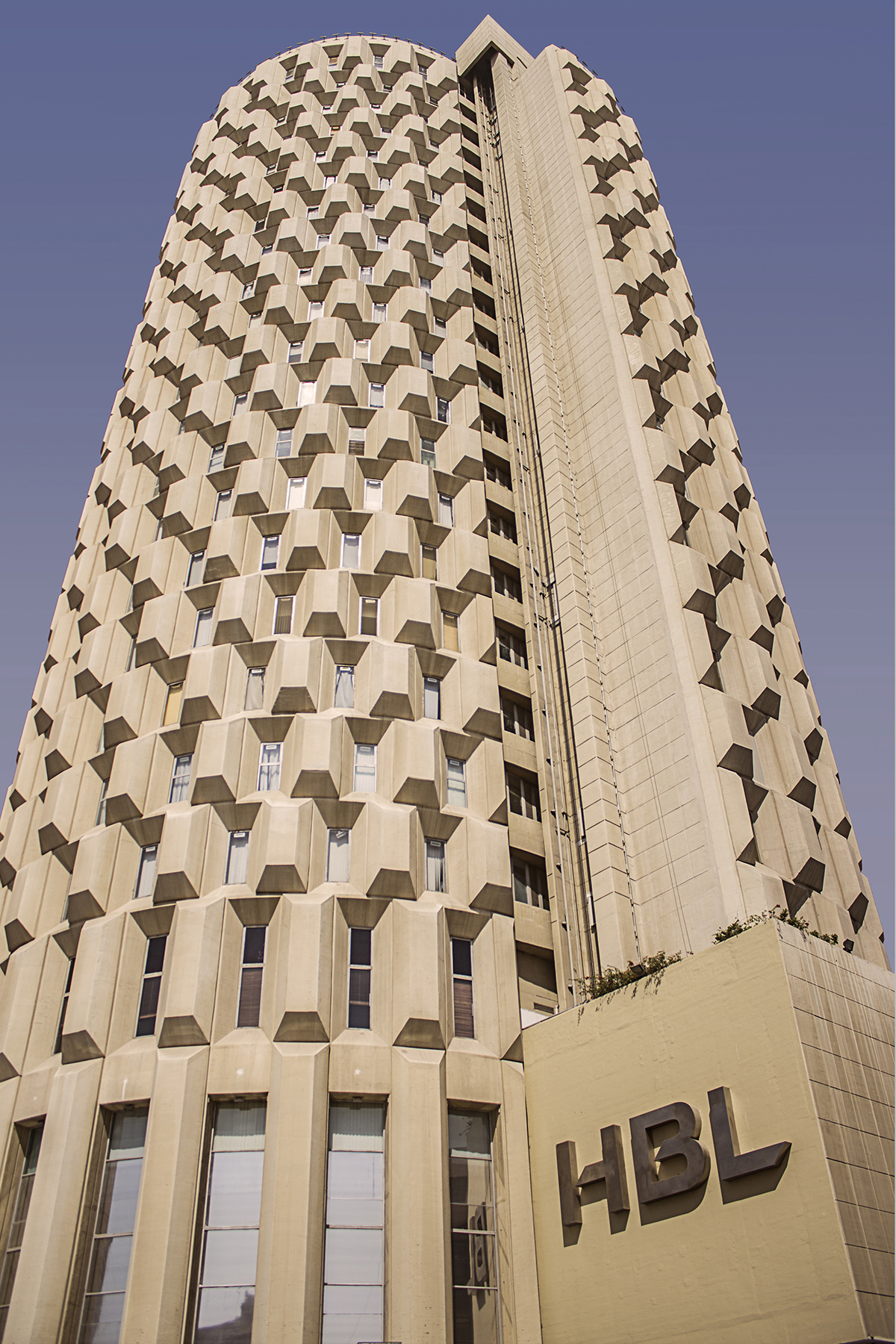
Habib Bank Plaza, built in 1963, was once the tallest building in South Asia

By 1830, Karachi had a population of about 15,000 and was no longer confined to the old fortified settlement today known as Mithadar. Suburbs formed to the east of the old town in Serai Quarter. Along with Mithadar, Serai Quarter formed the pre-British extent of Karachi.

When the British took control of Karachi in 1839, the terms of the surrender gave the British the ability to deploy troops around the city while allowing the Talpurs to continue running the city's civic affairs. A new military camp was established to the west of the old city, which was subsequently given the name "Serai Quarter" by the British.

Several cotton warehouses and offices were established in the 1860s in Serai Quarter's McLeod Road (now I. I. Chundrigar Road) during a cotton boom in the region after the American Civil War. In 1871, the population of the Serai Quarter was 2,137. By the 1870s, a number of European banks and companies were established along the street. In the 1870s, a small railway station was built along the southern edge of the road, which was upgraded in the 1880s, and eventually developed into the Karachi City railway station.

By the 1880s, Serai Quarter had become a "commercially prestigious" center for both Karachi's natives and Europeans, while Saddar was established as the primary commercial center for Karachi's European population. The original "kafila serai" grounds were eventually incorporated into the Sindh Madressatul Islam.

In 1963, Habib Bank Plaza was built in the Serai Quarter, which remained the tallest building of Pakistan until 2005, when the MCB Tower, also built in Serai Quarter, was completed.

== Economy ==
Serai Quarter is home to Pakistan's largest financial centre, with its I. I. Chundrigar Road often referred to as "Pakistan's Wall Street". The Karachi Stock Exchange, now consolidated as part of the Pakistan Stock Exchange, is located on the street. Numerous banks are also headquartered along the street, such as Habib Bank Limited, United Bank Limited, Standard Chartered Bank of Pakistan, as well as both the National Bank of Pakistan and the State Bank of Pakistan. Serai Quarter is also home to the headquarters of the Karachi Chamber of Commerce & Industry, and Geo News.

== Gallery ==
The following are heritage buildings in the Serai Quarter which are protected by the Government of Sindh.

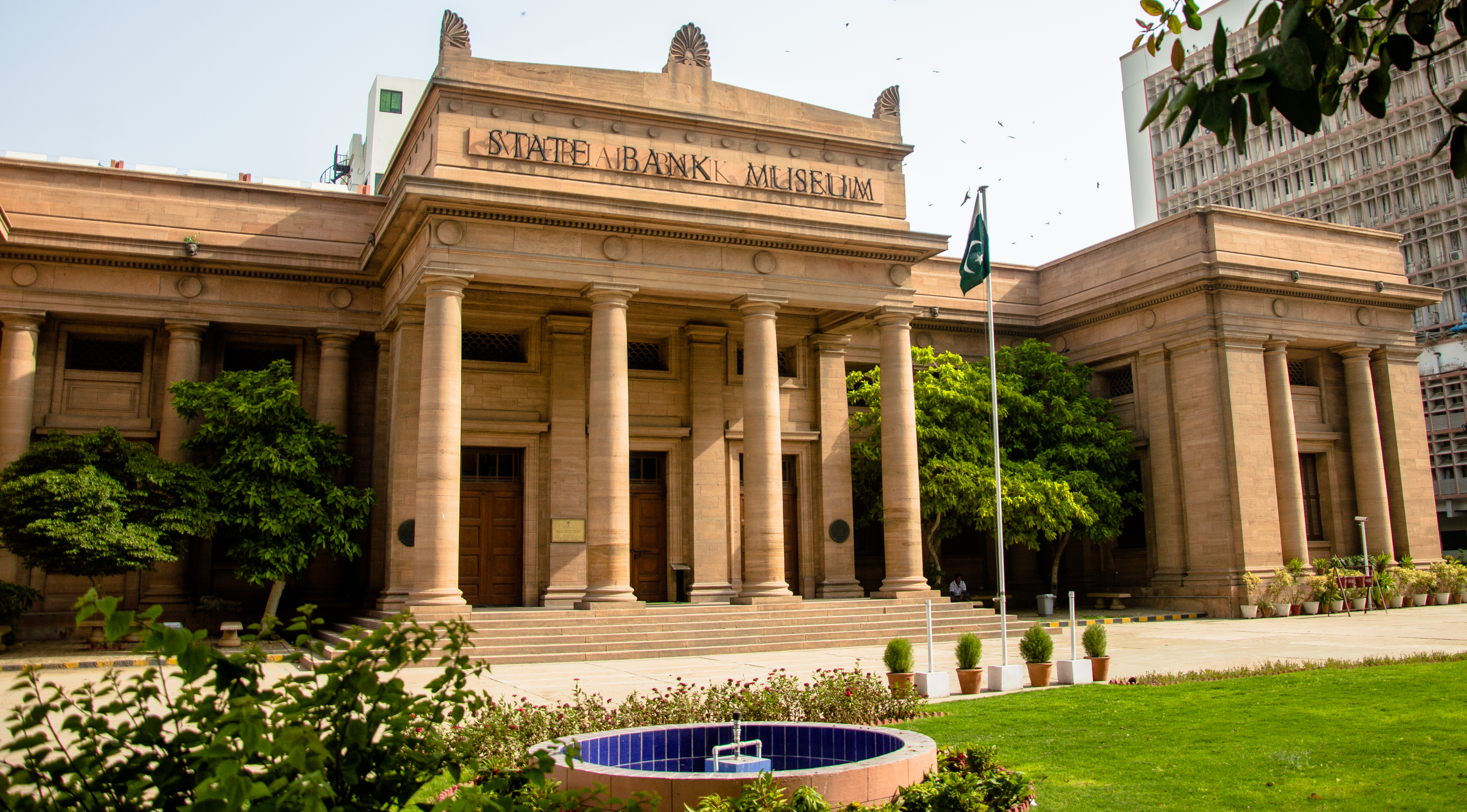
The historic State Bank of Pakistan building now serves as the State Bank of Pakistan Museum

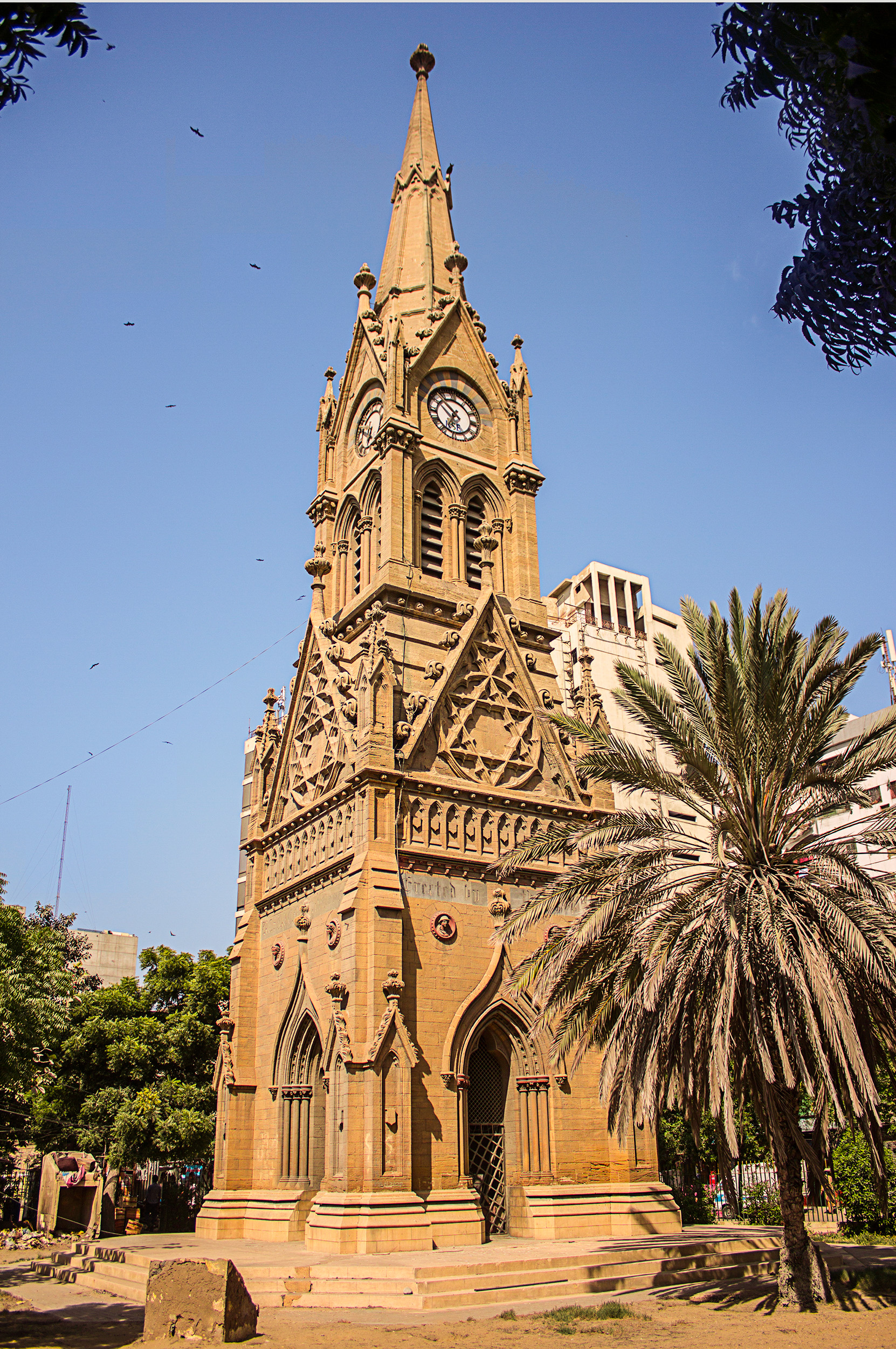
Merewether Clock Tower forms the westernmost point of Serai Quarter

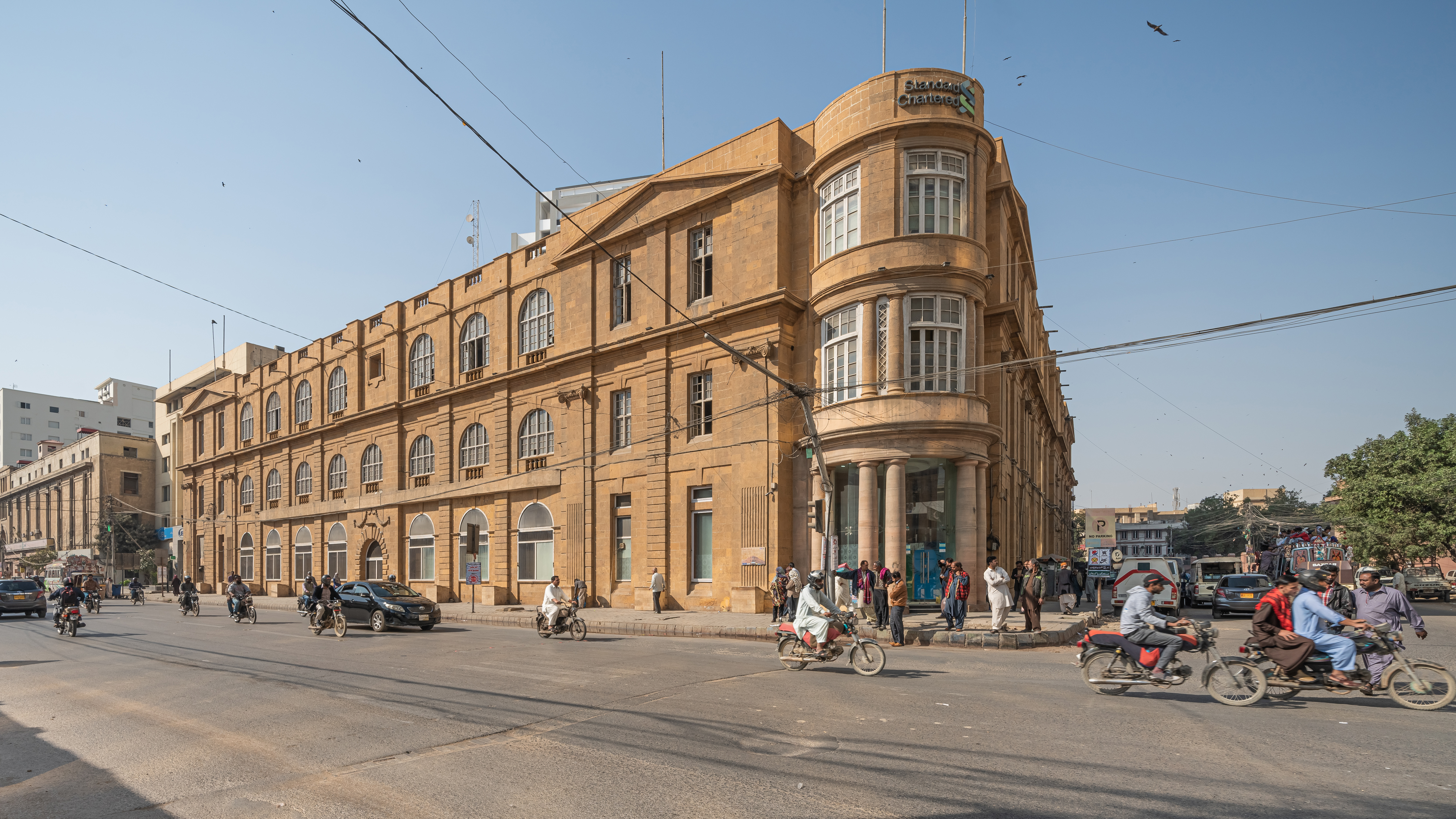
Historic headquarters of the Standard Chartered Pakistan

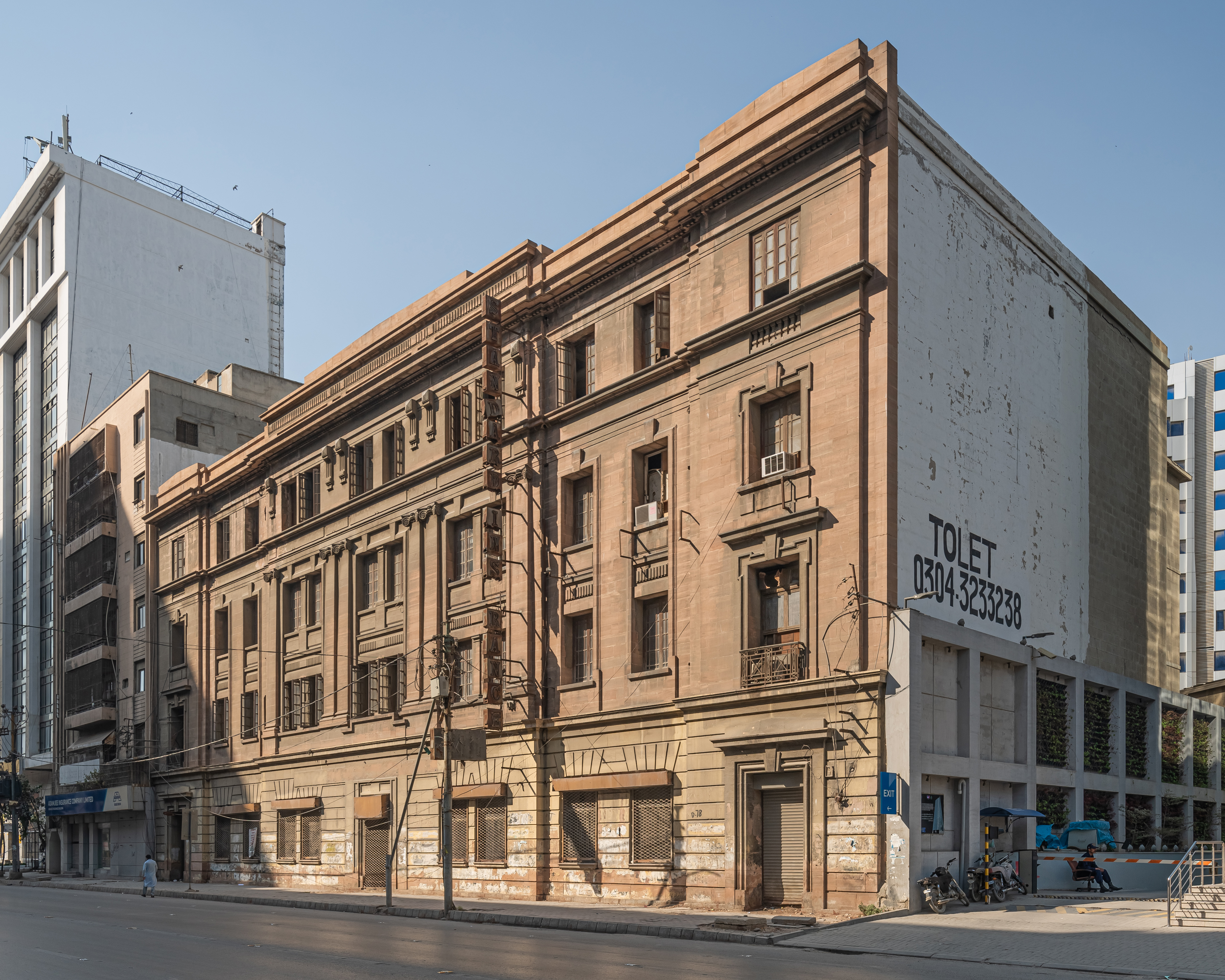
Standard Insurance House, built in 1905

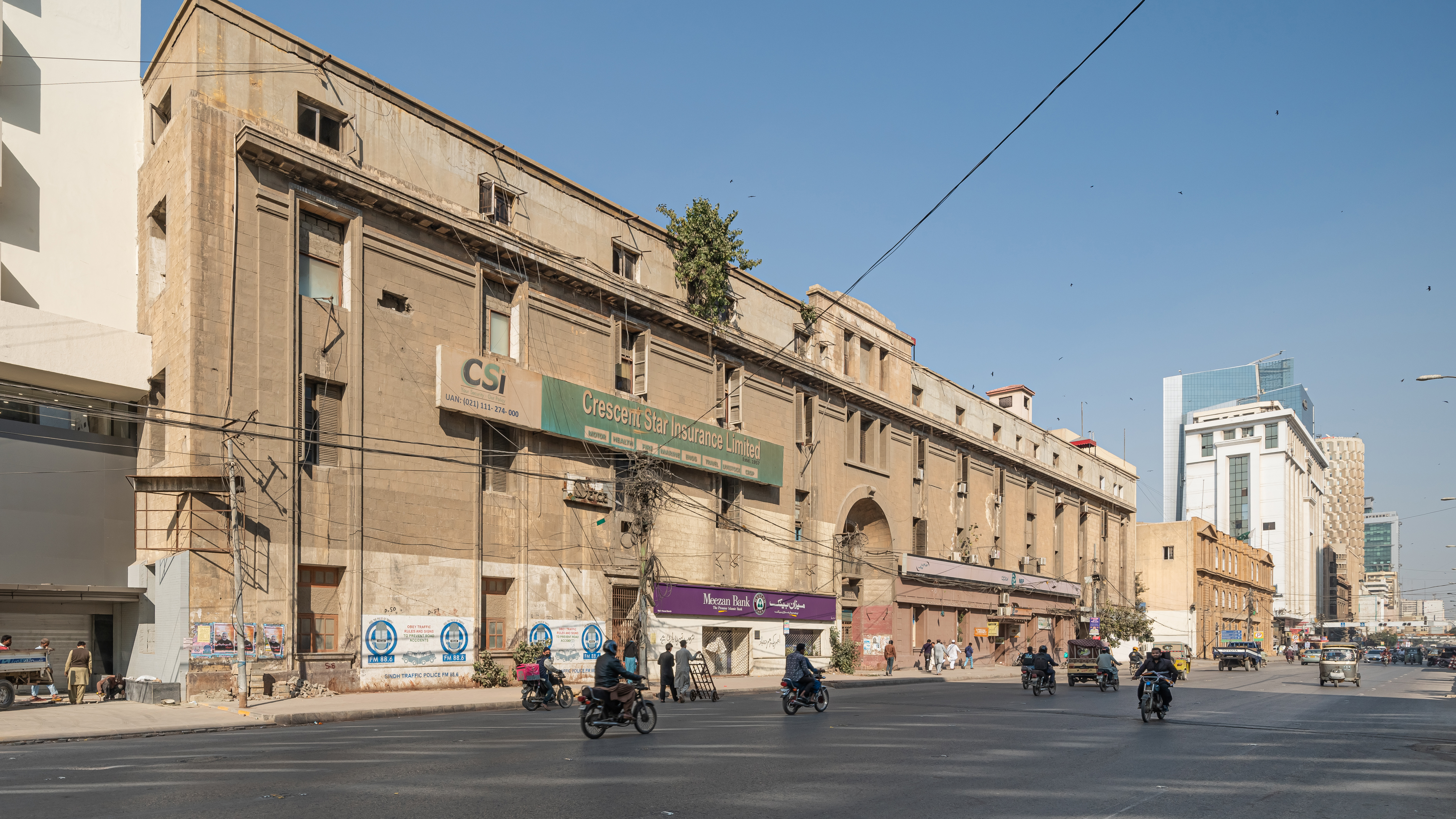
Nadir House

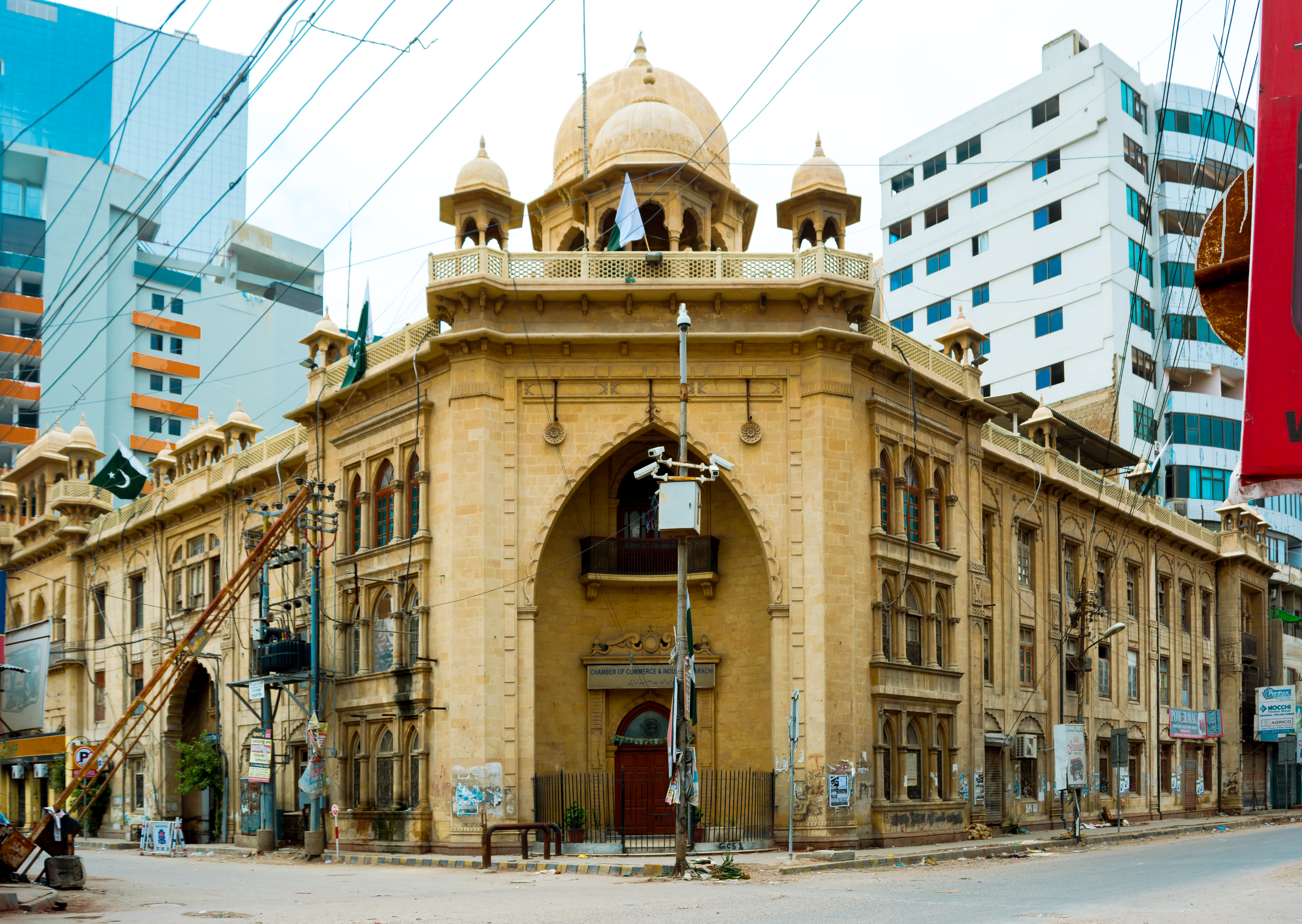
The foundation stone of the Karachi Chamber of Commerce and Industry Building was laid by Gandhi in 1934
