= Education City Karachi =

Education City Karachi is a precinct of educational facilities from school age to research level encompassing branch campuses of leading national and international institutions, along the lines of Dubai International Academic City and Education City Qatar

== History ==
The idea of an Education City had been proposed by the Sindh cabinet on October 16, 2001. It was revived in 2004, when the provincial Chief Secretary directed the city government to prepare a map indicating the boundaries of the project site, categories of allotments, lease period, roads, amenity plots, etc., in order to get the project under way. The city will be located on 8,000 acres of Deh Chuhar, a strip of land linking National Highway and Super Highway.

Fast forward to 2013 and a number of institutions have express an interest in setting up campuses with this precinct. They are the Aga Khan University Hospital, Sindh Institute of Urology & Transplantation, Quaid-e-Azam Public School (a project of Sindh Madressa Board), Shaheed Zulfikar Ali Bhutto Institute of Science and Technology, Sir Syed University of Engineering and Technology, Ziauddin University, Habib University Foundation, Newports Institute of Communication and Economics, Dow University of Health Sciences and the Judicial Academy of Sindh.

In 2014 the Education City Board constituted a 5-member core committee to oversee development works, audit and financial matters and human resources, and a finance committee.

It is expected that the $800 million is to be spent on the infrastructure development of the Education City.

The Sindh Board of Investment which appears to have responsibility for the project, has said that the provincial government would start construction work on the Education City project from January 2018.

The NED University of Engineering and Technology is the first institution to be allocated a site in Education City to establish a campus.

On September 21, 2017, the Chief Minister of Sindh Murad Ali Shah offered to give land to build a Catholic University on Link Road in Education City to the Archbishop of Karachi Joseph Coutts.

== Progress ==
In December 2017, the foundation stone laying ceremony of Sindh Madressatul Islam University, Malir Campus at the Education City was announced. This first phase of the development is expected to cost of Rs. 1.57 billion.

In April 2019, Ziauddin University initiated its second educational block in Education City, the first being its engineering faculty started in March 2018. The current block will contain the faculty of pharmacy and may accommodate up to 750 students. Ziauddin University is the first institution actually offering classes in the Education City.

The Sindh Madrassatul Islam University inaugurated its campus with the opening of its environment department on 25 October 2019. The University has allocated Rs1.57 billion for the construction of hostels, faculty blocks and the vice-chancellor's house, expected to be complete by 2021.

In a meeting on November 28, 2024, the Board of Directors of Education City Karachi approved the construction of roads and other facilities in the precinct. Also approved were:
– a Special Technology Zone of 374 acres
– a 45MW cheap power plant incorporating solar, wind and thermal power
