= Quaid-e-Azam Public School =

School in Karachi, Pakistan

Quaid-e-Azam Public School, Karachi is a not-for-profit boarding school located in Karachi, Pakistan. The school is run by the Sindh Madressah Board and is spread over 200-acre land.

It was founded in 1987 by Pakistani educationist Nisar Hassanally Effendi. The school provides education to poor boys and girls.
