= Nadra Panjwani =

Pakistani politician

Provincial Minister of Sindh
- In office 2007–2008

Nadra Panjwani is a Pakistani philanthropist and former caretaker provincial minister of Sindh who served in the 2007–08 caretaker ministry.

== Early life and career ==
She was born to a business family of Gujarati descent. She is a recipient of the Sitara-i-Imtiaz, the third highest civilian award in Pakistan. In 2004, Pakistani President Pervez Musharraf conferred Pakistan's second highest civilian award, the Hilal-i-Imtiaz, on Panjwani for her public service.

She is a sponsor of the Zainab Panjwani Memorial Hospital, Panjwani School/College for the Blind and the Dr. Panjwani Centre for Molecular Medicine and Drug Research at the University of Karachi in memory of her father, Dr. Mohammad Hussain Panjwani. She also supports Sindh Madressatul Islam University.
