= State Bank of Pakistan Museum & Art Gallery =

Numismatic museum and art gallerie in Karachi, Pakistan

- موزه و نمائش فن بینک دولت پاکستان
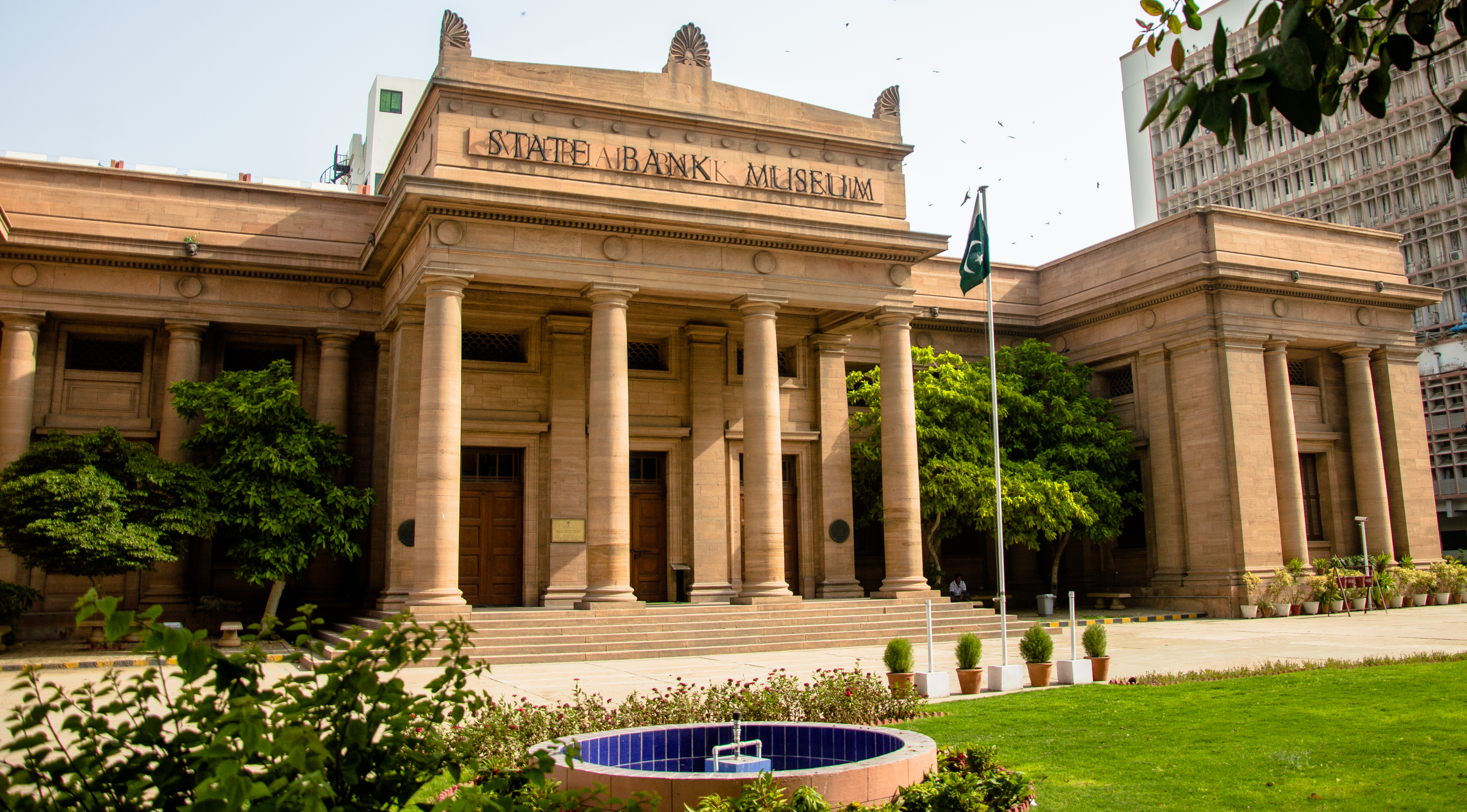
- Established: 2004
- Location: Karachi, Pakistan
- Director: Asma Ibrahim
- Owner: State Bank of Pakistan
- Website: State Bank of Pakistan Museum & Art Gallery

State Bank of Pakistan Museum & Art Gallery is a museum on Ibrahim Ismail Chundrigar Road in Karachi, established in 2004 to introduce the first Monetary Museum of Pakistan. The current State Bank of Pakistan Museum & Art Gallery building, previously the Imperial Bank of India, is a Greco Roman building in Jodhpuri Red Sandstone constructed in the 1920s by the British government. In 2004, the State Bank of Pakistan decided to adapt the building as a museum; work on the projects started in 2006 and was devoted to conservation of the building and acquisition of the collection.

== Collection ==
=== Coins Gallery ===
The Coins Gallery displays the techniques with some original dies of coin making in Pakistan Mint, also include some old machines, the process of coin making along some tools, and a documentary covering the whole process of coin minting in Pakistan Mint. The Coin Gallery is divided into two parts, Pre Islamic Gallery and Islamic Gallery till to the Present-Day period Coinage.

The Pre Islamic Gallery exhibition starting from barter system, seals used as coins by Indus valley people, punch-marked coins dated from 6th century B.C. The pre Islamic Gallery also displays some uncommon bar copper and silver coins, Indo Greeks including an uncommon bronze coin of Alexander the Great and several other unique coins, Indo Scythians, Indo Parthian, Kushans, Guptas, Indo Sassanians, Hindu Shahis.

The Islamic Gallery exhibition starts from the coinage of Arab Governors of Sindh, some uncommon Sultanate coins, Mughal coins, later Mughals, British Indian, and then coinage after 1947.

=== Currency Gallery ===
The Currency Gallery gives an overview of the origin of paper currency in the sub-continent, from early paper issues to polymer banknotes. The gallery of the museum displaying the history of Currency Notes in Pakistan and also includes the collection of historical, current and polymer banknotes of different countries around the world. The Currency Gallery includes the complete collection of Pakistani banknotes since its origination (1947–present).

== See also ==
- List of museums in Pakistan
