= The Cotton Exchange, Karachi =

Cotton trading exchange in Pakistan

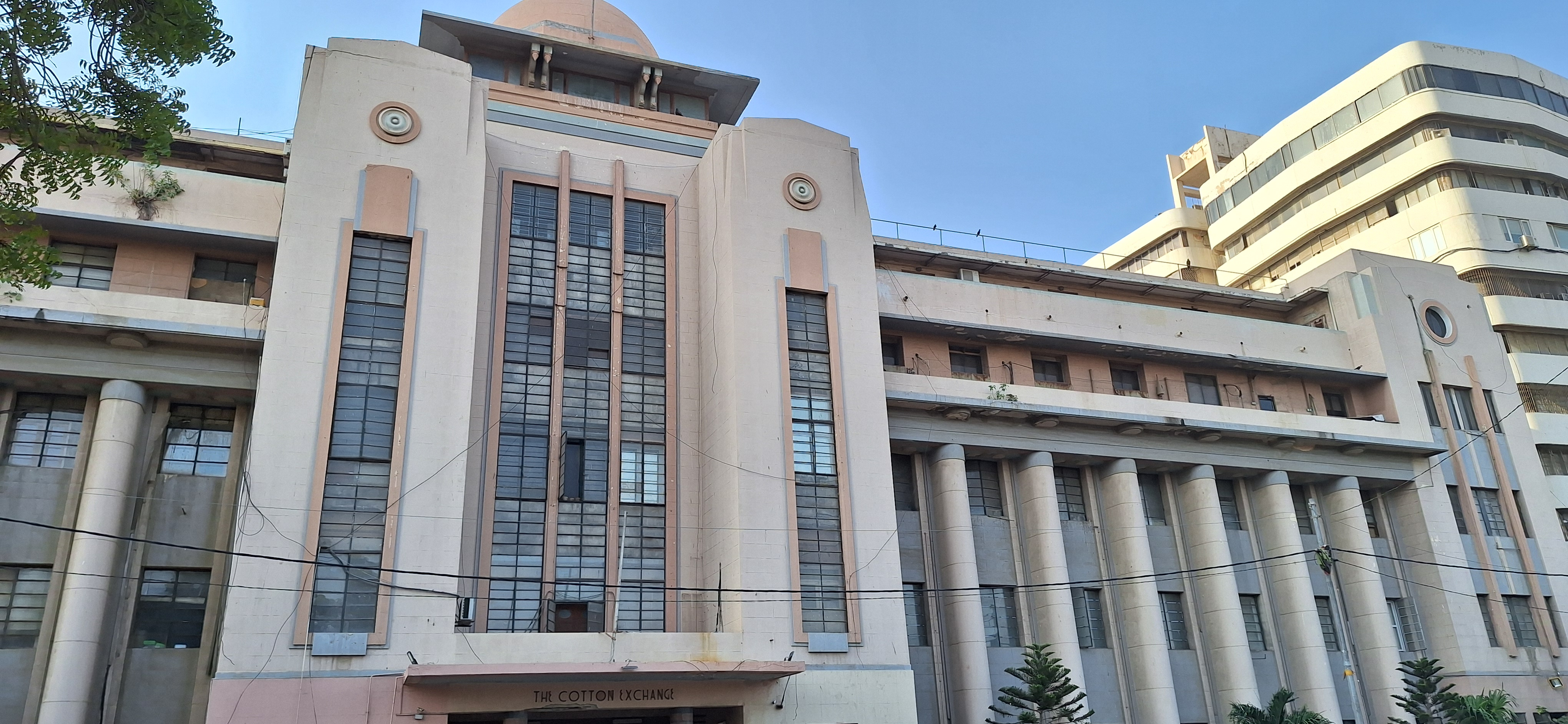
The Cotton Exchange on I.I. Chundrigar Road in Karachi

The Cotton Exchange, Karachi is located on I.I. Chundrigar Road in Karachi, Sindh, Pakistan. It is the largest cotton trading exchange in Pakistan.

== History ==
Founded in 1933, it is the oldest commodity exchange in Pakistan.

== Building ==
The exterior of the structure has remained intact over time. The façade is as beautiful as it was when it was initially built. There are small indications of wear and tear, but the interiors have not changed considerably. The unchanged furnishings, slow-moving ceiling fans, and historic portraits that adorn the building's walls preserve its authenticity.

In December 2025, the Federal Investigation Agency and the Evacuee Trust Property Board secured and sealed the building in a "joint operation" declaring it a federal trust property.

== See also ==
- Karachi Stock Exchange
- List of South Asian stock exchanges
