= Merewether Clock Tower =

Coordinates: 24°50.936′N 66°59.845′E

- برج میری ویدر
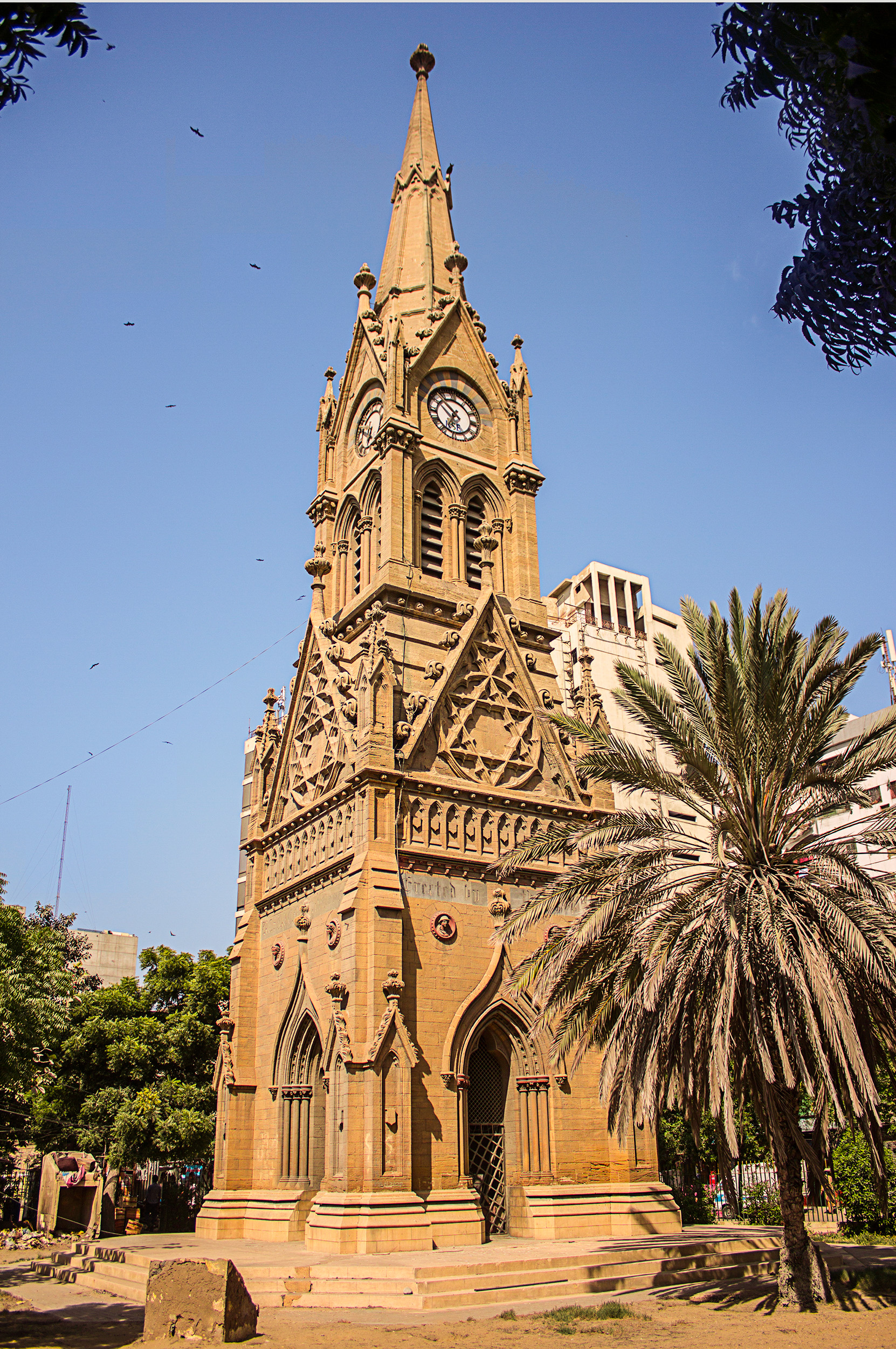

General information
- Type: Memorial and clocktower
- Architectural style: Gothic Revival
- Location: Serai Quarter, Karachi, Pakistan
- Named for: Sir William Lockyer Merewether
- Construction started: 1884
- Opened: 1892

Height
- Height: 31 m

Design and construction
- Structural engineer: James Strachan

Merewether Clock Tower or Merewether Tower (Urdu: برج میری ویدر) is a neo-Gothic clocktower built during the Victorian era in Karachi, Pakistan. The tower is a landmark in central Karachi, and is at the termini of two of the most important roads in central Karachi: Muhammad Ali Jinnah Road and I. I. Chundrigar Road. The tower used to mark the boundary of the city when arriving from the port at Kiamari, and marked the dividing line between Karachi's Old Town and its newer European quarters to the east. It currently is the westernmost point of the Serai Quarter.

== History ==
Merewether Tower was raised by public subscription as a memorial for Sir William L. Merewether, who served as Commissioner of Sindh from 1867 to 1877. Designed by James Strachan, the Municipal Engineer of Karachi, the foundation stone was laid by the Governor of Bombay, Sir James Fergusson in 1884. It was formally opened to the public in 1892 by the Commissioner in Sind, Sir Evan James, at a total cost of 37,178 rupees.

== Architecture ==
Strachan designed the tower in the Gothic Revival style popular in Victorian England, to evoke the architecture of Medieval England (11th to 15th century CE). The architecture takes the form of an Eleanor cross.

The clocktower stands on a base of 4.09 square metres and rises to a height of 31 metres . 4 clocks are situated at a height of 21.3 metres on each facade, with a bell that weighs 136 kilograms that strikes on the hour. Smaller bells weighing 45 kilograms strike on the quarter-hour.

It is made of local Gizri sandstone, and Star of David is also visible on its exterior. The tower is decorated with delicate stonework, which was carved by stonemasons of the Silawat community, who are also known as Gazdars.

== Significance ==
The tower used to mark the southern extent of the city when arriving from the port in Kiamari along Napier Mole Road. It also serves as a marker of the dividing line between the Old Town from the new European Serai Quarters. It is also located at the termini of two major thoroughfares: Muhammad Ali Jinnah Road and I. I. Chundrigar Road, and is a major bus-stop.

== See also ==
- List of clock towers in Pakistan
