= Union Bank (Pakistan) =

Defunct bank in Pakistan

- Type: Public
- Industry: Banking
- Founded: 1991
- Defunct: 2006
- Fate: Acquired
- Successor: Standard Chartered
- Headquarters: Karachi, Pakistan
- Products: Loans, Credit Cards, Savings, Consumer Banking etc.
- Total assets: US$2 Billion (2006)

Union Bank was a Pakistani private bank based in Karachi. It was established in 1991 with its headquarters in Lahore, Pakistan. In 2000 the bank relocated its headquarters to Karachi. It was acquired in a merger by Standard Chartered Bank in 2006.

Prior to the merger, it was Pakistan's eighth largest bank and had 65 branches in 22 cities, about US$2 billion in assets, and about 400,000 customers.

== History ==
In 2000, Union Bank acquired Bank of America's operations in Pakistan. Then in July 2001, Union Bank signed an Independent Operator agreement for American Express Cards in Pakistan. In June 2002, Union Bank acquired 10 branches of Emirates Bank in Pakistan for $18 million.

In 2006, Standard Chartered Bank acquired 81% of Union Bank's shares for US$413 million. Under Pakistani law, it had to delist Union Bank and make an offer for the outstanding shares; the offer raised the total purchase price to about US$511. On 30 December 2006, Standard Chartered merged Union Bank with its own subsidiary in Pakistan, which had 46 branches in 10 cities. The merged bank was named Standard Chartered Bank (Pakistan) and is now Pakistan's sixth largest bank.

== See also ==
- Standard Chartered Pakistan
