= Pakistan Mint =

Coin manufacturing industry of Pakistan

- Native name: پاکستان ٹکسال
- Type: Public
- Industry: Coins; Medals
- Founded: 1943; 83 years ago
- Headquarters: Shalimar Tehsil, Lahore, Pakistan
- Area served: Pakistan
- Products: Coins
- Website: pakistanmint.gov.pk

The Pakistan Mint is the Pakistan's official maker of Pakistani coins. It is currently located in Shalimar Tehsil, Lahore District.

== History ==
The Pakistan Mint was founded in September 1943 as His Majesty's Mint when, during World War II, the British Indian government relocated mint operations from Calcutta to Lahore in response to Japanese bombing. After the partition of India in 1947, the mint was renamed Pakistan Mint.

In 2003, the Federal Investigation Agency uncovered a Rs. 26 million fraud at the Pakistan Mint, implicating Mint Master Riaz Hasan Khan, Works Manager Raja Fayyaz Anwar, and Deputy Secretary Muhammad Younis. The probe was launched on the orders of the Lahore High Court after a complaint from the lowest bidder for supplying copper and nickel. According to the FIA, during 2001–2002 the accused colluded with a local supplier to award contracts at inflated prices, despite the mint's existing metal stocks. The inquiry found that they bypassed mandatory price comparisons with the London Metal Exchange, accepted substandard materials, and concealed procurement details. The FIA report alleged Riaz Hasan Khan received Rs. 5.5 million to favor a non-specialist firm, resulting in losses to the state exchequer and possible tax evasion by the supplier's chief executive.

== Products ==
Pakistan Mint has been manufacturing not only coins or currency for the state with denominations of 1, 2, 5 and 10. It also manufactures medals and awards for the Armed Forces, postal seals and stamps.
