= Standard Chartered Pakistan =

Bank of Pakistan

Standard Chartered Bank (Pakistan) Limited (SCBPL)

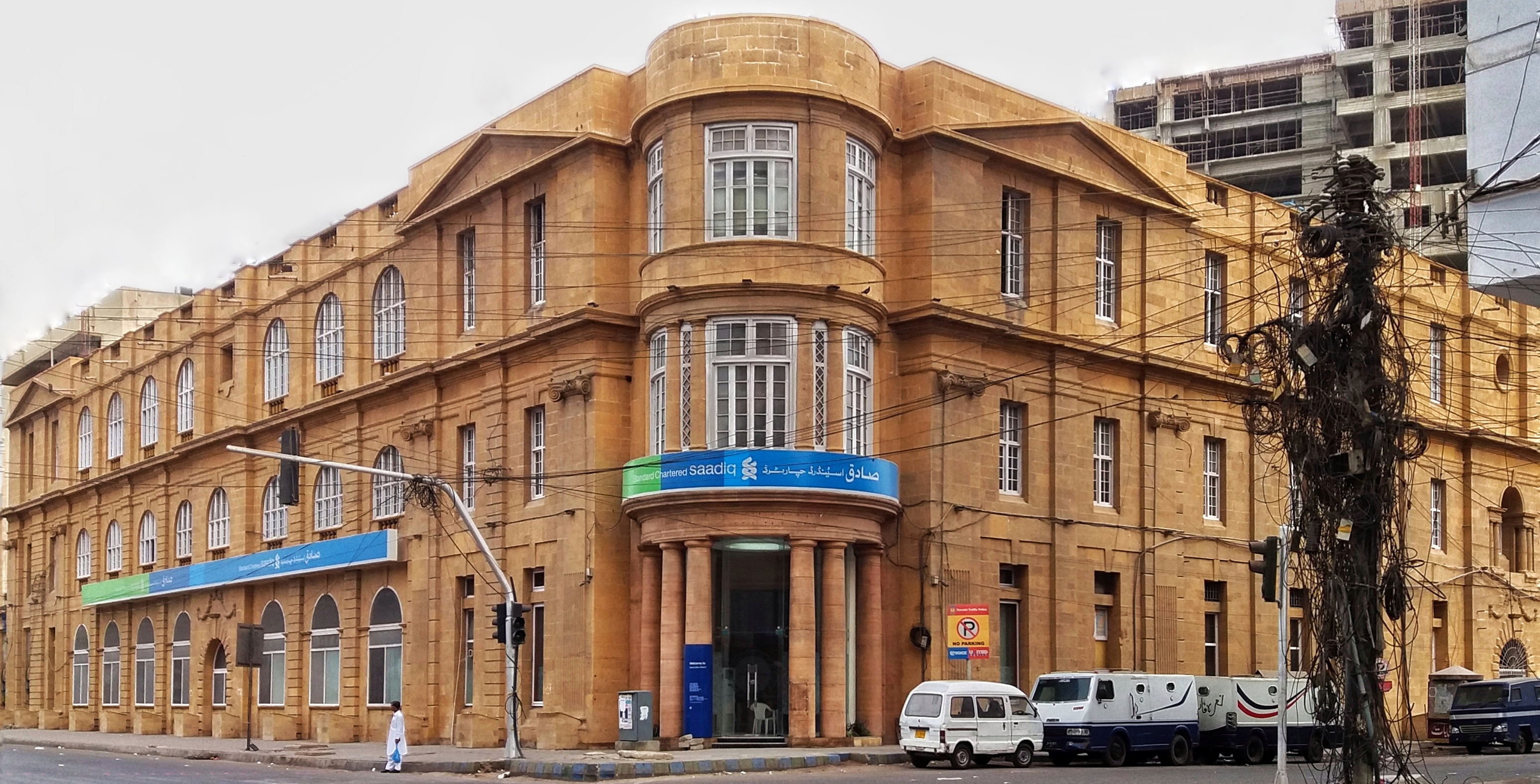
- Headquarters of Standard Chartered Bank in Karachi
- Native name: سٹینڈرڈ چارٹرڈ بینک (پاکستان) محدود (SCBPL)
- Type: Public
- Traded as: PSX: SCBPL; KSE 100 component
- Industry: Banking
- Founded: March 1863; 163 years ago
- Headquarters: Principal Office; Karachi-74000, Pakistan
- Key people: Rehan Muhammad Shaikh CEO
- Products: Loans, credit cards, debit cards, savings, consumer banking, business banking, and Islamic banking
- Revenue: ▼ Rs. 80.55 billion (US$290 million) (2025)
- Operating income: ▼ Rs. 58.49 billion (US$210 million) (2025)
- Net income: ▼ Rs. 28.78 billion (US$100 million) (2025)
- Total assets: ▼ Rs. 872.87 billion (US$3.1 billion) (2025)
- Total equity: ▼ Rs. 110.46 billion (US$400 million) (2025)
- Number of employees: 1,842 (2025)
- Parent: Standard Chartered
- Website: sc.com/pk

Standard Chartered Pakistan is a Pakistani commercial bank headquartered in Karachi. It is a wholly owned subsidiary of British multinational bank Standard Chartered and is one of the oldest foreign commercial bank in Pakistan.

== History ==
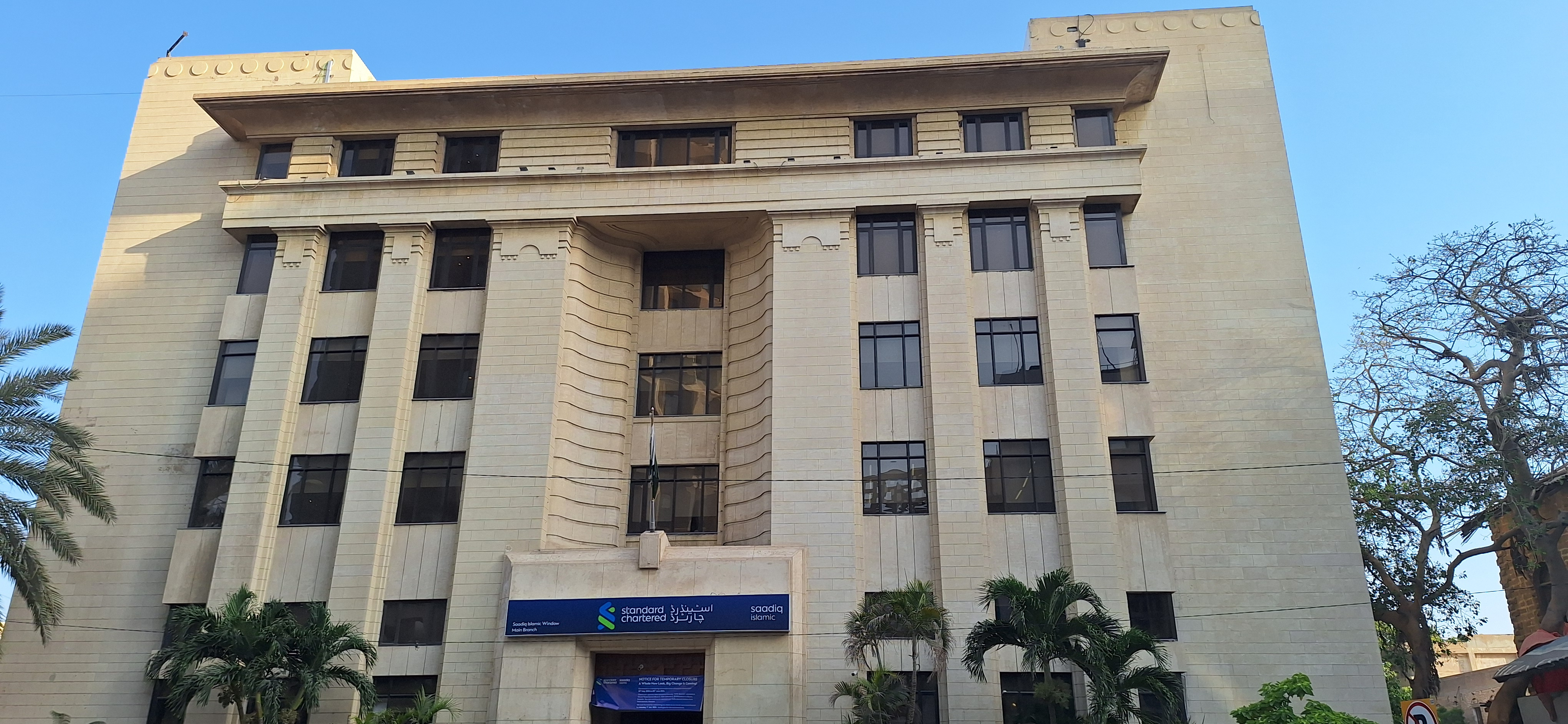
Standard Chartered Saadiq headquarters on I.I. Chundrigar Road in Karachi

The history of Standard Chartered in Pakistan dates back to 1863, when the Chartered Bank was founded in London in 1853 after Scottish businessman James Wilson obtained a royal charter from Queen Victoria. The bank commenced operations in 1858 with branches in Bombay, Calcutta and Shanghai, and added Hong Kong and Singapore the following year. In March 1863, it opened an office in the port city of Karachi, at the time a growing trading hub in the Sindh region of British India, making it the oldest financial institution in what would later become Pakistan. The Karachi office was established primarily to finance the cotton and commodity trade flowing between Sindh and Britain through Karachi port.

Following the partition of British India on 14 August 1947, the Chartered Bank continued operating in the new Dominion of Pakistan from its Karachi office. With Karachi serving as Pakistan's first capital, the bank's local facilities handled government accounts, refugee remittances, and trade settlements during the early post-independence years. Expansion in this period was modest, as Pakistan's developing banking sector prioritised the establishment of domestic institutions and the founding of the State Bank of Pakistan in 1948. In 1969, the Chartered Bank merged globally with the Standard Bank of British South Africa to form Standard Chartered Bank, and the Karachi operations were renamed accordingly.

In December 2002, Grindlays ANZ's operations in Pakistan were merged into Standard Chartered Bank Pakistan. The merger followed Standard Chartered Bank's acquisition of Grindlays' Middle Eastern and South Asian operations from ANZ Banking Group on July 31, 2000. At the time of the merger, Standard Chartered was the largest foreign bank in Pakistan and operated in all four provinces, maintaining a network of 21 branches.

In 2006, Standard Chartered Bank acquired Union Bank in Pakistan. On 30 December 2006, Standard Chartered merged Union Bank with its own subsidiary, Standard Chartered Bank (Pakistan), to create Pakistan's sixth largest bank.

== FinCEN ==
Standard Chartered was named in FinCEN leak, published by Buzzfeed News and the International Consortium of Investigative Journalists (ICIJ). It had four suspicious transactions flagged.

== See also ==
- Banking in Pakistan
- Union Bank (Pakistan)
