= Sindh Madressatul Islam University =

Historical Institute in Karachi, Sindh

Coordinates: 24.8507796°N 67.0040286°E

Sindh Madressatul Islam University (SMIU)
- سندھ مدرسۃ الاسلام
- Motto in English: Enter To Learn Go Forth to Serve
- Type: Public
- Established: 1 September 1885 (as a school); 2012 (university status)
- Affiliations: Higher Education Commission (Pakistan), chartered by the Government of Sindh
- Chancellor: Governor of Sindh
- Vice-Chancellor: Prof. Dr. Mujeebuddin Sahrai Memon
- Location: Aiwan-e-Tijarat Road, Serai Quarter, Karachi, Sindh, Pakistan
- Campus: 8 acres
- Website: smiu.edu.pk

Sindh Madressatul Islam University (SMI University; Urdu: سندھ مدرسۃ الاسلام; Sindhi: سنڌ مدرسۃ الاسلام) is a university in Karachi, Sindh, Pakistan. Founded in 1885, it is one of the oldest educational institutions in South Asia.

== History ==
Sindh Madrasa was founded on 1 September 1885 by Hassan Ali Effendi, a Sindhi who settled in Karachi. The originally "kafila serai" grounds of pre-colonial Karachi that were located to the east of Mithadar eventually incorporated into the school grounds

Its establishment was supported by Indian Muslim jurists including Syed Ahmad Khan and Syed Ameer Ali. It became a popular school for many Muslims of Sindh and Balochistan. Modeled after a British public school, Sindh Madrasa remained a high school until 1943 when it was elevated to a college, and in February 2012 was chartered as a university by the Government of Sindh.

Today, Sindh Madrasa is a publicly funded university located in the Serai Quarter of downtown Karachi, near Habib Bank Plaza building and I. I. Chundrigar Road on an eight-acre estate which is home to several colonial era buildings most of them designed by architect James Strachan. Sindh Madressatul Islam University offers four year undergraduate programs and two year master's degrees, however doesn't award doctorate's. As of 2013, this university has 16 faculty members with PhD degrees teaching there. The university is constructing a 15-floor academic tower in its current campus. The institute has been associated with several prominent South Asian Muslims including Pakistan's founding father and first head of state Mohammad Ali Jinnah who received his matriculation from the school in 1892, apart from Jinnah, Muhammad Hashim Gazdar (9th Mayor of Karachi), Shah Nawaz Bhutto, Abdullah Haroon, Ghulam Hussain Hidayatullah and Muhammad Ayub Khuhro also studied here.

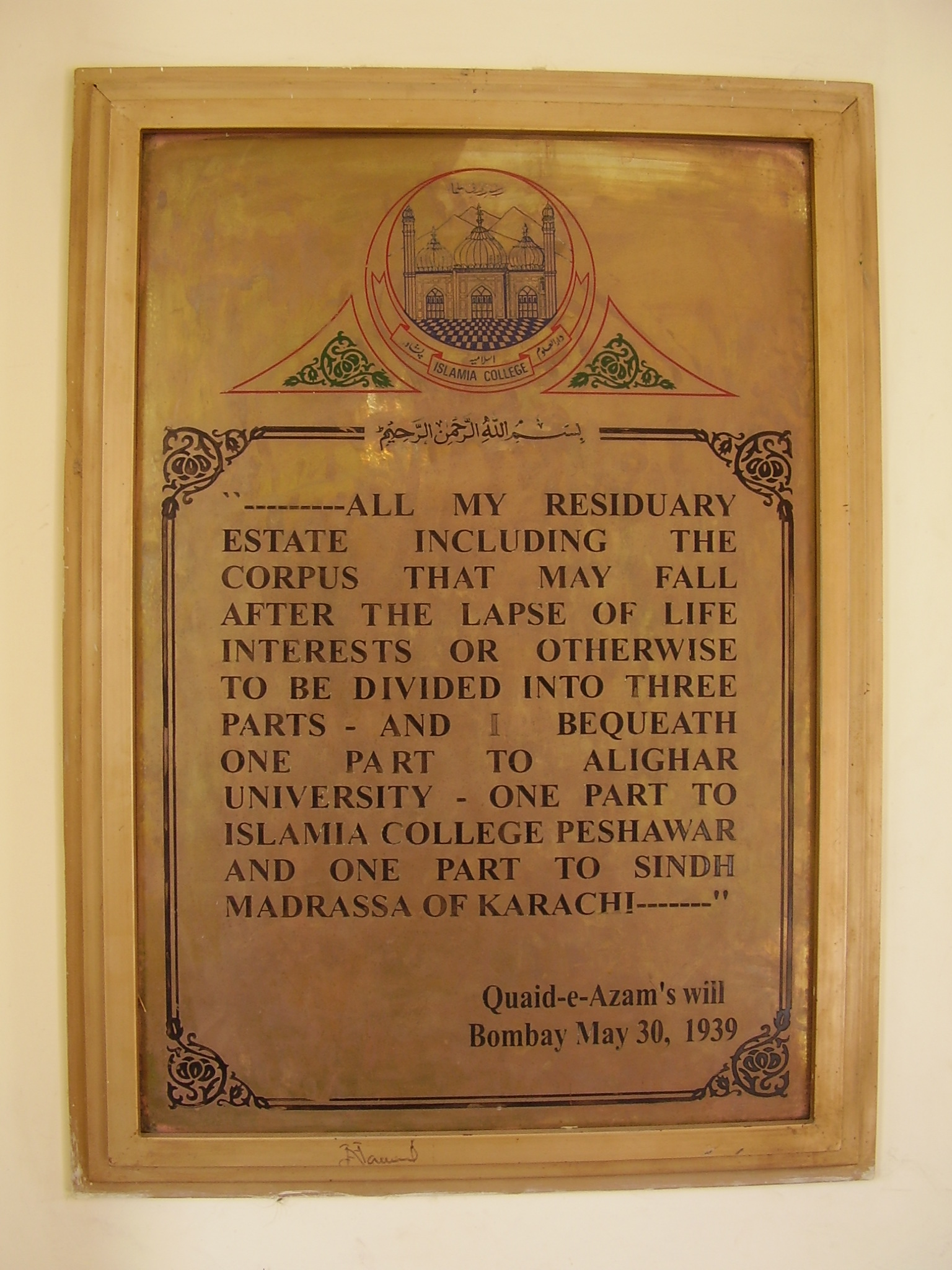
Muhammad Ali Jinnah's will, excerpt

== Jinnah's last will ==
Muhammad Ali Jinnah studied there from 1887 to 1892 and received his basic education there. He loved his alma mater so much that he left one-third of his personal property to it through his last will. Jinnah was delighted to come to the event where the school's status was raised to the level of a college in June 1943.

== Academics ==
- Department of Business Administration
- Department of Accounting and Banking Finance
- Department of Computer Science
- Department of Artificial Intelligence and Mathematical Sciences
- Department of Software Engineering
- Department of Education
- Department of Environmental Sciences
- Department of Media and Communication Studies
- Department of English
- Department of Social Development

The department offers the following degree programs:

- BBA (Finance, Human Resource Management, Marketing)
- BS (Accounting and Finance, Education, English, Software Engineering, Computer Science, Artificial Intelligence)
- B.Ed (1.5 Years, 2 Years, 4 Years)
- MBA (3.5 years) ((Finance, Human Resource Management, Marketing),
- MBA (2-2.5 years) ((Finance, Human Resource Management, Marketing),
- MBA (1.5 years) ((Finance, Human Resource Management, Marketing),
- MS (Computer Science)
- MS (Education)
- MS (Management Sciences & Public Administration)
- MS (Public Administration)
- Ph.D. in Computer Science (3 Years Program)
- Ph.D. in Media Science (3 Years Program)
- Ph.D. in Education (3 Years Program)

The department offers nationally and internationally recognized programs at both the graduate and undergraduate levels, designed in consultation with the corporate sector. It is located in Karachi's Business District, near I.I. Chundrigar Road, often referred to as the Wall Street of Karachi. Most multinational and national trading houses, banks, financial institutions, and the Karachi Chamber of Commerce and Industry are within walking distance of the department. Living in this 'Business Environment' is one of the advantages that Business Administration students at SMIU enjoy, along with opportunities for internships. As a public-sector institution, SMIU charges minimal fees, approximately one-sixth of what other comparable institutions charge for business education programs.

The department offers the following programs:

- BS (Computer Science)
- MS (Computer Science)
- Phd (Computer Science)

It is equipped with three computer labs: two are computing laboratories, while the other is a hardware laboratory that offers courses in electronic and digital circuit design. The computers are connected through a network.

IT/Industrial Hub: SMIU is situated in an area where numerous IT industries, software houses, institutions, media organizations, and government networks are located. This environment enables students to seek internships and become familiar with IT-related fields.

The department offers the following programs:

- BS Education- 4 years
- Associate Degree in Education – 2 years
- MS Education – 2 years

The department has access to SMIU Model School for practical training of the students of its graduate and undergraduate programs.

The department offers the following programs:

- BS Environmental Sciences
- MS Environmental Sciences

The department offers the following programs:

- BS (Media Studies)
- BS (Social Sciences)
- MS (Media Studies)
- MS (Social Sciences)

The university is situated in an area where leading media outlets, both print and electronic, such as Daily Dawn, Daily Jang, and The News, as well as nearly all major satellite television networks, are located. The department features a television studio and an FM radio station, offering opportunities for hands-on training with broadcasting equipment.

== Selected notable alumni ==
- Muhammad Ali Jinnah
- Abdullah Haroon
- Muhammad Altaf bharo patni Bin Yousuf patni
- Khan Bahadur Ghulam Nabi Kazi
- Allah Baksh Sarshar Uqaili
- Hassan Ali Effendi
- Ghulam Hussain Hidayatullah
- Allama Ali Khan Abro
- Syed Gulam Mustafa Shah
- Rasul Bux Palejo
- Shah Nawaz Bhutto

== See also ==
- List of Islamic educational institutions
- List of schools in Karachi
- List of universities in Pakistan
