= I. I. Chundrigar Road =

Major road in Karachi, Pakistan

I. I. Chundrigar Road آئی آئی چندریگر روڈ
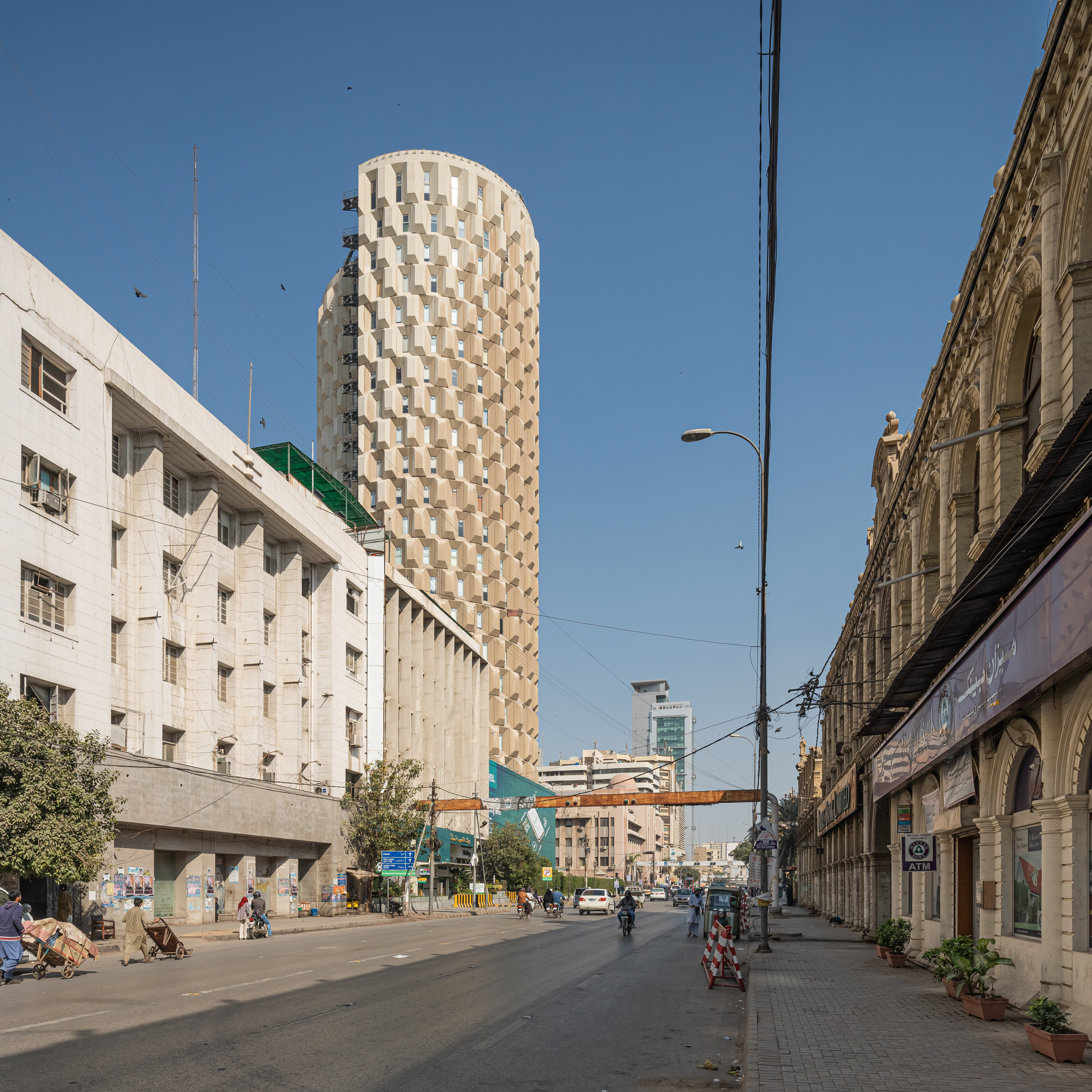
- I. I. Chundrigar Road forms Karachi's historic central business district
- Interactive map of I. I. Chundrigar Road آئی آئی چندریگر روڈ
- Former name: McLeod Road
- Namesake: Ibrahim Ismail Chundrigar, the sixth Prime Minister of Pakistan
- Length: 2.2 km (1.4 mi)
- Location: Karachi, Pakistan
- Coordinates: 24.848870026285976°N 66.99850726645714°E
- West end: Merewether Tower
- East end: Intersection of Ingle Road, Elander Road, and Dr. Ziauddin Road (Katchery Road)

Other
- Known for: being "Pakistan's Wall Street"

I. I. Chundrigar Road (Urdu: آئی آئی چندریگر روڈ), previously known as McLeod Road, is a road located in central business district of Karachi, Pakistan, and is named after former Pakistani Prime Minister Ibrahim Ismail Chundrigar. The road serves as the spine of Pakistan's largest financial centre, and is frequently referred to as "Pakistan's Wall Street". It is oriented on an east–west basis and links Dr. Ziauddin Ahmed Road in the east to Merewether Tower in the west.

The Karachi Stock Exchange, now consolidated as part of the Pakistan Stock Exchange, is headquartered here along with the largest banks, namely Habib Bank, United Bank, National Bank, Standard Chartered's Pakistani subsidiary and the State Bank – the nation's central bank. It is also the headquarters of media companies Hum Network and Geo News.

== History ==
The road was originally named McLeod Road (میکلوڈ روڈ), in honour of John McLeod, Deputy Collector of Customs in Karachi in the 1850s. Another theory suggests it was named in honour of James John McLeod Innes, a recipient of the Victoria Cross, for his services to the Crown during the 1857 Mutiny. Several cotton warehouses were established facing the railway line behind the street during a cotton boom in the region after the American Civil War, with their offices along the street itself. By the 1870s, a number of European banks and companies were established along the street. In the 1870s, a small railway station was built along the southern edge of the road, which was upgraded in the 1880s, and again in 1935 with the construction of the McLeod Station, now the Karachi City railway station.

In 1963, the Habib Bank Plaza was built along the street, which remained the tallest building of Pakistan until 2005, when the MCB Tower, which was also built on the road, was completed. On 9 November 1969, the street was renamed Ibrahim Ismail Chundrigar Road, after the 6th prime minister of Pakistan.

== Gallery ==
The following are heritage buildings along I.I. Chundrigar Road which are protected by the Government of Sindh.

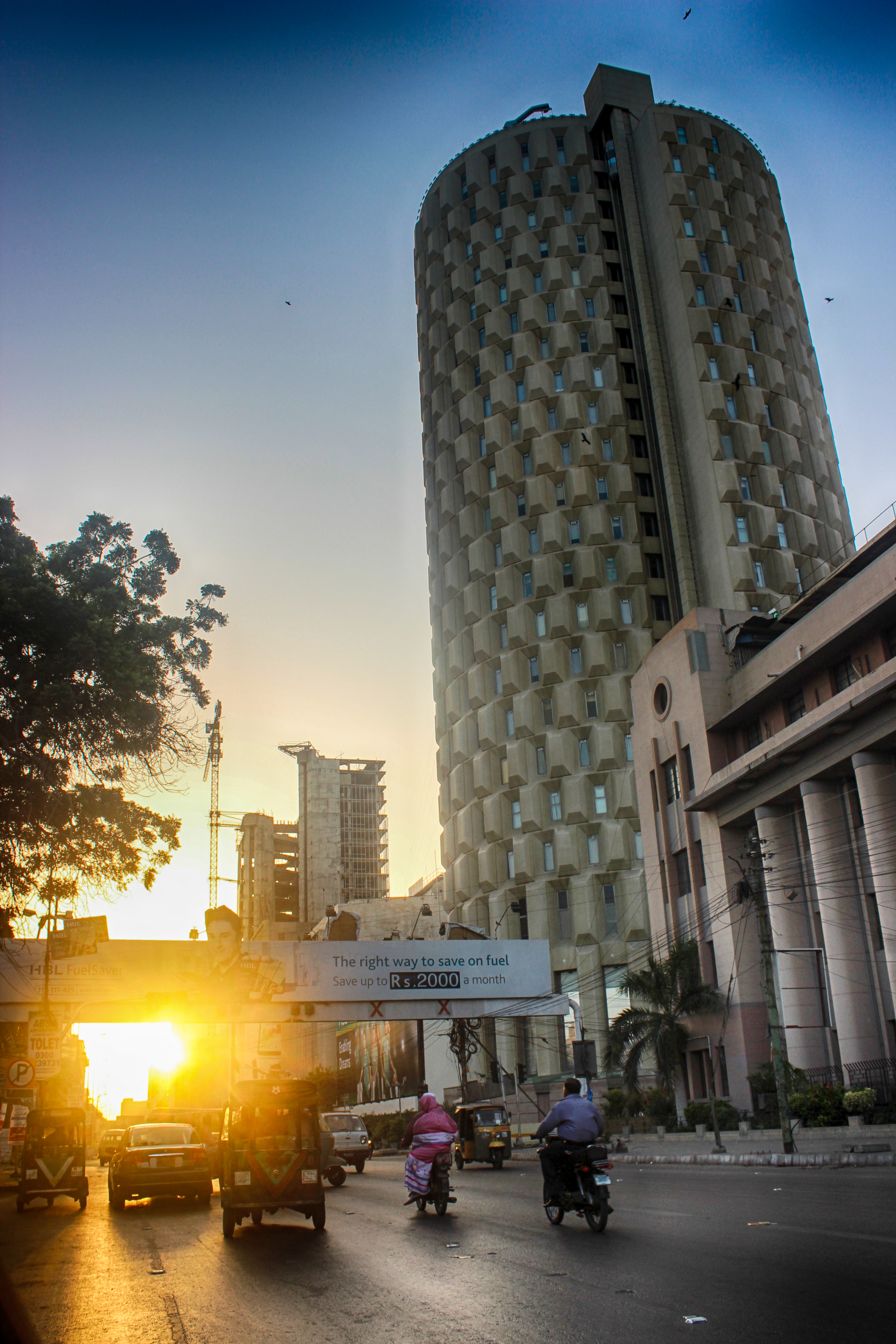
Habib Bank Plaza, built in 1963, was once the tallest building in South Asia

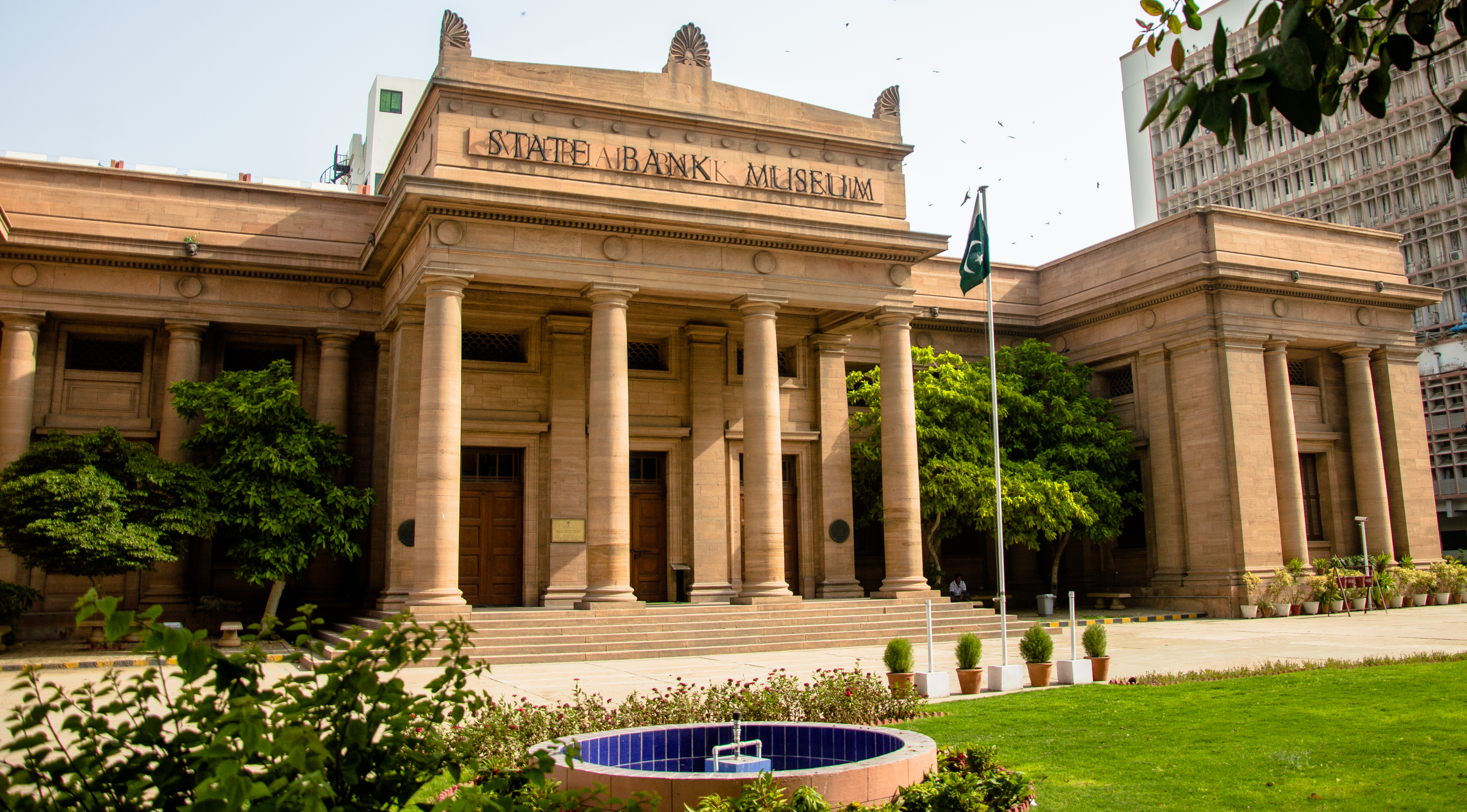
The historic State Bank of Pakistan building now serves as the State Bank of Pakistan Museum

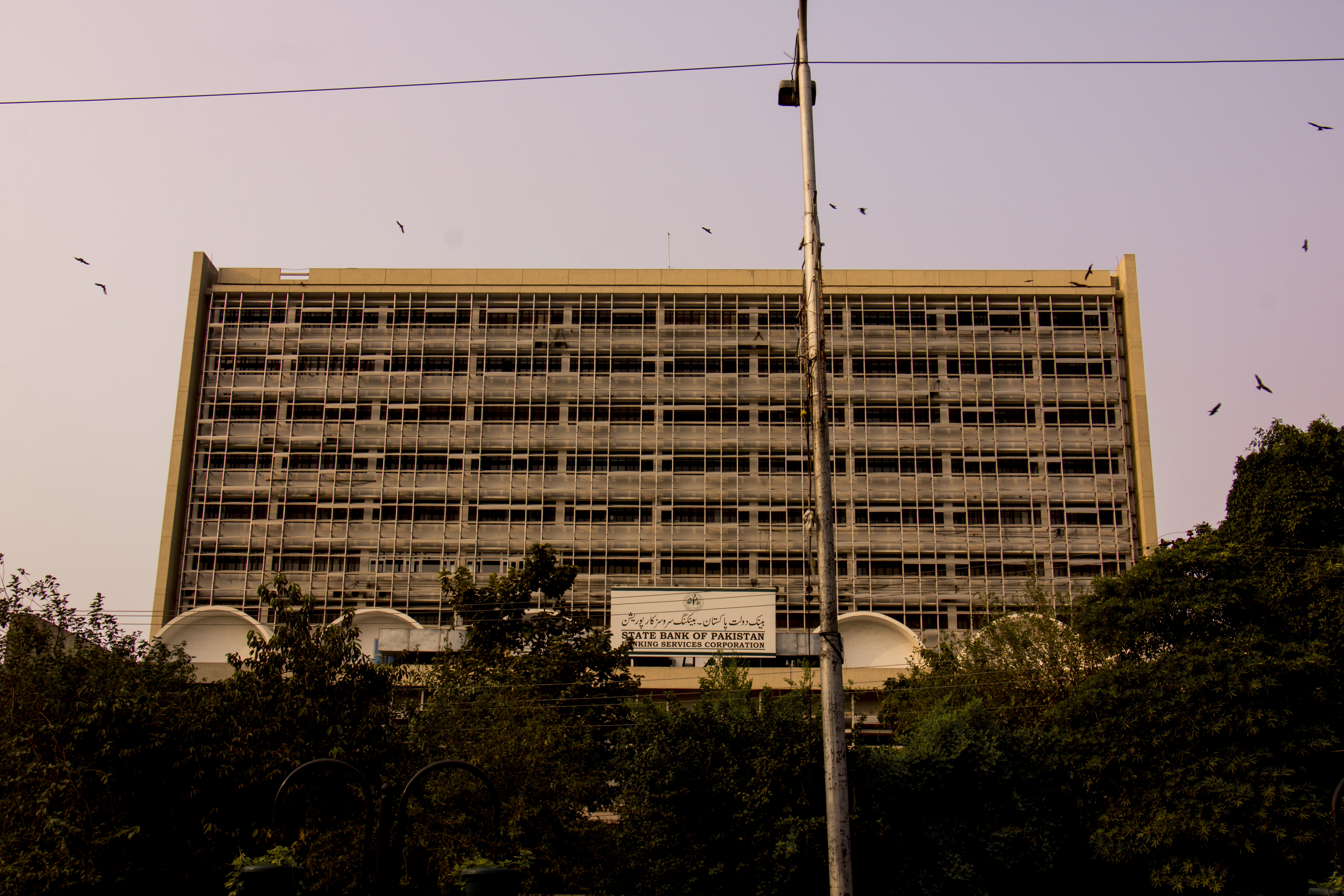
The midcentury building of the new State Bank of Pakistan complex

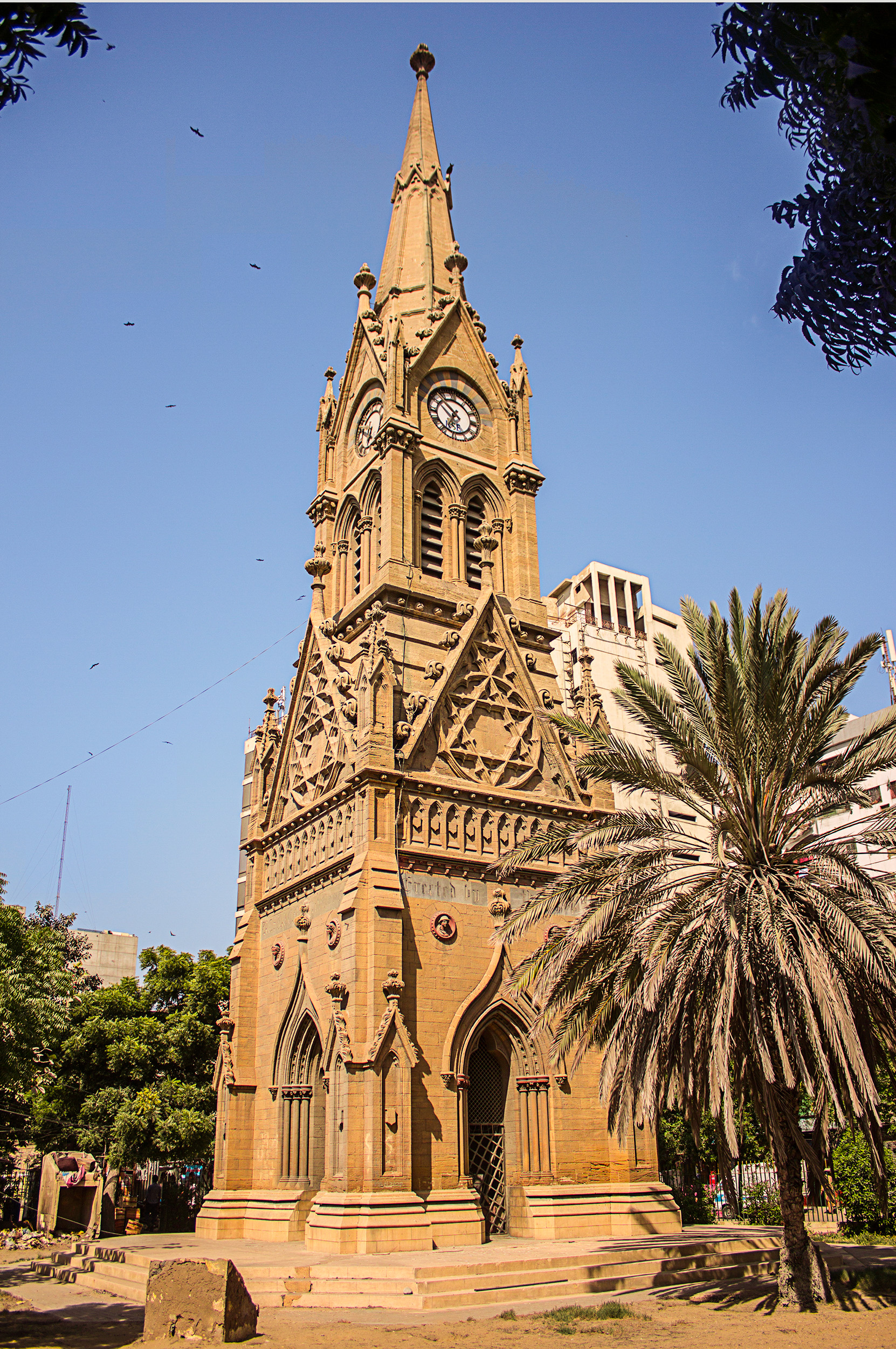
Merewether Clock Tower is at the western terminus of the road

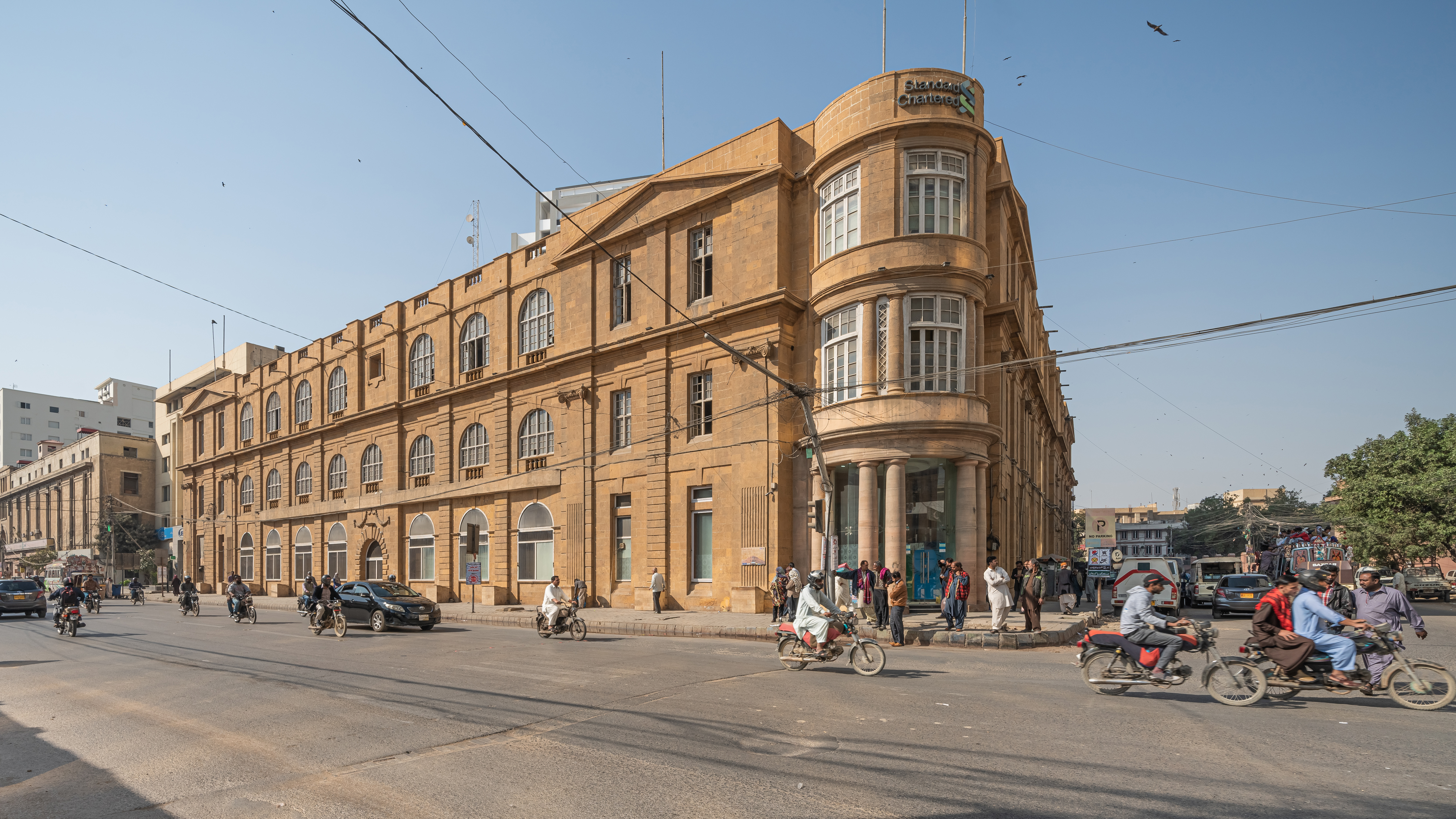
Historic headquarters of the Standard Chartered Pakistan

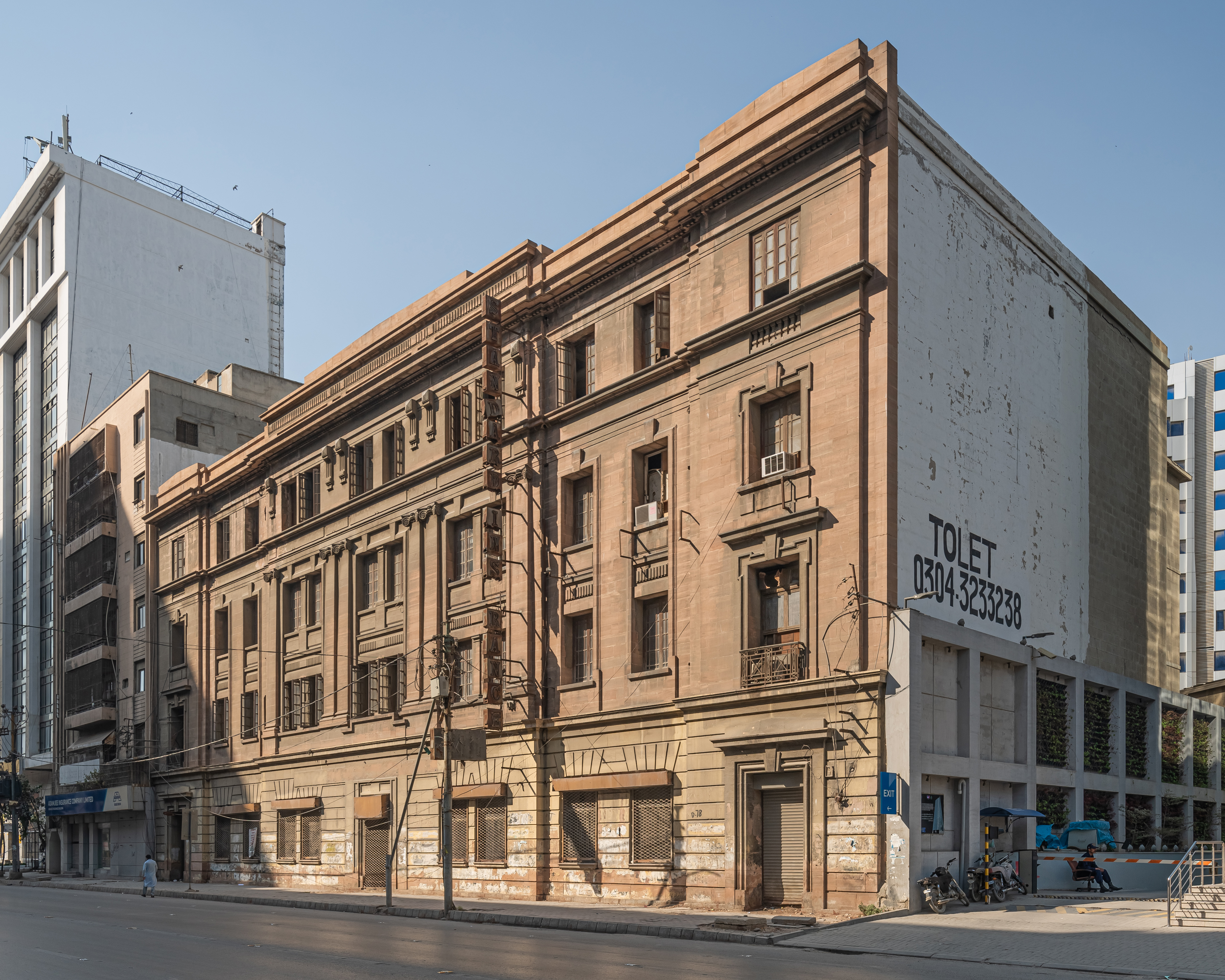
Standard Insurance House, built in 1905

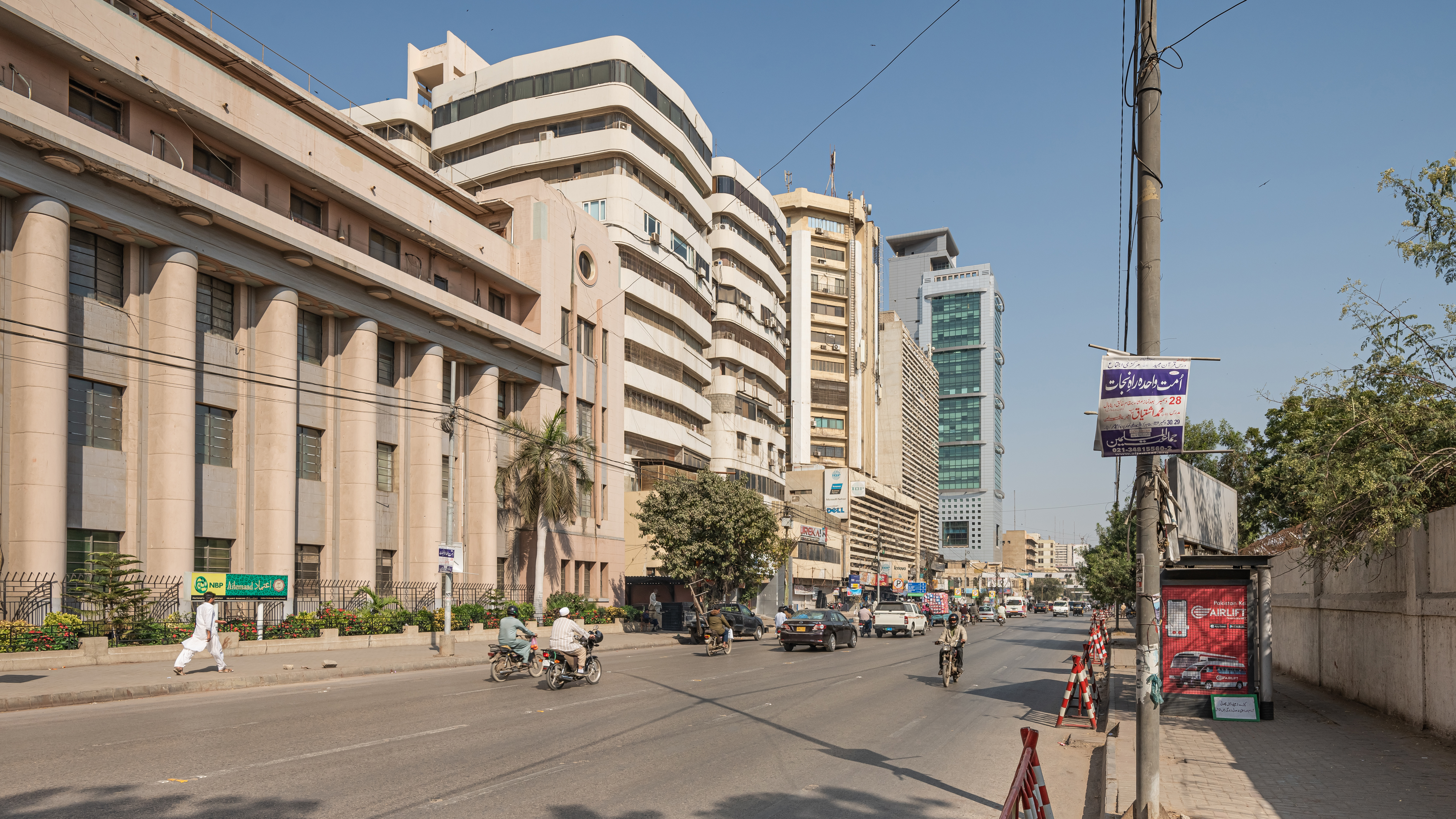
Looking east towards the MCB Tower, with the historic Karachi Cotton Exchange on the left

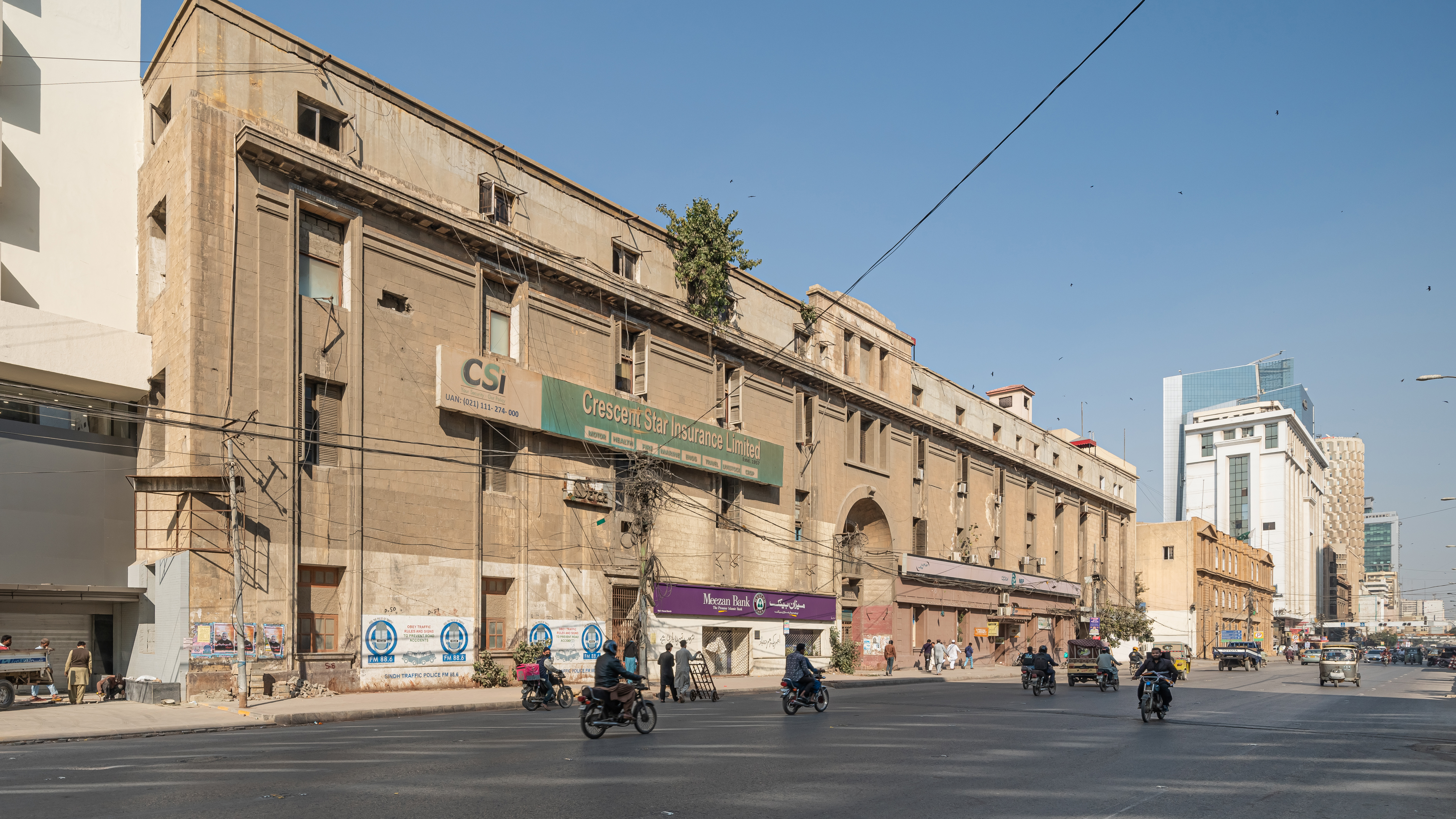
Nadir House

== See also ==
- List of streets of Karachi
