= Mirror (disambiguation) =

A mirror is an object whose surface reflects an image.

Mirror, mirrors or MIRROR may also refer to:

- Reflection (mathematics), creating the mirror image of a shape across a point, line or plane
- The "silver mirror", created in chemical tests involving Tollens' reagent
- Current mirror, an electric circuit designed to copy a current through one active device by controlling the current in another active device of a circuit
- Magnetic mirror, a magnetic field configuration
- Acoustic mirror, a device used to focus and amplify sound waves

== Geography ==
- Mirror, Alberta, a place in Canada
- Mirror Lakes, a set of lakes in New Zealand

== Computing ==
- Mirror site, an Internet server which replicates content available elsewhere
- Mirror (programming), a type of reflection mechanism in programming

== Books and publications ==
- Mirrors, novel by Naguib Mahfouz
- Mirror (Yi Sang poem), 1933 poem by Yi Sang
- Mirror, a short poem by American author Sylvia Plath
- Daily Mirror, a newspaper based in the United Kingdom
- Montreal Mirror, an alternative weekly newspaper based in Quebec, Canada
- Mumbai Mirror, a compact daily newspaper based in Mumbai, India
- Mirror (Pakistani magazine), a Pakistani social magazine published from 1951 to 1972
- Australian Woman's Mirror, an Australian weekly magazine published from 1924 to 1961
- The Mirror (Western Australia), published from 1921 until 1956

== Film ==
- Mirror Releasing, now United Artists Releasing, a film distribution company
- Mirror (1947 film), a French crime film directed by Raymond Lamy
- Mirror (1975 film), a Russian art film directed by Andrei Tarkovsky
- Mirrors (1978 film), a horror film by Noel Black
- Mirrors (2007 film), a Canadian short drama film
- Mirrors (2008 film), a supernatural horror film starring Kiefer Sutherland

== TV ==
- "Mirror", a 2008 episode from the television series Legend of the Seeker
- Mirror, a 2007 television ident for BBC Two

== Music ==
=== Bands and group projects ===
- Mirror (multimedia project), a multimedia project created by Thomas Anselmi
- Mirror (group), a Hong Kong boy band
- Mirrors (Ohio band), an early 1970s proto-punk/psychedelic garage band from Cleveland, OH
- Mirrors (band), a synthpop band from Brighton

=== Albums ===
- Mirror (Emitt Rhodes album), 1971
- Mirror (Graham Central Station album), 1976
- Mirror, a 1988 album by One 2 Many
- Mirror (The Rapture album), 1999
- Mirror (D'espairsRay album), 2007
- Mirror, a 2008 album by I'm Not a Gun
- Mirror (Charles Lloyd album), 2009
- Mirror (Jacky Terrasson album), 2007
- Mirrors (Blue Öyster Cult album), or the title song
- Mirrors (Peggy Lee album), 1975
- Mirrors (Sandra album), 1986
- Mirrors (Joe Chambers album), 1999
- Mirrors (Misery Signals album), or its title song, "Mirrors"
- Mirrors EP, a 2009 EP by alternative rock band Young Guns
- Mirrors, a 2006 album by Miki Furukawa
- Mirror (Lauren Spencer-Smith album), 2023
- Mirror, a 1991 album by Revolutionary Army of the Infant Jesus

=== Songs ===
- "Mirror" (Gackt song), 2000
- "Mirror" (Lil Wayne song), 2011
- "Mirror" (Porter Robinson song), 2020
- "Mirror" (Sigrid song), 2021
- "Mirror" (Ado song), 2024
- "Mirror" (Kid Phenomenon song), 2026
- "Mirrors" (Natalia Kills song), 2010
- "Mirrors" (Justin Timberlake song), 2013
- "Mirrors" (Tohoshinki song), 2019
- "Mirror", by Bazzi from the album Cosmic, 2018
- ”Mirror”, by SoMo from the album The Answers, 2017
- ”Mirror”, a 2013 song by Ellie Goulding from The Hunger Games: Catching Fire
- "Mirror", a 2006 song by Ne-Yo from In My Own Words
- "Mirror", a 1996 song by X-Perience from the album Magic Fields
- "Mirror", a 2017 song by the Drums from the album Abysmal Thoughts
- "Mirror", a 2021 song by Itzy from the album Crazy in Love
- "Mirror", a 2019 song by Monsta X from the album Follow: Find You
- "Mirrors", a 2014 song from White Noise by PVRIS
- "Mirrors", a 2017 song by Niall Horan from the album Flicker
- "Mirror", a 2022 song by Kendrick Lamar from the album Mr. Morale & the Big Steppers
- "Mirror", a 2025 song by The Weather Station from the album Humanhood
- "Mirrors" an instrumental break in the 1969 song "21st Century Schizoid Man" by King Crimson

== Other ==
- Mirror (dinghy), a small boat

== See also ==
- The Mirror (disambiguation)
- Dark Mirror (disambiguation)
- Mirror Mirror (disambiguation)
- Mirror image, the reflection of an image in a mirror
- Mirroring (disambiguation)
- Spiegel (disambiguation)
- Zerkalo (disambiguation) (Russian for mirror)
