= Saeedullah Khan =

Pioneer officer of Pakistan Air Force (1926-2002)

Saeedullah Khan TQA
- سعید اللہ خان
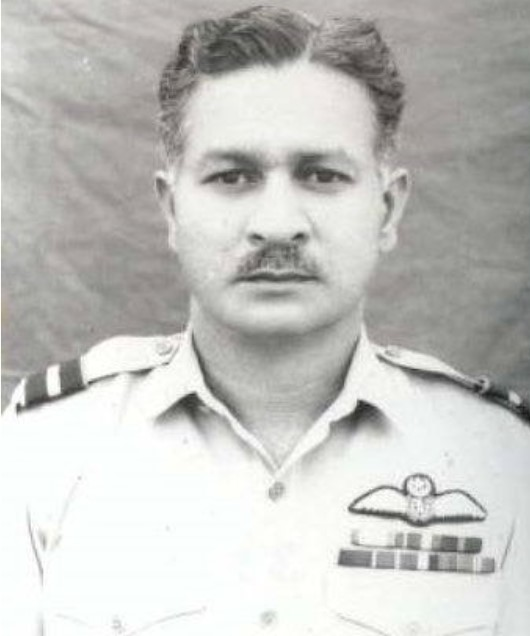
- Portrait, c. 1964

5th Deputy Chief of Air Staff Pakistan Air Force
- In office 22 June 1972 – 29 June 1973
- Chief of Air Staff: Zafar Chaudhry
- Preceded by: Khyber Khan
- Succeeded by: Chaudhary Rab Nawaz

Air Attaché to Embassy of Pakistan, Washington, D.C.
- In office January 1970 – May 1972
- Succeeded by: Eric G. Hall

Deputy Managing Director Pakistan International Airlines
- In office 29 August 1969 – January 1970
Command and staff positions
11th Commandant PAF Academy
In office February 1968 – 28 August 1969
Succeeded by	Michael John O'Brian
5th Deputy Commandant PAF Staff College
In office January 1964 – September 1964
Commander PAF Station Sargodha
In office 12 January 1962 – December 1963
Preceded by	Masroor Hosain
Succeeded by	Zafar Masud
Commander No 33 Air Supply Wing
In office May 1961 – 11 January 1962
Commander No 32 Fighter Ground Attack Wing
In office 5 May 1958 – 24 October 1958
Commander No. 2 Squadron PAF
In office 19 July 1956 – 10 April 1957
Commander No. 9 Squadron PAF
In office September 1953 – December 1955

Personal details
- Born: 23 July 1926 Bhagalpur, British India
- Died: 26 January 2002 (aged 75) Lahore, Pakistan
- Relatives: Khalifa Mohammad Asadullah (father-in-law)
- Education: Government College, Lahore; No. 1 (I) SFTS; RAF Central Flying School; RAF Staff College, Andover

Military service
- Branch/service: Royal Indian Air Force (1945-1947); Pakistan Air Force (1947-1973)
- Years of service: 1945–1973
- Rank: Air Vice Marshal
- Commands: PAF Academy; Director Operations 1965 War; PAF Station Sargodha; No. 2 Squadron PAF; No. 9 Squadron PAF
- Battles/wars: World War II; Indo-Pakistani War of 1947; Indo-Pakistani War of 1965; Air war operations
- Awards: Tamgha-e-Quaid-e-Azam (1963)

Saeedullah Khan (Note: Urdu: سعید اللہ خان) (23 July 1926 – 26 January 2002) was a Pakistani former two-star rank air officer and among the pioneer officers of the Pakistan Air Force (PAF). He served as the Deputy Chief of the Air Staff from June 1972 to June 1973. In this role, he was one of the right-hand men of Chief of Air Staff Zafar Chaudhry, alongside Assistant Chief of Air Staff (Operations) Khaqan Abbasi and Director Air Intelligence Mufti.

In the book, Flight of the Falcon, Sajad Haider wrote that Saeedullah Khan and Khaqan were involved in a witch-hunt against PAF officers, including Haider himself, attempting to implicate them in the Attock conspiracy at the behest of Zafar Chaudhry. According to Haider, he and other PAF officers discovered with "great awe and excitement" that President Zulfikar Ali Bhutto sacked Khan, Khaqan Abbasi, and Zafar Chaudhry from their duties due to allegations of intrigue and witch-hunting. Saeedullah and Khaqan were not allowed to attend their offices and were unceremoniously and prematurely retired when the PAF command changed under Bhutto. Haider further notes that Khan retired "into oblivion", playing the stock market with Hamid Qureshi, a 1965 War drop-out. Khan later worked for a rogue financial company involved in illicit financial dealings. Haider wrote that despite being financially honest, Saeedullah Khan was likely a victim of circumstances.

In July 1998, Saeedullah Khan was among 63 retired Pakistani, Indian, and Bengali armed forces personnel who signed an agreement urging Pakistan and India to refrain from developing nuclear weapons. Instead, they advocated for limiting nuclear research and development strictly to peaceful and beneficial purposes. They also called for Pakistan and India to resolve their disputes through peaceful means and address their real problems of poverty and backwardness, rather than wasting their scarce resources on acquiring means of destruction.

Air Chief Marshal Anwar Shamim recalled serving under Khan and said, "I learnt a lot especially from Group Captain Saeedullah Khan. He was well read, knowledgeable, and had excellent grasp of what the PAF needed for the future. He was firm and demanded hard work from his subordinates. He was a thorough gentleman and dedicated family man. He was a well-dressed officer and also appreciated those who dressed up well. In fact, he was what one would truly call an officer and gentleman."

== Early life and education ==
Saeedullah Khan was born on 23 July 1926 in Bhagalpur to S.A. Khan, an officer of the Indian Civil Service. Saeedullah graduated from the Government College, Lahore.

== Personal life ==
Saeedullah Khan married Qudsia, a daughter of Khalifa Mohammad Asadullah.

== Service years ==
=== Royal Indian Air Force ===
Saeedullah Khan was commissioned into the Royal Indian Air Force on 17 September 1945, after graduating from the 38th course of the No. 1 (I) SFTS.

=== Pakistan Air Force ===
After the Partition of British India on 14 August 1947, Khan opted for the Royal Pakistan Air Force. He attended the No. 102 Flying Instructors Course of the RAF Central Flying School from 28 August 1947 to 14 January 1948.

In 1948, Flight Lieutenant Saeedullah Khan was instructing Flying Officer Saleem-el-Edroos, the son of Syed Ahmed El Edroos, in dogfight maneuvers when Saleem crashed, resulting in a fatal accident.

In 1951, No. 9 Sqn formed the first aerobatics team on their Hawker Furys, known as The Red Dragons, which was the first aerobatic team in the Indian subcontinent. They performed at the farewell ceremony for the outgoing Commander-in-Chief Richard Atcherley. The team members were Sqn. Ldr. Zafar Chaudhry, Flt. Lt. Saeedullah Khan, Flying Officers T. H. Gotting and M. Hayat Khan.

Squadron Leader Saeedullah Khan commanded No. 9 Sqn from September 1953 to December 1955 and No. 2 Sqn, from July 1956 to March 1957. He later served as Wing Commander, commanding No. 32 Fighter Ground Attack Wing from May to September 1958 and No. 33 Wing from May to December 1961. Subsequently, as a Group Captain, he commanded PAF Station Sargodha from January 1962 to November 1963.

From January to September 1964, Air Commodore Saeedullah Khan was the Deputy Commandant of PAF Staff College.

Saeedullah Khan was deputed to Pakistan International Airlines (PIA) as the Deputy Managing Director on 29 August 1969 by Air Marshal Abdur Rahim Khan. During his tenure, Saeedullah Khan inaugurated a two-week course on aviation accident prevention and investigation. The course, was held for the first time in Pakistan and was co-sponsored by the PIA, Civil Aviation Authority of Pakistan, and the Swedish Institute of Aviation Safety.

On the visit of the Chinese basketball team to Pakistan in 1973, the Chinese embassy gave a reception which was attended by AVM Saeedullah Khan, other senior officials and Pakistani basketball players.

== Death ==
Saeedullah Khan died on 26 January 2002 at the age of 75 in Lahore, Pakistan.

== Effective dates of promotion ==
Insignia	Rank	Date
	Air Vice Marshal	June 1972
	Air Commodore	January 1964
	Group Captain	13 January 1962
	Wing Commander	5 May 1958
	Squadron Leader	September 1953
	Flight Lieutenant	1948
	Flying Officer	17 September 1946
	Pilot Officer	17 September 1945

== Awards and decorations ==
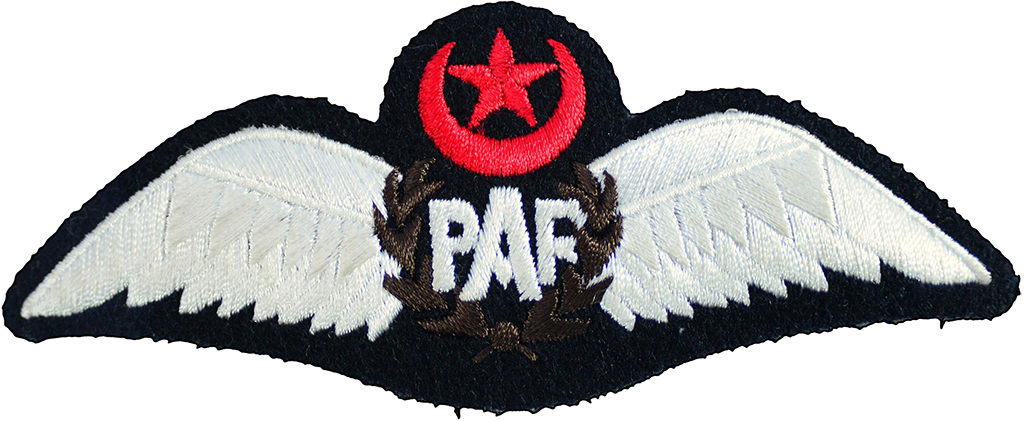

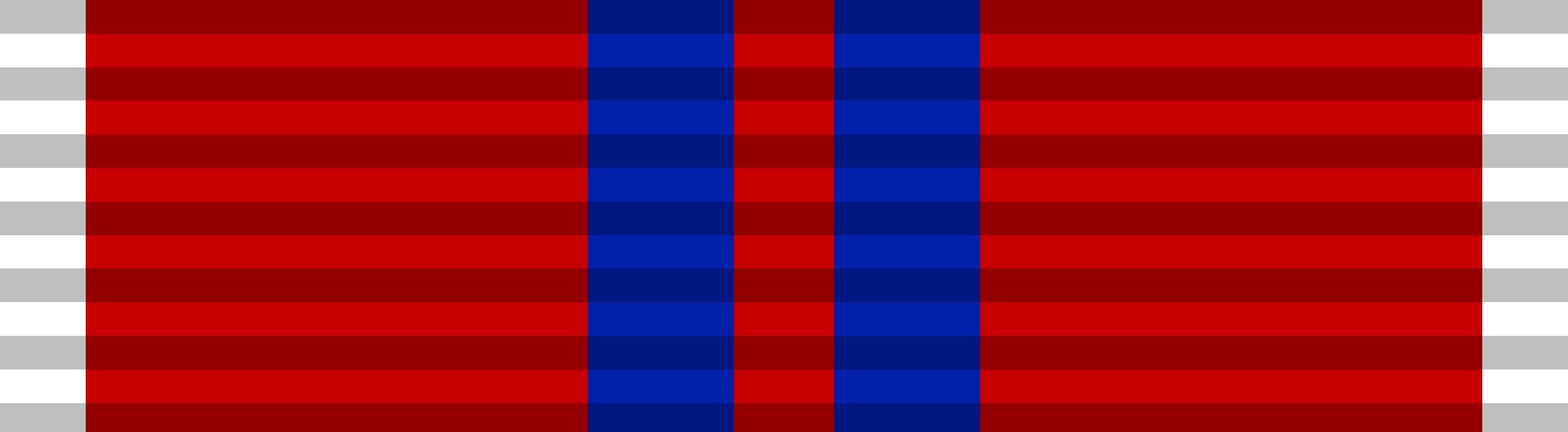

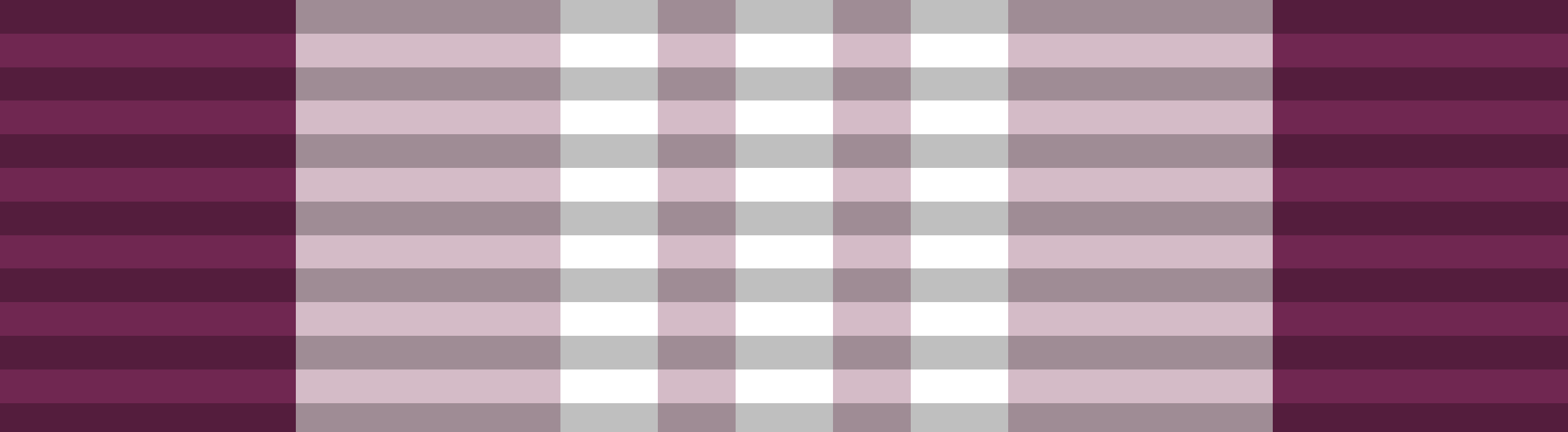

PAF GD(P) Badge RED (More than 3000 Flying Hours)
Pakistan Medal (Pakistan Tamgha) 1947		Tamgha-e-Qayam-e-Jamhuria (Republic Commemoration Medal) 1956	Tamgha-e-Diffa (Defence Medal); 1947 war Clasp
War Medal 1939–1945	Queen Elizabeth II Coronation Medal 1953	Tamgha-e-Quaid-e-Azam Medal of the Quaid-e-Azam; 1963	Sitara-e-Harb 1965 War (War Star 1965)
