= The Mirror =

The Mirror may refer to:

== Books and stories ==
- The Mirror, a book by T. B. Joshua
- The Mirror, a novelette by Nancy Farmer
- "The Mirror", a short story by Eiko Kadono
- "The Mirror", a short story by Raphael Soyer
- The Mirror (novel), a 1978 horror novel by Marlys Millhiser

== Newspapers ==
- Daily Mirror, a UK tabloid newspaper
- Montreal Mirror, a Quebec alternative weekly, 1985–2012
- The Mirror, a media and political gossip blog written by Betsy Rothstein on The Daily Caller
- The Fairfield Mirror or The Mirror, the student newspaper for Fairfield University
- The Mirror (UNC newspaper), the student newspaper for the University of Northern Colorado
- The Mirror (Pakistani magazine)
- The Mirror (Western Australia), a weekly newspaper published in Western Australia between 1920 & 1956
- The Mirror of Australia, a newspaper published in Sydney, New South Wales from 1917 to 1919
- The Mirror, the campus newspaper of Lakeland University
- The Mirror, the newspaper of William Penn Charter School
- Kyemon, a Burmese language newspaper
- The Mirror (1779–1780), a short lived literary magazine by Henry Mackenzie
- The Mirror of Literature, Amusement and Instruction (1822-1847), a cheap periodical
- Reedy's Mirror, a literary journal published in St. Louis, Missouri, from 1891 to 1944; title changed to The Mirror in 1895
- The Daily Mirror (Sydney) (1941–1990), tabloid afternoon newspaper

== Film and television ==
- The Mirror (1913 film), a film by Anthony O'Sullivan
- The Mirror (1914 film), a film starring Charlotte Burton
- The Mirror (1915 film), a short dramatic film directed by Joseph Kaufman
- The Mirror (1917 film), a film starring Marjorie Rambeau
- The Mirror (1943 film) (Spanish:El Espejo), an Argentine drama directed by Francisco Múgica
- The Mirror (1967 film), a film by Qin Tao
- The Mirror (1975 film), a film by Andrei Tarkovsky
- The Mirror, also known as Aina, a 1977 film by Nazrul Islam
- The Mirror, also known as Aaina, a 1993 film by Deepak Sareen
- The Mirror, also known as Oglinda, a 1993 film by Sergiu Nicolaescu
- The Mirror (1997 film), a film by Jafar Panahi
- The Mirror (1999 film), a film by Siu Wing
- The Mirror (2005 film), a film starring Robert Sedgwick
- The Mirror (2014 film), a British film
- The Mirror (2015 film), a Chinese-South Korean film
- "The Mirror" (The Amazing World of Gumball), a 2014 episode of The Amazing World of Gumball
- "The Mirror", an episode of Strange Experiences
- "The Mirror" (The Twilight Zone), a 1961 episode of The Twilight Zone

== Music ==
- The Mirror (Spooky Tooth album), a 1974 rock album
- The Mirror (Ja Rule album)
- The Mirror (Trisha Yearwood album)
- The Mirror, an album by Raul Midón
- "The Mirror", a song by Dream Theater from Awake

== See also ==
- Der Spiegel, a German newspaper
- Mirror (disambiguation)
