= Mountstuart Elphinstone =

Scottish statesman and historian

The Honourable Mountstuart Elphinstone FRSE
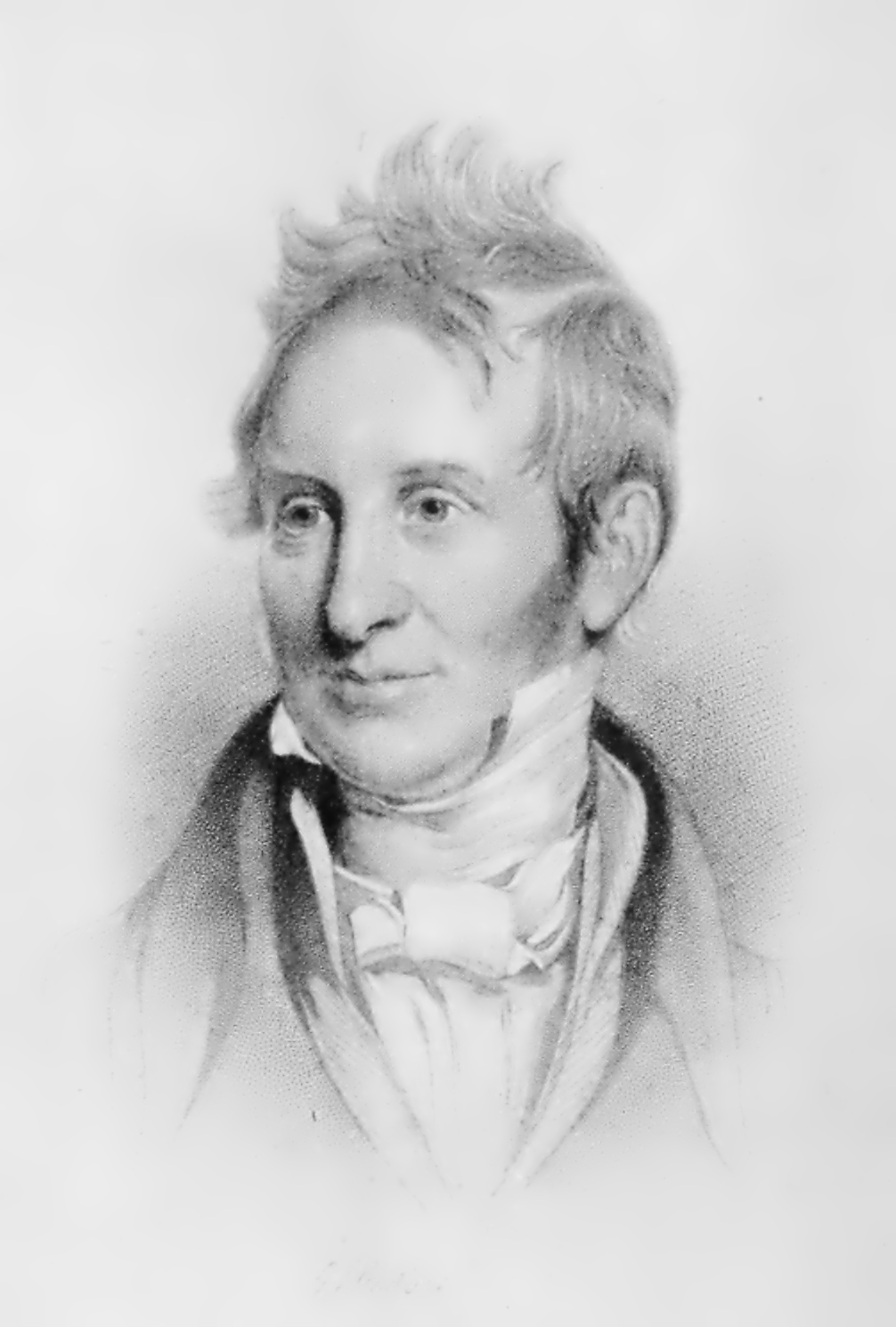

Governor of Bombay
- In office 1 November 1819 – 1 November 1827
- Governors-General: The Marquess of Hastings; The Earl Amhurst
- Preceded by: Sir Evan Nepean
- Succeeded by: Sir John Malcolm

Personal details
- Born: 6 October 1779 Dumbarton, Dumbartonshire, Scotland
- Died: 20 November 1859 (aged 80) Hookwood, Surrey, England
- Education: Royal High School
- Occupation: Statesman, historian
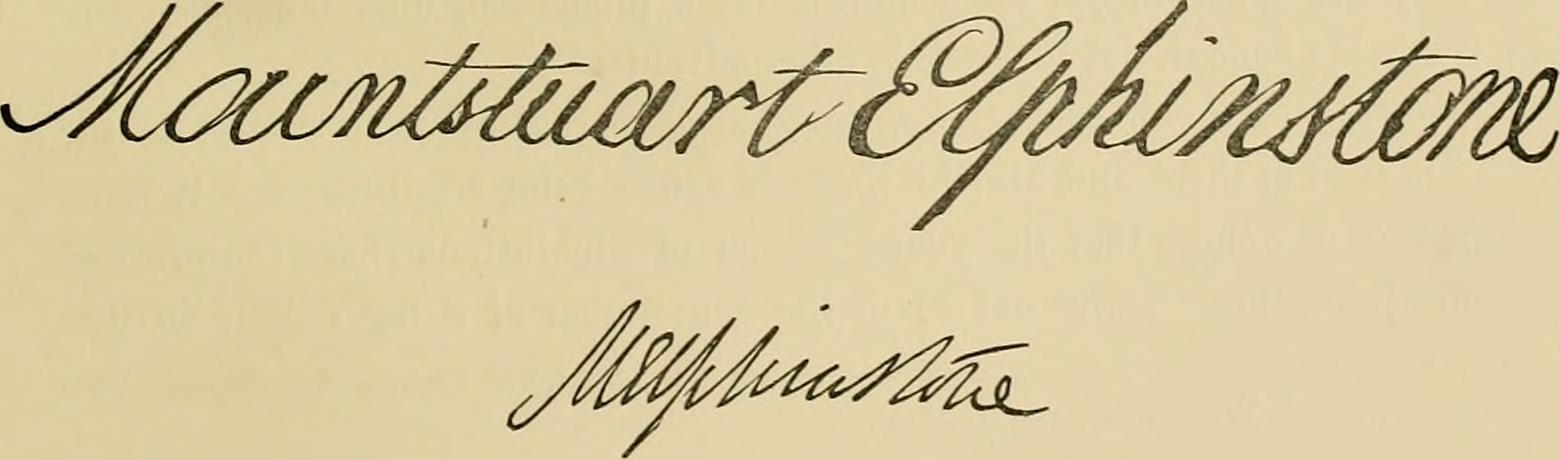
- Signature

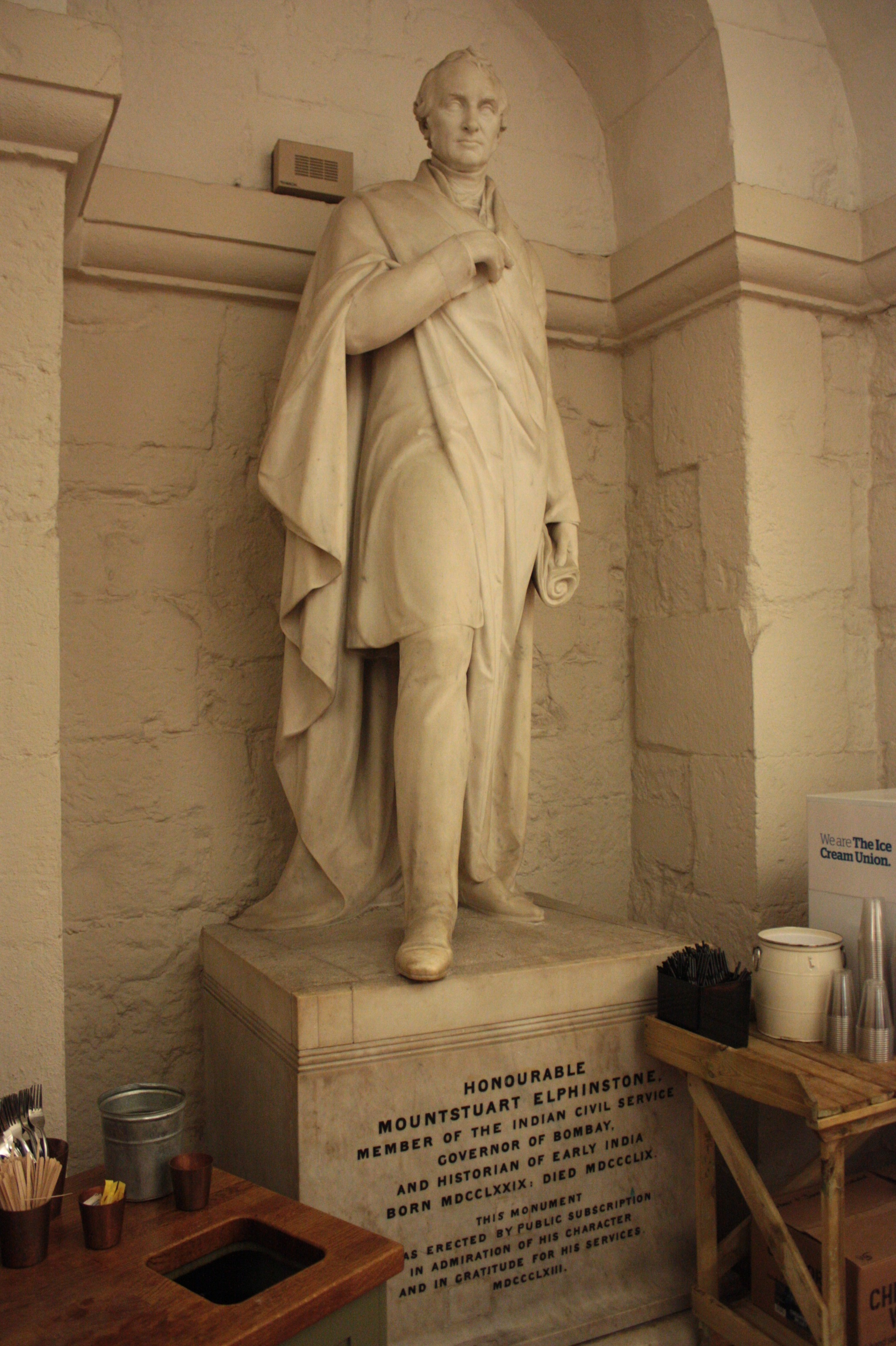
Mountstuart Elphinstone's memorial in St Paul's Cathedral

Mountstuart Elphinstone FRSE (6 October 1779 – 20 November 1859) was a Scottish statesman and historian, associated with the government of British India. He later became the Governor of Bombay (now Mumbai) where he is credited with the opening of several educational institutions accessible to the Indian population. Besides being a noted administrator, he wrote books on India and Afghanistan. His works are pertinent examples of the colonial historiographical trend.

== Early life ==
Born in Dumbarton, Dumbartonshire (now Dunbartonshire) on 6 October 1779, educated at the Royal High School. He was the fourth son of the 11th Baron Elphinstone, by Anna, daughter of Lord Ruthven, in the peerage of Scotland. Having been appointed to the civil service of the British East India Company, of which one of his uncles was a director, he arrived at Calcutta (now Kolkata) early in 1796 where he filled several subordinate posts. In 1799, he escaped massacre in Benares (now Varanasi) by the followers of the deposed Nawab of Awadh Wazir Ali Khan. In 1801 he was transferred to the Diplomatic Service where he was posted as the assistant to the British resident Josiah Webbe at the court of the Peshwa ruler Baji Rao II.

== Envoy ==
In the Peshwa court he obtained his first opportunity of distinction, being attached in the capacity of diplomatist to the mission of Sir Arthur Wellesley to the Marathas. When, on the failure of negotiations, war broke out, Elphinstone, though a civilian, acted as virtual aide-de-camp to Wellesley. At the Battle of Assaye, and throughout the campaign, he displayed rare courage and knowledge of tactics such that Wellesley told him he ought to have been a soldier. In 1804, when the war ended, Elphinstone was appointed British resident at Nagpur. This gave him plenty of leisure time, which he spent in reading and study. Later, in 1807, he completed a short stint at Gwalior.

In 1808 he was appointed the first British envoy to the court of Kabul, Afghanistan, with the object of securing a friendly alliance with the Afghans against Napoleon's planned advance on India. However this proved of little value, because Shah Shuja was driven from the throne by his brother before it could be ratified. The most valuable permanent result of the embassy was in Elphinstone's work titled Account of the Kingdom of Cabul and its Dependencies in Persia and India (1815).

After spending about a year in Calcutta arranging the report of his mission, Elphinstone was appointed in 1811 to the important and difficult post of resident at Pune. The difficulty arose from the general complication of Maratha politics, and especially from the weakness of the Peshwas, which Elphinstone rightly read from the first. The tenuous peace between the Peshwas was broken in 1817 with the Marathas declaring war on the British. Elphinstone assumed command of the military during an important crisis during the Battle of Khadki also called Third Anglo-Maratha War and managed to secure a victory despite his non-military background. As reparations, Peshwa territories were annexed by the British. Elphinstone became the Commissioner of the Deccan in 1818.

== Governor ==
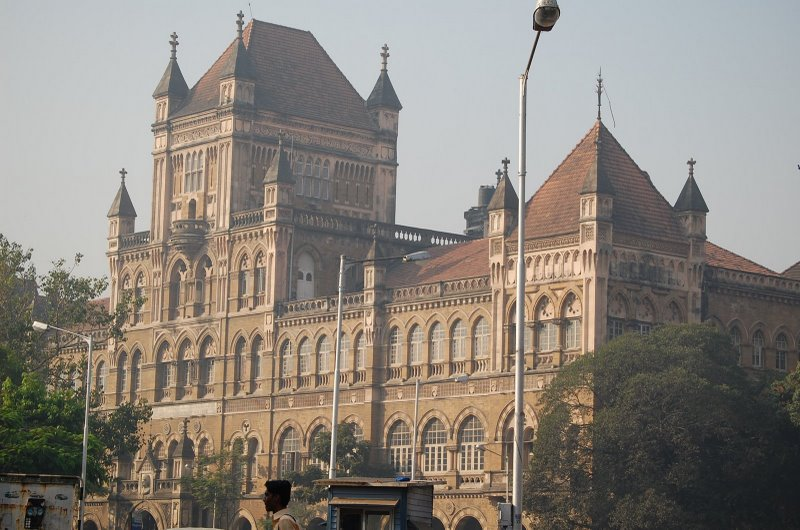
Elphinstone College, Mumbai, established in 1856

In 1819, Elphinstone was appointed Lieutenant-Governor of Bombay, a post he held until 1827. During his tenure, he greatly promoted education in India, at a time when opinion in Britain was against educating the "natives". He may fairly be regarded as the founder of the system of state education in India. One of his principal achievements was the compilation of the "Elphinstone code", a system of criminal law. He also returned many lands that had been appropriated by the British to the Raja of Satara.

He built the first bungalow in Malabar Hill during this time, and following his example, many prominent people took up residence here. It soon became a fashionable locality, and remains so to the present.

His connection with the Bombay Presidency is commemorated in the endowment of Elphinstone College by local communities, and in the erection of a marble statue by the European inhabitants. However, the Elphinstone Road railway station (renamed in 2018 to Prabhadevi Railway Station), and the Elphinstone Circle (renamed in 1947 to Horniman Circle, both in Mumbai city, were not named after him but in honour of his nephew, John, 13th Lord Elphinstone, who later also became Governor of Bombay in the 1850s. One of Karachi's main commercial streets was previously named Elphinstone Street but has been renamed Zaibunnisa Street.

The township of Elphinstone, Victoria, Australia, was named after him. The suburb of Mount Stuart, Tasmania, Australia, and its main road, Elphinstone Road, were also named after him.

There is a statue of him in the crypt of St Paul's Cathedral in London.

== Return to Great Britain ==
Returning to Britain in 1829, after an interval of two years' travel, Elphinstone continued to influence public affairs, but based in England rather than Scotland. Nevertheless, he was elected a Fellow of the Royal Society of Edinburgh in 1830 with his proposer being Sir John Robison.

He was one of the seven founders of the Royal Geographical Society which formed on 16 July 1830.

He twice refused appointment as Governor-General of India, preferring to finish his two-volume work, History of India (1841). He died in Hookwood, Surrey, England, on 20 November 1859. He is buried in Limpsfield churchyard. There is also a memorial to him in St Paul's Cathedral.

James Sutherland Cotton later wrote his biography as part of the Rulers of India series in 1892.

The historian James Grant Duff named his son after Elphinstone.

== Published works ==
- Elphinstone, Mountstuart (1815). An Account of the Kingdom of Cabul, and its Dependencies in Persia, Tartary, and India. London: Longman, Hurst, Rees, Orme, and Brown.
- Elphinstone, Mountstuart (1841). The History of India. Vol. I (1 ed.). London: John Murray.
- Elphinstone, Mountstuart (1841). The History of India. Vol. II (1 ed.). London: John Murray.
  - Elphinstone, Mountstuart (1905). History of India (9 ed.). London: John Murray. OL 14012858M.
- Elphinstone, Mountstuart (1887). Colebrooke, Edward (ed.). The Rise of the British Power in the East. London: John Murray.

== See also ==
- Asiatic Society of Bombay
- Horniman Circle Gardens

== Bibliography ==
- Cotton, James Sutherland (1892). Mountstuart Elphinstone. Rulers of India XII. Oxford: Clarendon Press. ISBN 9788130700281.

Political offices
Preceded by Sir Evan Nepean	Governor of Bombay; 1819–1827	Succeeded by Maj Gen Sir John Malcolm
