= Star of India =

The Star of India may refer to:

- Star of India (gem), one of the largest star sapphires in the world
- The Star of India emblem, emblem of the British Raj, or Indian Empire
  - Most Exalted Order of the Star of India (1861–1947), an order of chivalry associated with the Indian Empire
- Star of India (ship), a museum ship in San Diego, California, US
- Star of India (film), a 1954 British film starring Cornel Wilde
- Star of India (car), Rolls-Royce Phantom II of Maharajah of Rajkot
- The Star (Pakistan), a defunct Karachi newspaper previously published as The Star of India in Calcutta
- Star of India, a fictional spaceship in the 1967 novel Lord of Light by Roger Zelazny
