= No. 2 Squadron PAF =

No. 2 Squadron Minhasians
- Active: Since 15 April 1956; 69 years ago
- Country: Pakistan
- Allegiance: Pakistan Armed Forces
- Branch: Pakistan Air Force
- Type: Fighter squadron
- Role: Multi-role
- Part of: Southern Air Command
- Airbase: PAF Base Masroor
- Nickname: Minhasians
- Mascot: Rashid Minhas

Commanders
- Notable commanders: Saeedullah Khan

Insignia
- Patch

- Paris Air Show Patch

Aircraft flown
- Attack: JF-17

No. 2 Squadron, nicknamed the Minhasians, is a Multi-role, fighter squadron of the Pakistan Air Force (PAF). It is named after Pilot Officer Rashid Minhas, the youngest & PAF's sole recipient of the Nishan-e-Haider Gallantry medal.

== History ==
No 2 Squadron was established on 15 April 1956 at PAF Station Mauripur as No 2 Fighter Conversion Unit, initially equipped with T-33 aircraft. In December 1979, it was designated as No 2 Composite Squadron and later, in September 1990, renamed No 2 Air Superiority Squadron.

The squadron's original mission was to provide jet conversion training for new graduates from the PAF Academy and conduct check rides and instrument ratings for all jet pilots of the Pakistan Air Force. In May 1972, following the disbandment of No 20 Photo Reconnaissance Squadron, No 2 Squadron acquired its RT-33 aircraft and photographic equipment, thus expanding its responsibilities.

With its new designation as a composite squadron in December 1979, No 2 Squadron took on additional tasks such as ground-controlled interceptions for training Air Defence Controllers and aerial target towing for all three services. In August 1982, after No 7 Squadron was temporarily disbanded, No 2 Squadron inherited its B-57 aircraft, adding night interdiction and special missions to its role.

In September 1990, the squadron was equipped with F-7P aircraft, and for two years it uniquely operated both vintage bombers and Mach 2 fighter jets. By 1992, the T-33 and B-57 aircraft were retired, and No 2 Squadron focused exclusively on its role as an Air Superiority Squadron with F-7P aircraft.

No 2 Squadron holds the unique honor of being associated with the only Nishan-e-Haider awarded to the PAF. On 20 August 1971, Pilot Officer Rashid Minhas died in an attempt by his instructor to hijack their aircraft to India during the 1971 War.

The squadron distinguished itself in both the 1965 and 1971 Wars, conducting day and night harassment attacks on Indian convoys and providing close air support missions.

== Aircraft flown ==
No. 2 Squadron Minhasians
Role	Operational	Aircraft	Notes
Jet trainer/Reconnaissance	1954–1981	T-33 Shooting Star	
Bomber Aircraft	1956–1990	B-57 Canberra	
Multi-role	2015—Present	JF-17 Thunder	

== Gallery ==
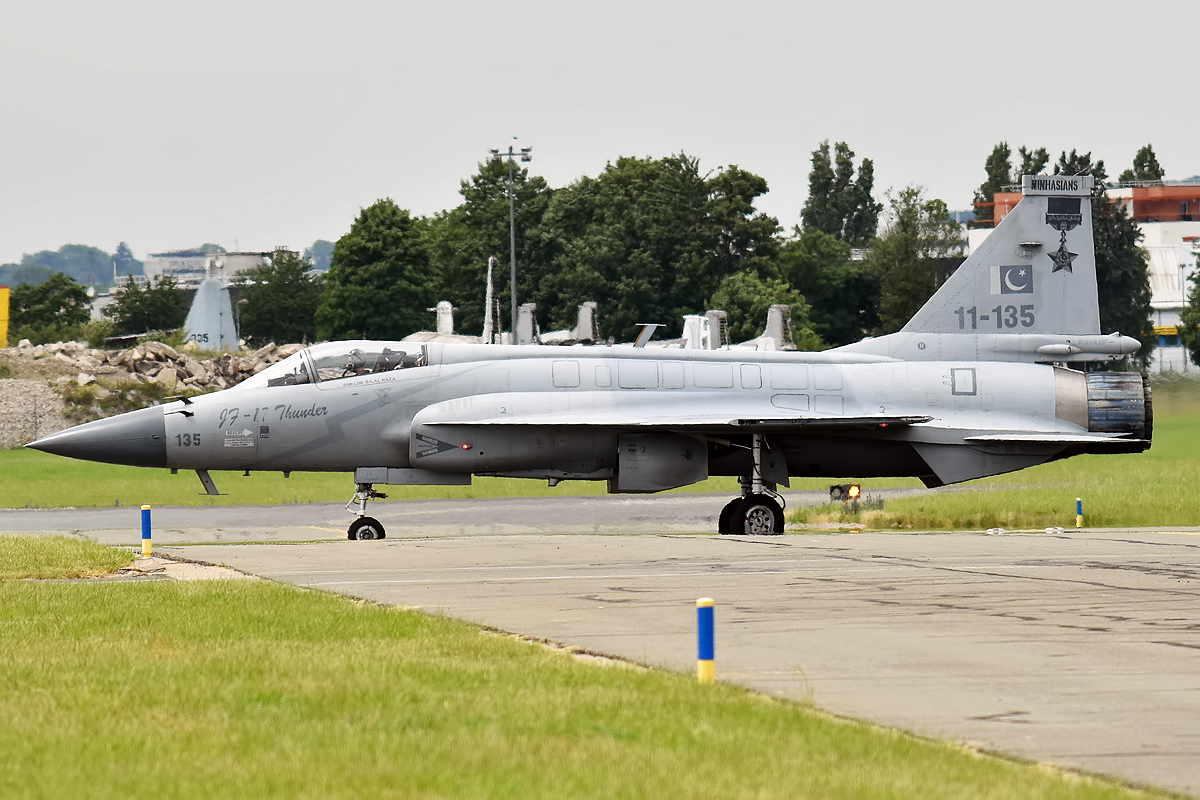
PAC JF-17 Thunder from the No. 2 Squadron with markings of the Squadron on its tail

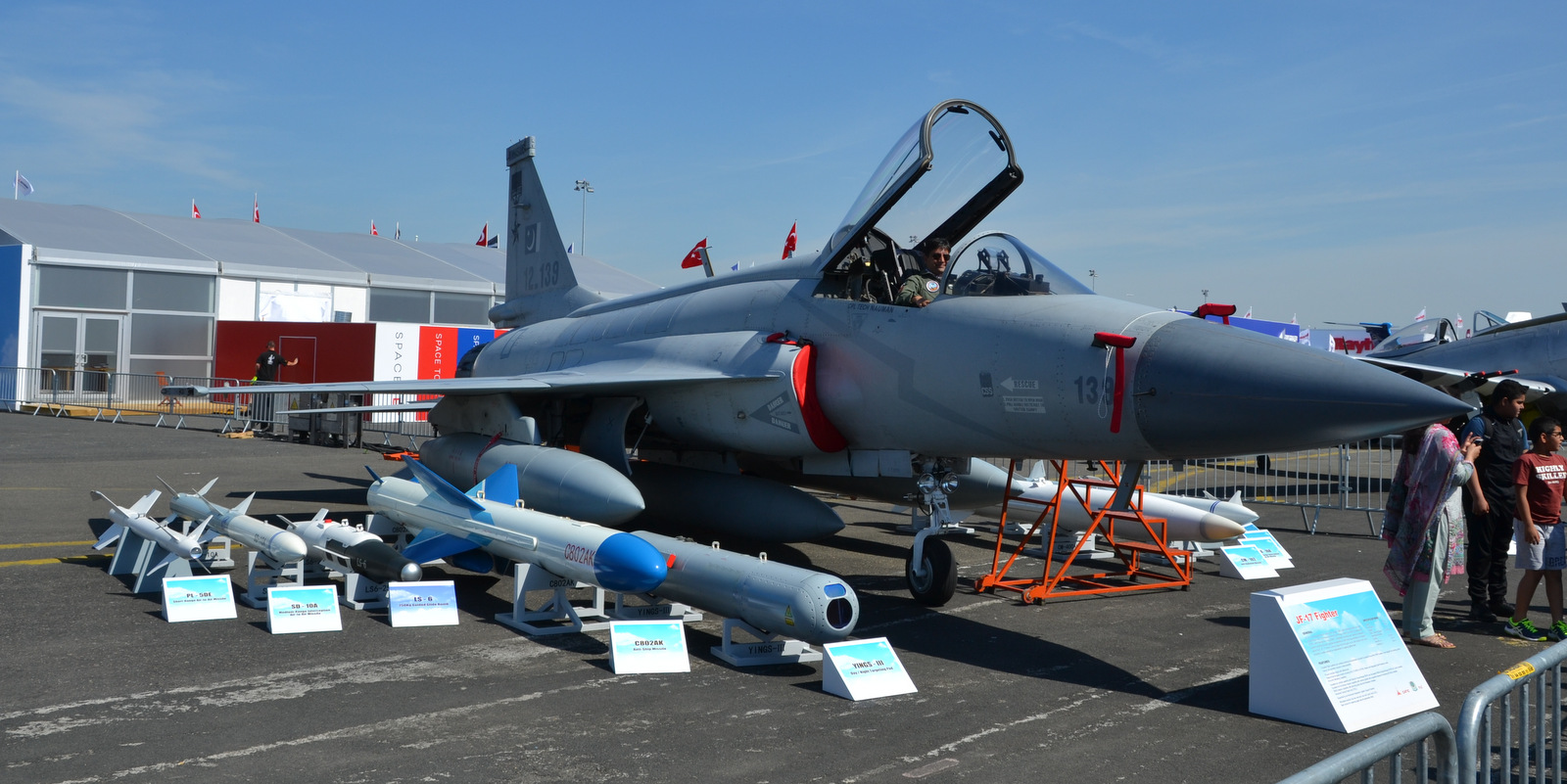
A JF-17 Thunder from the No. 2 Squadron on display at the Paris Airshow with its armament

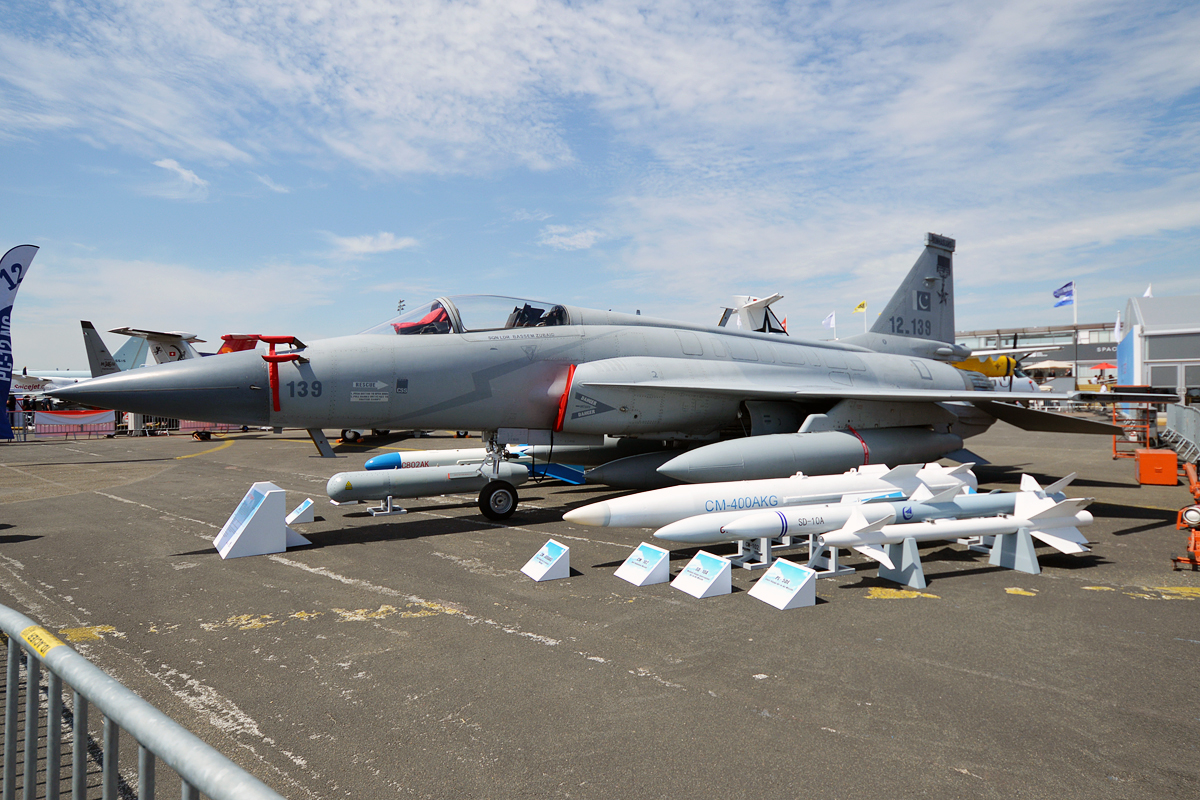
JF-17 from No. 2 Squadron at the Paris Airshow

== See also ==
- List of Pakistan Air Force squadrons
