= Black Mirror (disambiguation) =

Black Mirror (2011–present) is a British science fiction television anthology series.

Black Mirror, Black Mirrors or Black mirror may also refer to:

== Arts and entertainment ==
- Black Mirror (novel), a 2002 novel by Gail Jones
- "Black Mirror" (song), a 2007 song by Arcade Fire
- "Black Mirror", a 2021 song by Oneus
- Batman: The Black Mirror (2011), a 10-issue comic book series by Scott Snyder
- The Black Mirror (video game), a 2003 video game
  - Black Mirror (2017 video game), a 2017 reboot
- Black Mirrors, a Belgian rock band

== Other uses ==
- Black mirror (glass) or Claude glass, an 18th-century artist's tool

== See also ==
- Dark Mirror (disambiguation)
