= Zaibunnisa Street =

Shopping area and street in Karachi, Pakistan

Zaibunnisa Street زیب النساء اسٹریٹ
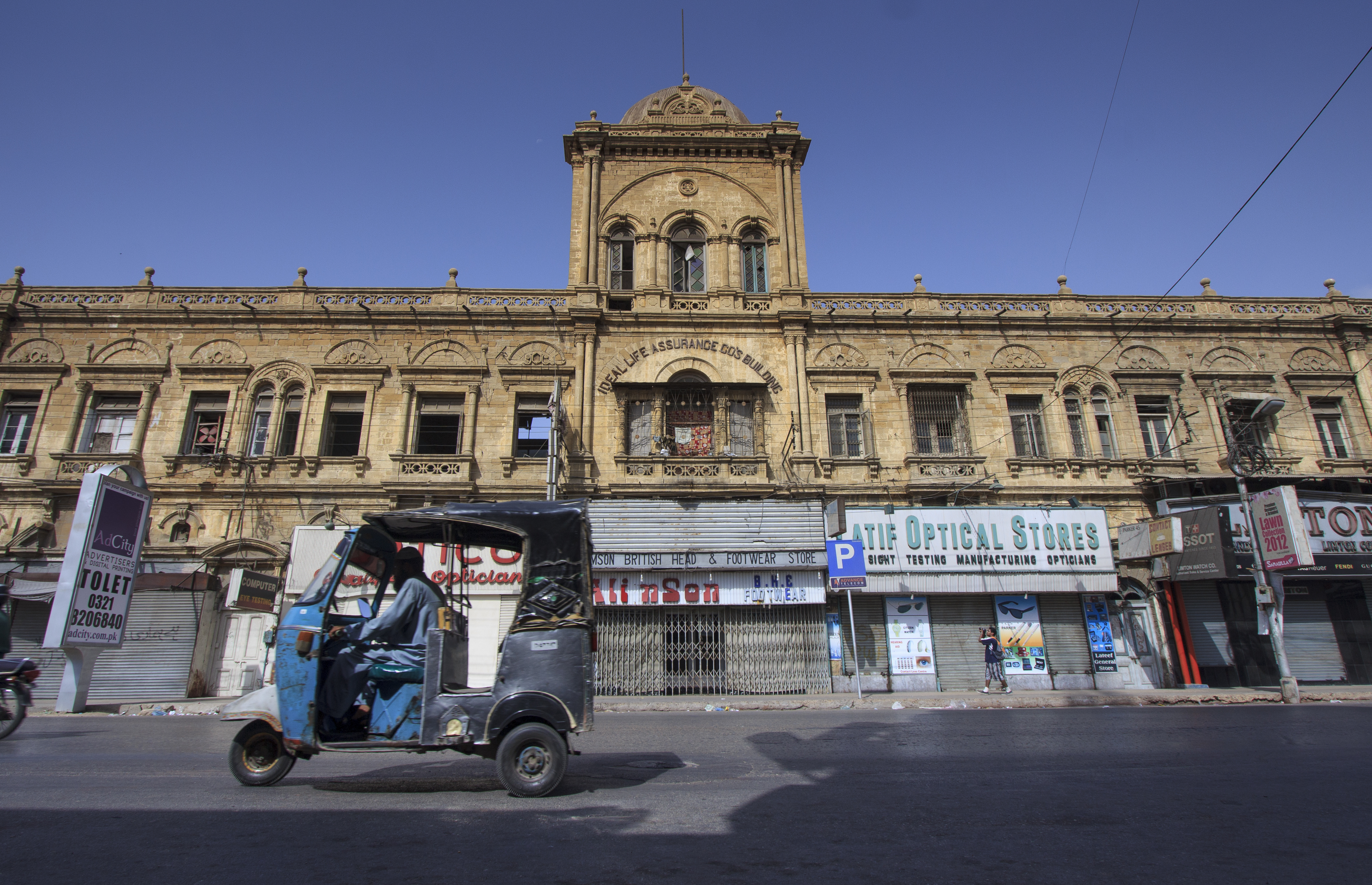
- The street is lined by several heritage buildings
- Former name: Elphinstone Street
- Namesake: Zaib-un-Nissa Hamidullah
- Length: 1.1 km (0.68 mi)
- Location: Saddar in central Karachi, Pakistan
- North end: Garden Square (intersection with MA Jinnah Road
- South end: Inverarity Road

Zaibunnisa Street or Elphinstone Street (former name) (Urdu: زیب النساء اسٹریٹ), is a thoroughfare and a shopping center in central Karachi, Pakistan that courses through Saddar, the city's colonial-era commercial centre.

It is widely understood to have been renamed after Zaib-un-Nissa Hamidullah, Pakistan's first woman editor and publisher, in 1970. However, some historians argue it was renamed after the Mughal princess Zeb-un-Nissa.

== History ==
The road was founded as Elphinstone Street and was named after Mountstuart Elphinstone, the first British ambassador to Afghanistan who also played a vital role in defeating the Maratha Empire. It used to be one of the most prestigious shopping areas in Karachi before the newly built shopping malls in the suburban areas of Karachi were built from the 1980s onwards. Zaibunnisa Street now is known for having a huge number of watch, clock and jewelry shops, large clothing stores for women and men, as well as shoe stores.

== Route ==
Zaibunnisa Street begins at Garden Square - the point at which it intersects with Muhammad Ali Jinnah Road (former name is Bunder Road). From there, it courses south, first intersecting with Castle Street near the Brooks Memorial Church. From there, it passes Price Street near Jahangir Park and intersects with Preedy Street. It then enters the central part of Saddar, where it is lined with several heritage buildings. Going south, it intersects with Hale Street in Bohri Bazaar, Albert Street, Woodburn Street, Parr Street, Shahrah-e-Iraq, Dundass Street, Blenken Street, before ending at Sarwar Shaheed Street. From there, it continues south as Fatima Jinnah Street towards Civil Lines.

== Gallery ==
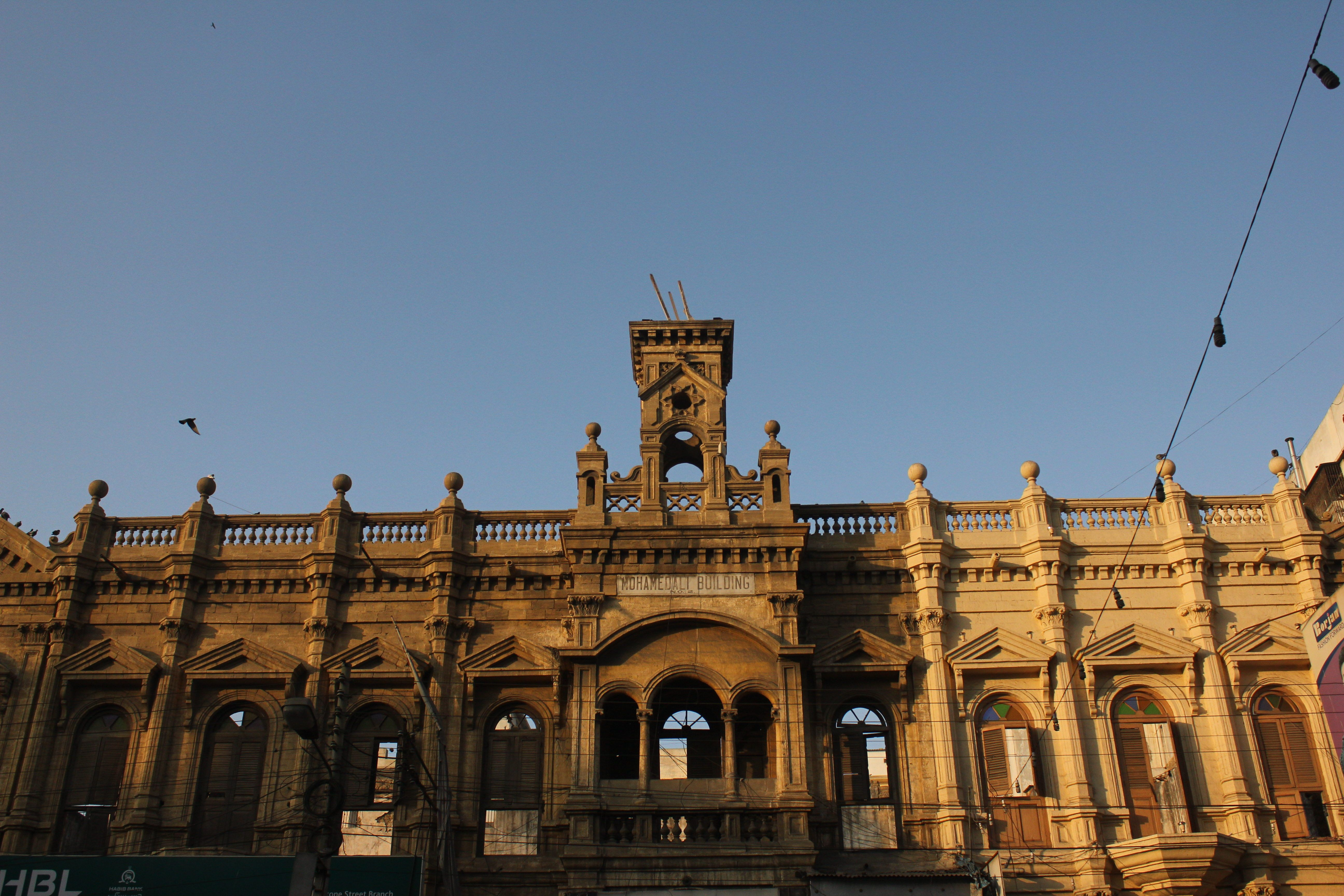
The historic Mohammad Ali Building

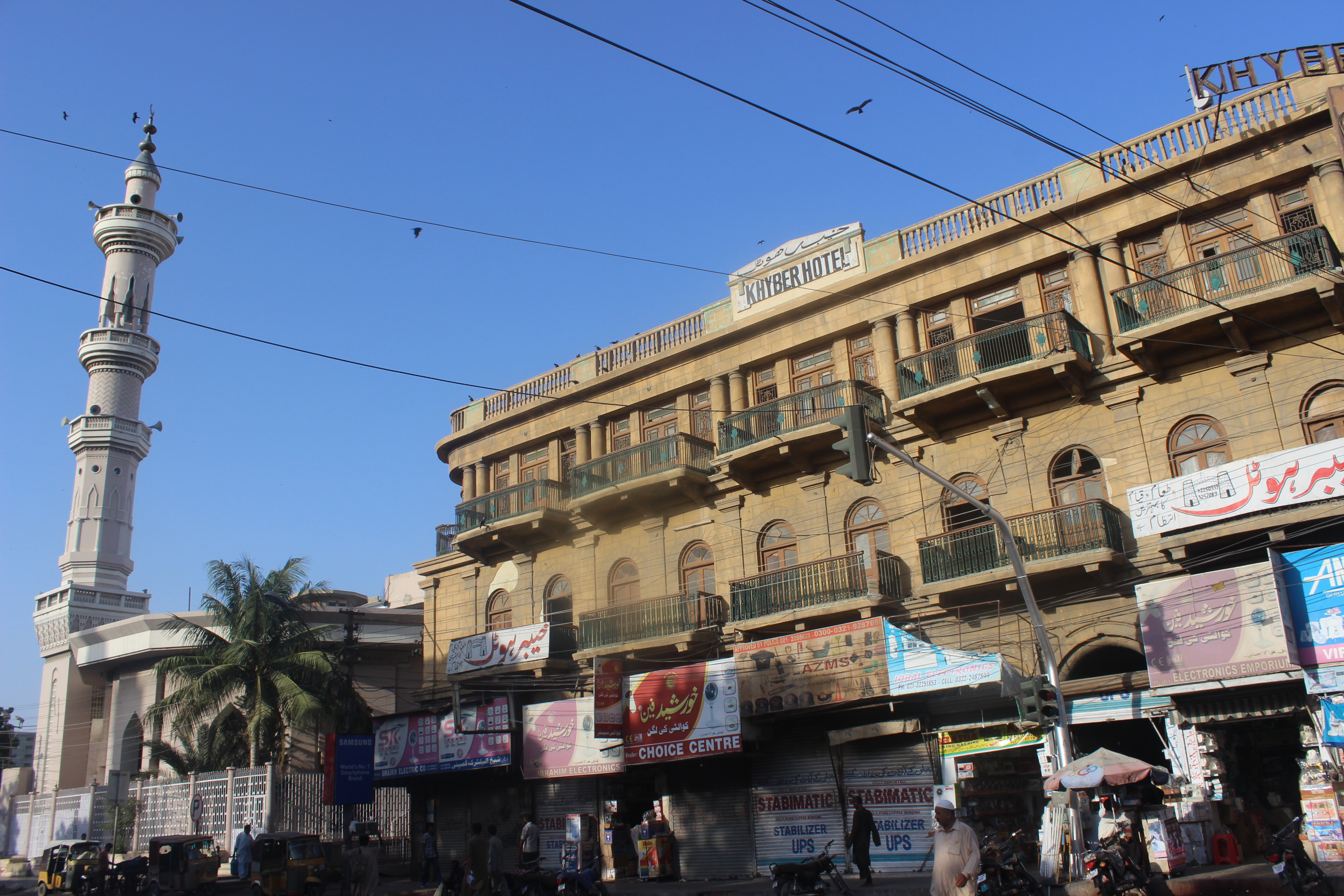
The historic Khyber Hotel, at the intersection of Zaibunnisa Street and Preedy Street

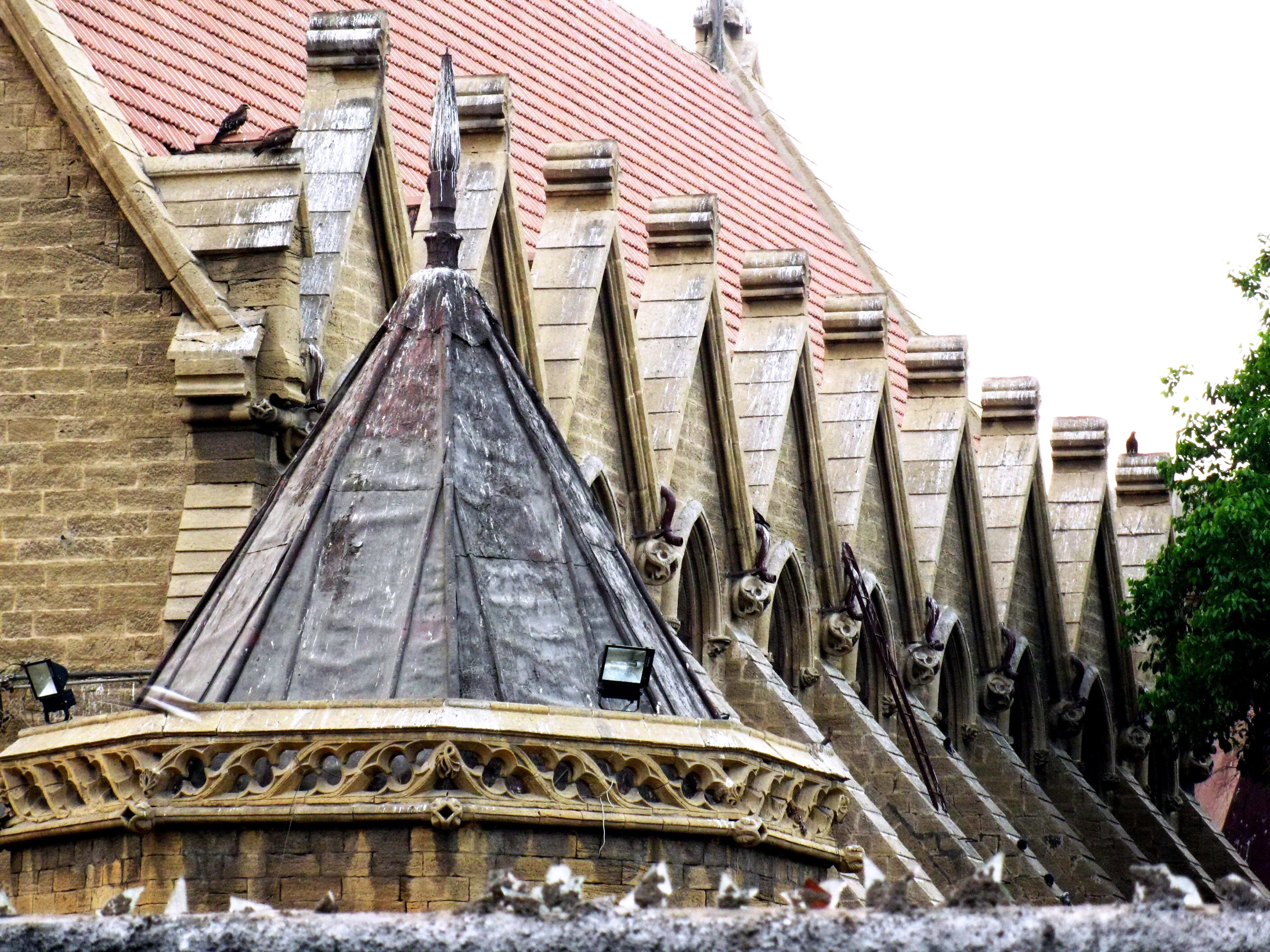
St. Andrews Church, at the intersection with Preedy Street

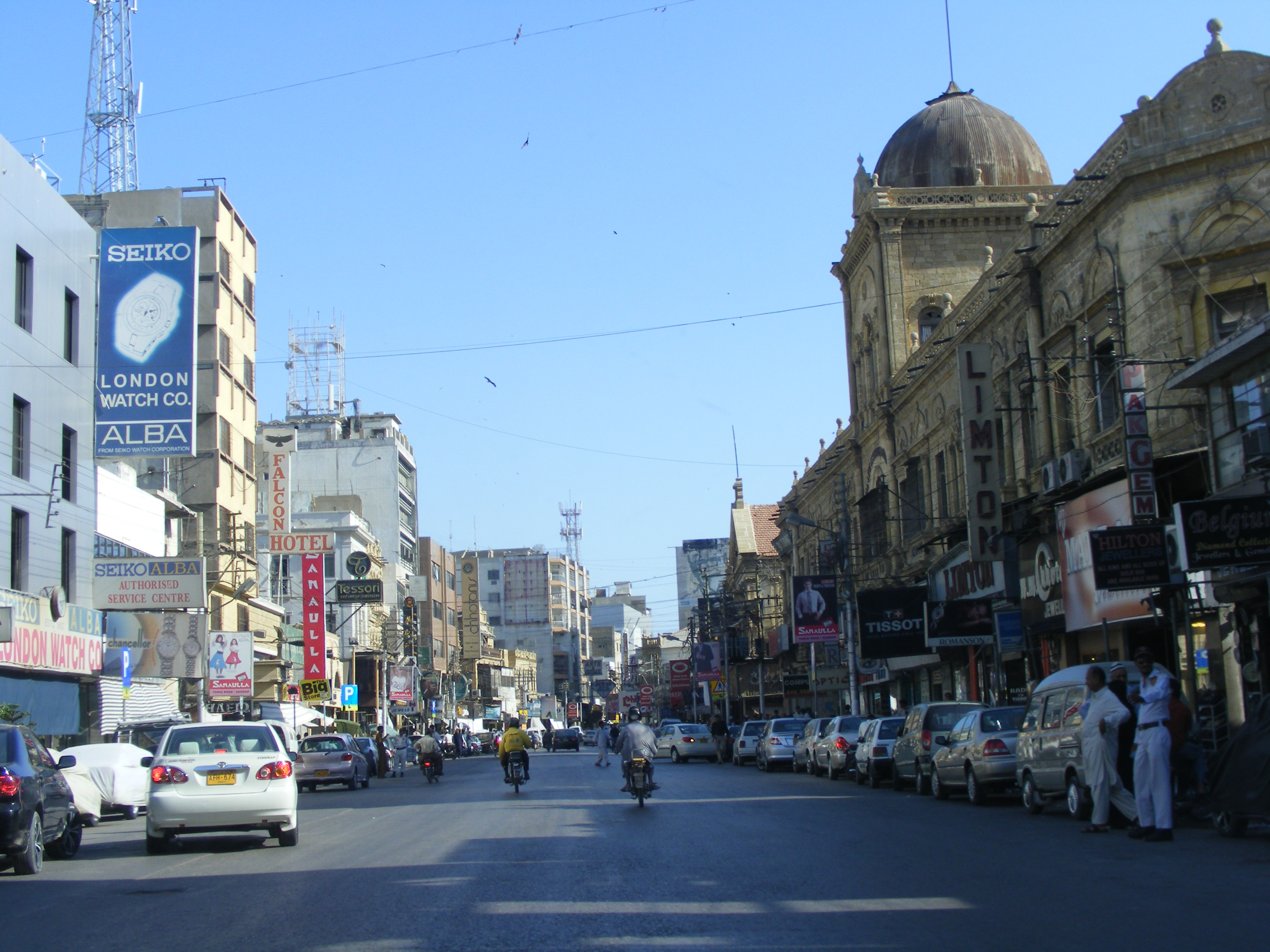
The street in 2009

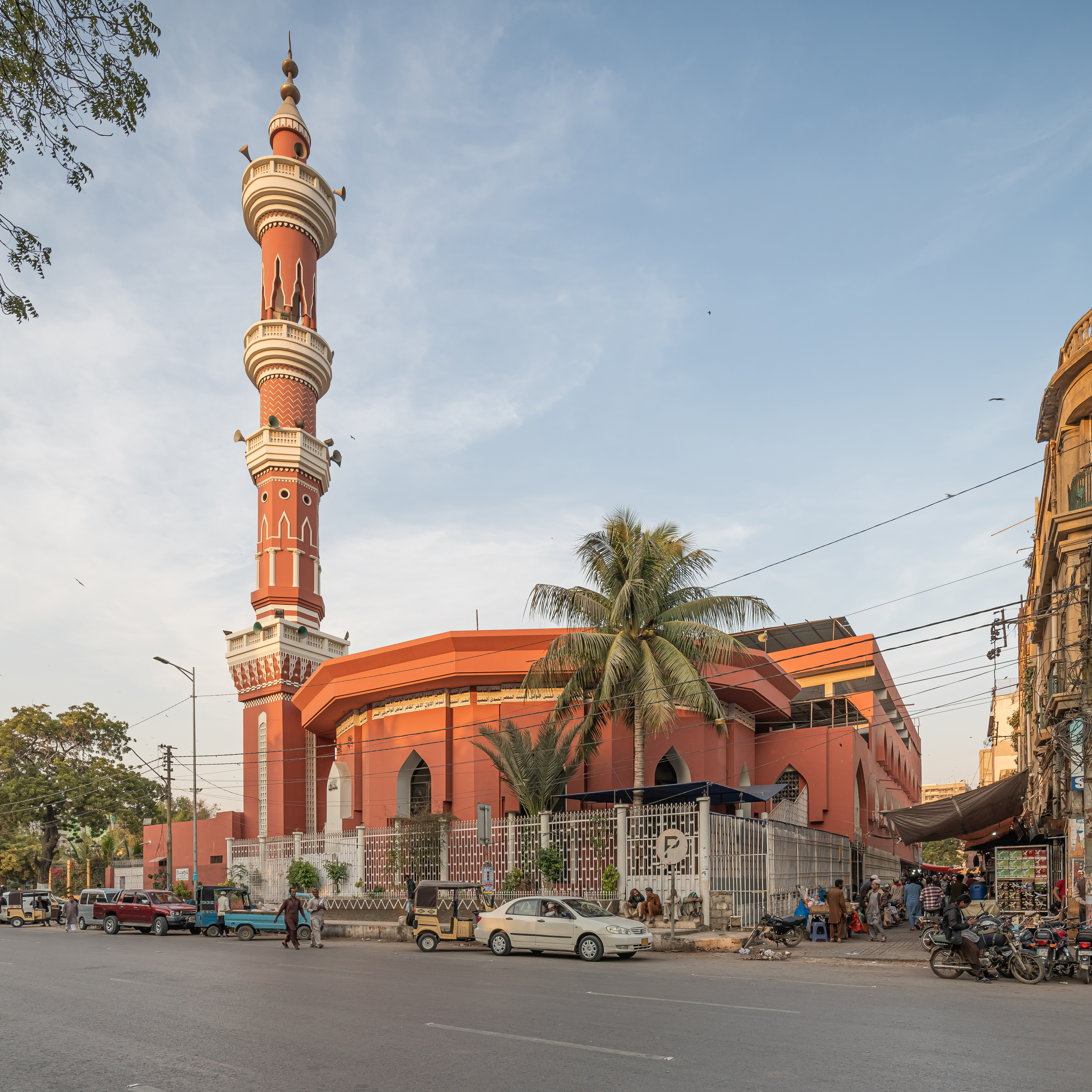
Salih Mosque, near Khyber Hotel

== See also ==
- Zaib-un-Nissa Hamidullah
- List of streets in Karachi
