= Khalifa Mohammad Asadullah =

Director of the Imperial Library of India during the British Raj

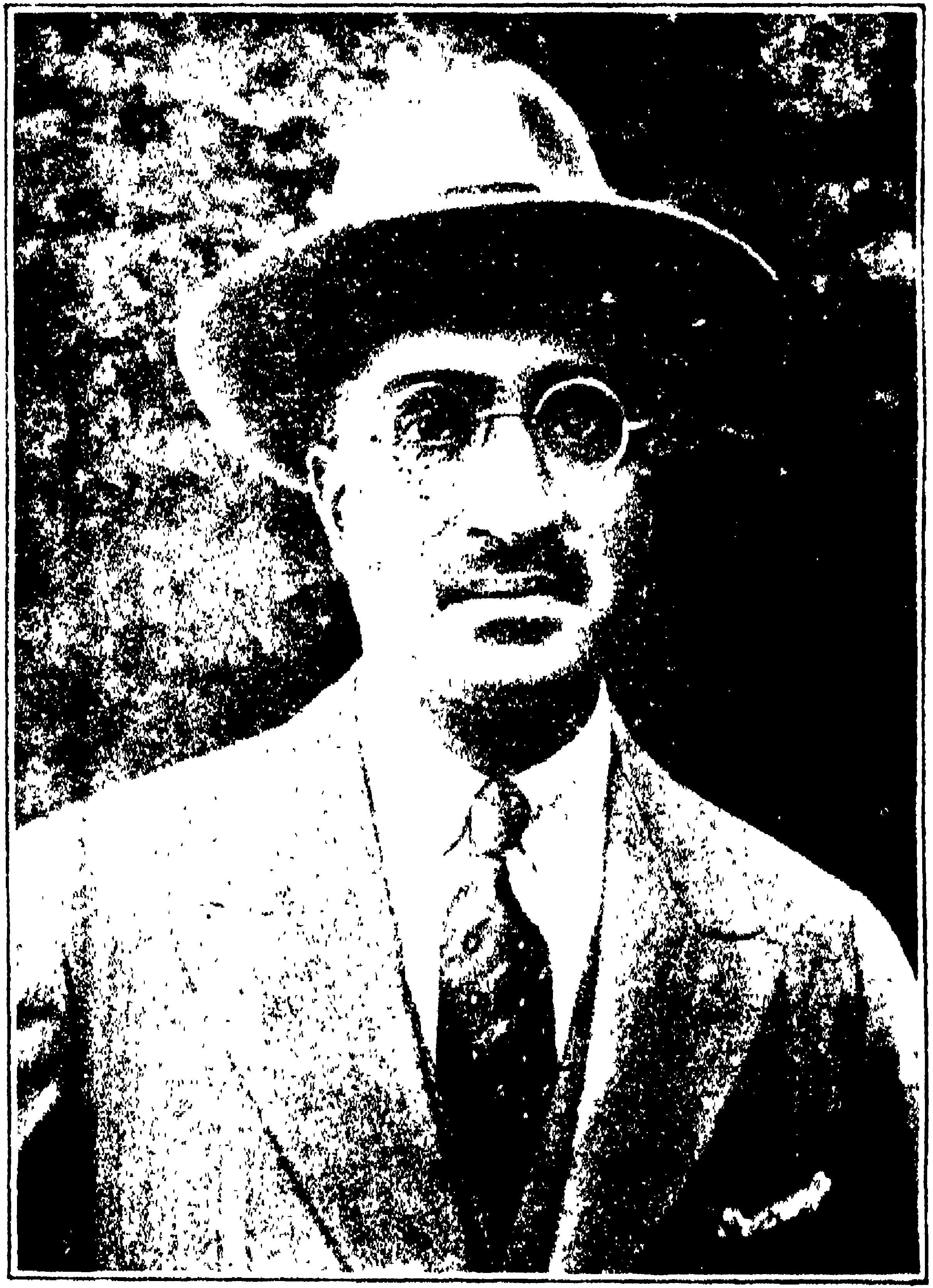
K. M. Asadullah in Grandhaalayasarvasvamu, 4 january 1935

Khalifa Mohammad Asadullah (6 August 1890 – 23 November 1949) was a pioneer of the library movement in the Indian subcontinent before 1947. He was also the first prominent librarian to opt for Pakistan at the time of independence in 1947.

== Early life ==
He was born on 6 August 1890 in Lahore, British India (now Pakistan) to Maulvi Mohammd Ziaullah and Alam Jan of Simla. He received his basic education in Lahore and graduated from Forman Christian College, Lahore in 1913.

== Marriage and family ==
In 1908, he married Hameeda Begum in Lahore and fathered 14 children. His sons included Khalifa Mohd Iftikharullah TQA, Khalifa Mohd Naseemullah, Khalifa Mohd Hamidullah, Khalifa Mohd Ihsanullah, Khalifa Mohd Zafarullah (Commander Pak Navy), Khalifa Mohd Aminullah. His sons-in-law included AVM Saeedullah Khan and Pakistani diplomat, Enver Murad; his daughters-in-law included pioneering journalist Zaib-un-Nissa Hamidullah; and his great granddaughters include the Pakistani novelist, Uzma Aslam Khan.

== Training ==
He studied under the American librarian Asa Don Dickinson in 1915 at the University of the Punjab.

== Career ==
In 1916, he became the first qualified librarian of the Government College in Lahore. He then became the librarian of MAO College (now Aligarh Muslim University) in 1919. In 1921, he joined the Imperial Secretariat Library in New Delhi and Simla, a post he held for 8 years.

In 1930, he was appointed the librarian of the Imperial Library (now National Library of India) in Calcutta, a post which he held for about 17 years from 1930 – 1947. While there, he started the library training programme.

== Pakistan ==
In 1947, after the independence of Pakistan, he was made officer on special duty in the Ministry of Education.

== Indian Library Association ==
In 1933, he was one of the founding members of Indian Library Association and was its first secretary from 1933 to 1947. He had served as the librarian and a director from 1930 – 1947 of the Imperial Library of India in British India.

== Honours ==
He was honoured with the title of Khan Bahadur in 1935.

== Death ==
He died on 23 November 1949 due to a stroke at Lahore, Pakistan. He was buried in his family section of the Ferozpur Road graveyard, Lahore.
