= Mirror Mirror =

Mirror Mirror may refer to:

== Film ==
- Mirror, Mirror (1979 film), an American made-for-television drama film
- Mirror, Mirror (1990 film), a 1990 horror film
- Mirror Mirror (film), a 2012 live-action adaptation of Snow White

== Literature ==
- "Mirror, mirror on the wall...", a variation of a famous phrase uttered by the wicked queen in certain adaptations of the 1812 fairy tale Snow White.
- Mirror, Mirror, a 1967 science-fiction short story by Alan E. Nourse.
- Mirror, Mirror (Bell novel), a 1996 novel by Hillary Bell based on the 1995 TV show of the same name
- Mirror, Mirror (novel), a 2003 novel by Gregory Maguire based on Snow White and the Seven Dwarfs
- Mirror Mirror: A History of the Human Love Affair With Reflection, a 2003 nonfiction book
- Mirror Mirror, the planned upcoming 19th novel in The Dresden Files.

== Music ==
=== Albums ===
- Mirror Mirror (10cc album) (1995), the 11th and last album by British pop band 10cc
- Mirror Mirror (Dardanelles album) (2007), their debut album
- Mirror Mirror (EP), by Twiztid
- Mirror Mirror (Ghinzu album), the third album by the Belgian rock band
- Mirror Mirror (Kelly Price album), the second album by the R&B singer-songwriter
- Mirror Mirror (Joe Henderson album), 1980
- Mirror, Mirror (Soundtrack) (1990), soundtrack for the film Mirror, Mirror
- Mirror Mirror (soundtrack) (2012), soundtrack by Alan Menken for the film Mirror Mirror
- Mirror, Mirror (EP), a 2013 EP by Farewell, My Love
- Mirror Mirror (Eliane Elias album) (2021)
- Mirror Mirror (The Irrepressibles album) (2010)
- Mirror Mirror (Hakos Baelz album) (2026)

=== Songs ===
- "Mirror Mirror" (4minute song), 2011
- "Mirror Mirror" (Blind Guardian song), 1998
- "Mirror, Mirror" (Diamond Rio song), 1991
- "Mirror Mirror" (Diana Ross song), 1981
- "Mirror Mirror" (Dollar song), also known as "Mirror Mirror (Mon Amour)"
- "Mirror Mirror" (Helloween song), 2000
- "Mirror Mirror" (M2M song), 2000
- "Mirror Mirror" (Solid Base song), 1995
- "Mirror, Mirror (Look into My Eyes)", by Def Leppard from High 'n' Dry
- "Mirror Mirror", by Bury Your Dead from Beauty and the Breakdown
- "Mirror Mirror", by Candlemass from Ancient Dreams
- "Mirror, Mirror", by David Gates from The David Gates Songbook
- "Mirror Mirror", by Don Dokken from Up from the Ashes
- "Mirror Mirror", by Kamelot from Karma
- "Mirror Mirror", by King Diamond from Give Me Your Soul...Please
- "Mirror Mirror", by LL Cool J from 10
- "Mirror Mirror", by Pinkerton's Assorted Colours
- "Mirror Mirror", by Sylosis from The New Flesh
- "Mirror Mirror (I See a Damsel)", a song by Violent Femmes from New Times
- "Mirror, Mirror", by Warkings from Revenge

== Television ==
=== TV episodes ===
- "Mirror, Mirror" (Star Trek: The Original Series), 1967
- "Mirror, Mirror", an episode the 1983 television animated series Dragon's Lair
- "Mirror, Mirror" (Amazing Stories), 1986
- "Mirror Mirror" (Desperate Housewives), 2008
- "Mirror Mirror" (House), 2007
- "Mirror, Mirror on the Wall: Part 1", a Murder, She Wrote episode, followed by "Mirror, Mirror on the Wall: Part 2" (1989)
- "Mirror, Mirror", an unproduced episode of the American superhero animated television series Transformers: Animated
- "Mirror Mirror", an episode of the TV series Pocoyo.

=== TV series ===
- Mirror, Mirror (TV series), a 1995 Australia/New Zealand co-produced television series
  - Mirror, Mirror II, a co-production between Australia and New Zealand that was released in 1997
- Mirror, Mirror (TV series), a 2021 Australian factual television series hosted by Todd Sampson
- Mirror Mirror, a Greek television comedy starring Thanasis Veggos

== See also ==
- Mirror (disambiguation)
