= Mirroring (disambiguation) =

In psychology, mirroring is a behaviour in which one person copies another person

Mirroring may also refer to:

- AirPlay Mirroring, an iOS 5 feature for wireless video streaming
- Disk mirroring, replicating the entire content of a storage disk
- Port mirroring, replicating network packets for diagnostic purposes

== See also ==
- Mirror (disambiguation)
