= S. Wajid Ali =

Bengali writer (1890–1951)

Sheikh Wajid Ali
- Born: 4 September 1890; Baratajpur, Bengal Presidency, British India
- Died: 10 June 1951 (aged 60); Calcutta, West Bengal, India
- Occupation: Writer
- Children: Zaib-un-Nissa Hamidullah, among others

Sheikh Wajid Ali (Bengali: এস ওয়াজেদ আলী; 4 September 1890 – 10 June 1951) was a Bengali writer, nationalist and barrister-at-law. He was the father of the prominent Pakistani journalist Zaib-un-Nissa Hamidullah and grand-father of Indian actress Nafisa Ali.

== Early life ==
Wajid Ali was born on 4 September 1890 to the Bengali Muslim family in the village of Baratajpur, a village near Janai and Begampur, of Hooghly district. S. Wajed Ali's maternal grandmother hailed from the Nawabpur village in Janai of Hooghly district.

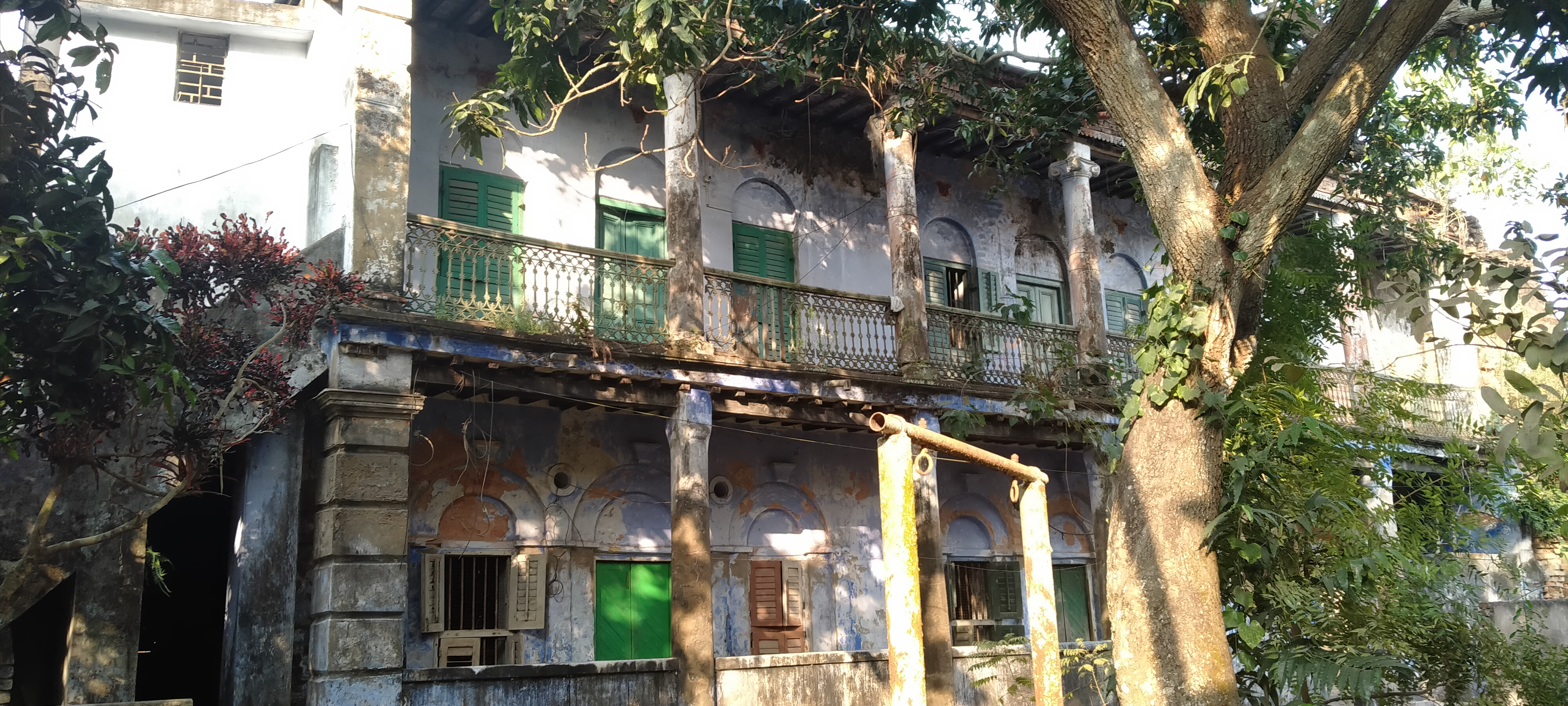
House of S. Wajid Ali in Baratajpur

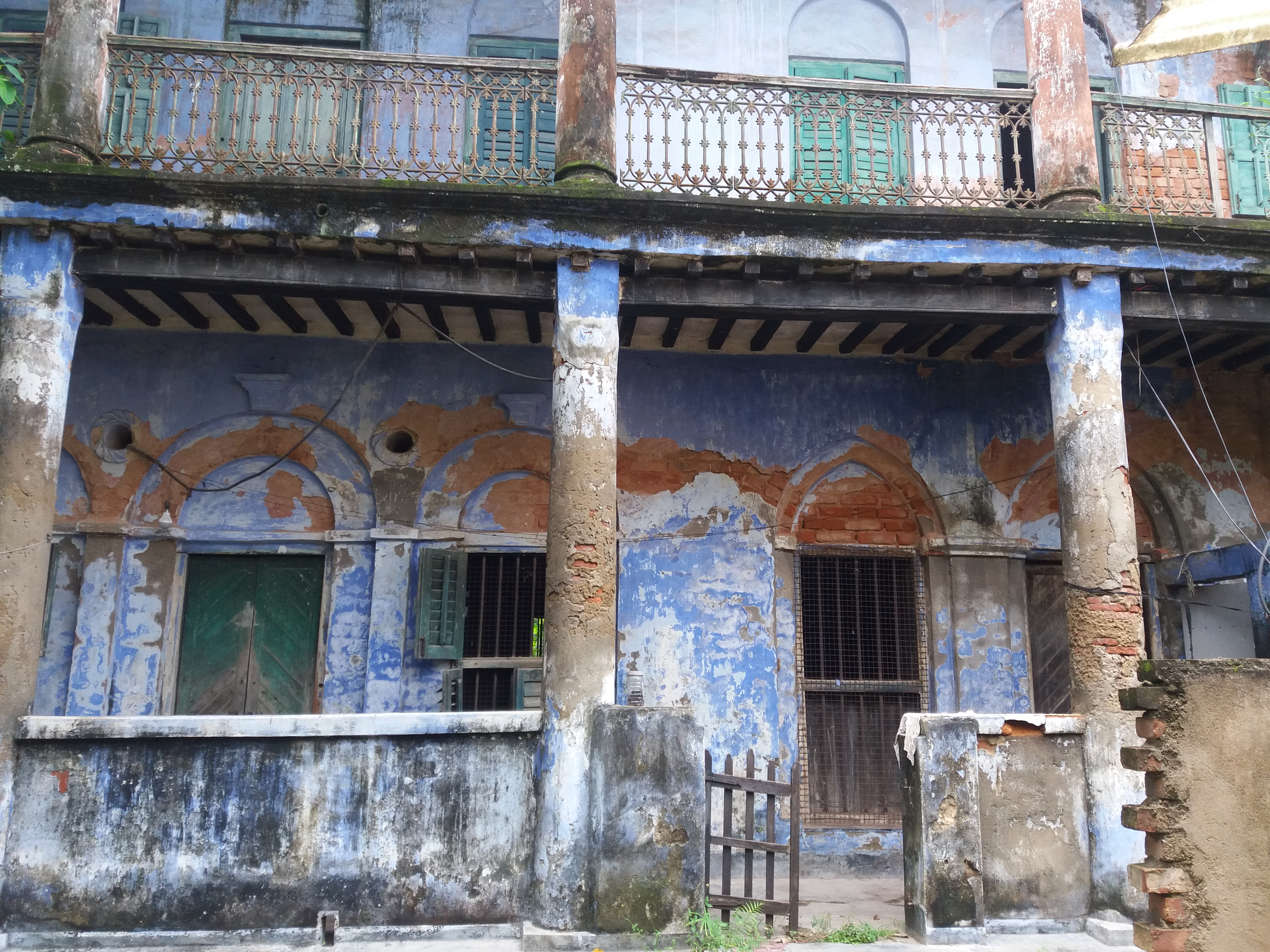
House of S. Wajid Ali

Her father, who came from Mungaer, had settled in Nawabpur with a 'Jaigir' and married into the local Bengali community. Wajed Ali's three maternal uncles were 'Hafiz' in Koran and his grandfather's home atmosphere was one of religious conservatism. However, the natural beauty of Nawabpur touched him deeply as expressed in his memoirs. Wajed Ali's education began in the village 'Madrasa' or school. At this stage, in 1897 he had his first marriage, at the early age of seven, with his six-month-old cousin Ayesha (the daughter of his paternal uncle Sheikh Golam Rahman). In 1898, at the age of eight, Wajed Ali came to Shillong and started education under the tutelage of his father, Sheikh Belayet Ali. Later, he was admitted to the English medium Mokhar School in Shillong, from where he graduated in his 'Entrance Exams' with a gold medal. This phase of his life in Shillong, Meghalaya had a lasting impression upon him.

He went to Aligarh MAYO college, where he was recognised as a meritorious student. He subsequently passed his I.A. and B.A. exams from Allahabad University in 1908 and 1910 respectively. After his graduation from Allahabad, he returned to his village of Baratajpur and spent a happy family life amidst the rural idyllic surroundings. His first child, Lutfunnissa, was born at this time. He was trying hard to convince his family to allow him to go to England for further education. Finally, with the enthusiasm and recommendations of his second uncle, he succeeded in getting their permission and left for London just a couple of years before the start of World War I. In 1911 Wajed Ali matriculated at Christ's College, Cambridge, University of Cambridge, where he read law, obtaining his BA in 1914. He was then called to the Bar at the Middle Temple in London in 1915.

== Career ==
=== The beginnings ===
While in Cambridge, he had fallen seriously ill and Miss Eleanor Saxby of Bristol had come forward to take care of him, and enable his subsequent recovery. From this episode started a relationship between them which culminated in his second marriage and divorce from Ayesha Begum, at the obvious displeasure of his family members back home. The year was 1915 – World War I was raging in Europe. It was at this time that S. Wajed Ali started the practice of Law in Calcutta High Court and continued till 1922. All this while, he lived with Eleanor in Mott Lane, Ripon Lane, Ripon Street etc. in Calcutta. Ill fortune struck when various factors of the failure of the family business, failing health, extravagant lifestyle – all combined to drive him to bankruptcy. He immersed himself in deep studies about the contemporary society and involved himself in the elite literary world of the time. At the advice of his friend, Pramatha Chowdhury (editor of weekly Shobuj Potro), he started writing in Bengali and began an extraordinary literary career.

=== 1923 – 1928 ===
In 1923, he was appointed the third presidency magistrate of Calcutta and a few days later he started living with his family in No. 1 Canal Road in Calcutta. At this period he devoted himself to his literary pursuits. He expressed himself with supreme creative excellence in the fields of prose, symbolism, story-writing, translation, travelogues, etc. His troubled marriage with Mrs. Eleanor Saxby (Nellie) came to an end in 1928, when the mother of his two sons, Ahmed and Abdullah and daughter Zeb-un-Nissa separated from him and married his younger brother S. Shamsher Ali. This turn of events drove him into a family crisis and utter loneliness. The dramatic family complications made him hurt susceptible and psychologically isolated. In the face of all these adversities, he maintained his literary stability and creativity in matters of philosophical and nationalistic pursuits. He always maintained his clarity of vision and focus in all these matters, which were close to his heart.

=== 1929 – 1944 ===
Having been cast into loneliness and isolation in his family life, S. Wajed Ali, amidst his otherwise busy life with the duties of his job, literary pursuits, chairmanships of various societies and organisations etc., was like a prisoner of pain on a lonely island. At this time he met a learned Burmese lady, who subsequently became his wife and life-partner, Mrs. Badrunnessa Ali. Descended from the line of Chengiz Khan, her father was the head of a Burmese royal family. When the British forces attacked Burma, most of the royal family men folk were killed in the anti-British struggle. Along with her mother and aunt, the Burmese princess Badrunnessa was brought to Calcutta as a royal war-prisoner. Unfortunately, a grave tragedy befell Mr. S. Wajed Ali's life only two years after his marriage, when on 26 October 1931, Mrs. Badrunnessa Ali died a day after the birth of her only child. Her body was buried in the 'Gobra graveyard'. An English nurse was appointed to take care of his new-born child, Sheikh Badruddin Ali (Zaib-un-Nissa was also quite young at the time).

The founding of the magazine Gulistan in December 1932 was an active and busy chapter of S. Wajed Ali's life. He built up around this magazine a cultural and literary circle embracing the cream of contemporary Bengali society. Its cover bore the vision behind its creation 'the pioneer of Hindu-Muslim unity'. The writer's list of Gulistan bears evidence of the nobility, width of scope and seriousness of the magazine: Kazi Nazrul Islam, Dr. Mohammed Shahidullah, Kazi Abdul Wadud, Kedārnāth Chattopādhyāy, Tārāśankar Bandyopādhyāy, Pramathanāth Bishi, Buddhadeb Basu, Sajanikānta Dās (of Śanibārer Chithi fame), Kaviśekhar Kālidās Rāy, Bārindranāth Ghosh, Pabitra Gangopādhyāy, Poet Kader Nawaz, Poet Nirmal Dās, Anurupā Devī, Prabhābatī Devī Sarasvatī, Indirā Devīcaudhurāni, Manilāl Bannerjee, A. K. Jainal Abedin (Navayug), Humayun Kabir, Comrade Abdul Aziz, Phanindranāth Mukhopādhyāy, Dhīrāj Bhattacārya, Saurīndramohan Mukhopadhyāy, Abbasuddin Ahmed etc. At these heady times, S. Wajed Ali's residence at 48, Jhowtalla Road, was the usual venue for the Gulistan-centred literary evening gatherings. The contemporary elite of the intellectual, literary and art world of Calcutta were often present in those sessions. Besides being the founder of the Gulistan magazine, S. Wajed Ali was also the publisher and editor of the English language magazine: Bulletin of the Indian Rationalistic Society.

=== Retirement ===
On 31 October 1945, S. Wajed Ali retired from the position of third presidency magistrate and restarted his independent legal profession. At this time he still resided at his residence at 48, Jhowtolla Road.

S. Wajed Ali was a soft-spoken person with a reserved and contemplative nature. He was a unique and distinctive personality of his time with his aristocratic bearing, wide grasp of knowledge and intellectual pursuits. Regarding his personality Syed Ali Ahsan has justifiably commented: "S. Wajed Ali possessed an exceptionally generous nature. With such a magnanimous, righteous, broad-minded and pleasing personality, he was well loved by all he came into contact with...' 'He had an extraordinary depth of perception'. While never loud nor offensive, he was amusing and extremely well informed in his discussions. He loved talking to children and often listened to their stories, keeping them amused with his special simple magical simplicity and charm. He had some unique pursuits: he loved to walk the streets and parks in Calcutta so much so that he is quoted as having said that ' I am ready to deny myself many things in my life, but I am not ready to give up my pleasure of walking..... I usually like to walk in the Maidan.'. Towards the middle of 1949, S. Wajed Ali was affected with 'cerebral thrombosis', which rendered one side of his body paralysed. He was treated by the German doctor Mr. Troy and cared for by nurses. In these difficult days, his sons looked after him regularly. His younger brother Mr. S. Shamsher Ali visited him every day. His first wife Ayesha Khatun often visited him. Finally, at 9 o' clock of Sunday, 10 June 1951, he died at his 48, Jhowtolla residence. He was buried beside the grave of his last wife Mrs. Badrunnessa Ali at Gobra graveyard in Calcutta, where he had bought the place for himself when she died in 1931, 20 years earlier. Bounded by marble railings, his tombstone bears dates of his birth and death. He is honoured every year in a festival at his birthplace of Baratajpur.

== Bibliography ==
His first Bangla essay 'Otiter Bojha' was published in Shobuj-potro −1919
His short story 'Raja' was published in 'Islam Dorshon' – 1925
He was elected chairman of the 'Bongio Musholman Shahitya Shamity' −1925
He performed the presidential role in the 'Bongio Musholman Shahitya Shamity' and gave the presidential address at the fifth annual conference. -1925
31 July- Attended 'Bongiyo Musholman Shahitya Samity' general meeting and read the paper 'Toruner Kaj'. -1926
December. Re-elected president of the 'Bongiyo Musholman Shahitya Samity'. – 1926
'Gul-dasta '-1927
December- As chairman of the Nazrul Islam National Reception Committee, he presented the address of welcome at the Albert Hall in Calcutta. -1929
'Dorbesher Doa'- 1931
December- S. Wajed Ali founded 'pioneer illustrated magazine of Hindu-Muslim unity' – 'Gulistan' published. -1932
February – Attended as chairman the Sirajgonj held conference of the 'All-Bengal Primary Teacher's Association'. – 1935
July. Attended as president, the first annual festival of the 'Tajpur Institute' and presented the presidential address. -1935
May – Attended as president the 6th Literary Conference of the 'Bongiyo Musholman Shahitya Samity' and presented the theme address. Vice-chairman. Also elected member of the 'Library Committee'. -1939
'Granada'r Sheshbir' – 1941
'Jiboner Shilpo'- 1941
'Prachya o Pratichya'- 1943
'Vobiswater bangalee'-1943
Attended as president the 'All Assam Bangla Language and Literature Conference' and presented the theme address. – 1943
'Badshahi Golpo'-1944
'Golper Mojlis'-1944 `Amar Masjid`_1944 in Weekly Bangali edited by M. Salahuddin(1912_72)

== Noted descendants ==
- Zaib-un-Nissa Hamidullah, his daughter.
- Nafisa Ali, his granddaughter.
- Daud Ali
- Akbar Shahid Ahmed, his great-grandson.
