= Zaib-un-Nissa Hamidullah =

Pakistani writer

- জেবুন্নেসা হামিদুল্লাহ
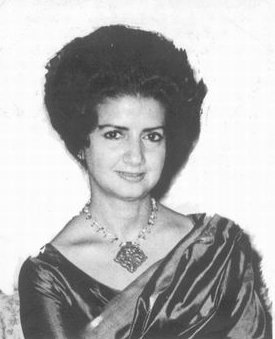
- Zaib-un-Nissa Hamidullah, c. 1970
- Born: 25 December 1918; Calcutta, Bengal Presidency, British India (present-day Kolkata, West Bengal, India)
- Died: 10 September 2000 (aged 81); Karachi, Pakistan
- Occupations: Writer, journalist, publisher
- Spouse: K. M. Hamidullah

Zaib-un-Nissa Hamidullah (Bengali: জেবুন্নেসা হামিদুল্লাহ, Urdu: زیب النساء حمیداللہ; 25 December 1918 – 10 September 2000) was a Pakistani writer and journalist. (Note: Various transliterations exist such as Zeb-un-Nissa, Zaibunnissa, Zaibun Nisa, Zaibunisa, Zaib-un-Nisa, Zebunnissa, Zeb-un-Nisa) Begum Hamidullah was a pioneer of Pakistani literature and journalism in English, and also of feminism in Pakistan. She was Pakistan's first female editor and publisher, and the country's first female columnist writing in English. Zaibunnisa Street in Karachi was named after her.

Before independence in 1947, she wrote for many Indian newspapers, and was the first Muslim woman to write a column in an Indian newspaper. After independence, her column in the newspaper Dawn made her the first female political commentator in Pakistan. After she left Dawn, she became the founder and editor-publisher of the Mirror, the first social glossy magazine in Pakistan. Due to her status as Pakistan's first female editor, she became the first woman to be included in press delegations sent to other countries. On one of these delegations, in 1955, she became the first woman to speak at the ancient al-Azhar University in Cairo, Egypt. She also repeatedly represented Pakistan at the United Nations, including by serving as the deputy chief of the Pakistani delegation to the special 1970 session.

== Early life ==
Zaib-un-Nissa was born in 1918 to a literary family in Calcutta. Her father, S. Wajid Ali, was the first person to translate the writings of the well-known Urdu poet Muhammad Iqbal into Bengali, and was an avid Bengali and Indian nationalist and writer. She had two brothers, and one half-brother from her mother's second marriage. She grew up in a tightly knit Anglo-Indian household filled with Bengali thinkers and philosophers of the age, as her father's house at 48, Jhowtalla Road, was something of a meeting place for the Calcutta literary circle. She started to write at an early age, and received considerable support from both her English mother and Bengali father. A lonely child, Zeb-un-Nissa took to writing poetry as a means to express her thoughts and emotions. Her later writing was affected by her trips to rural areas of Bengal and the Punjab, including her father's birthplace, the Bengal village of Borotajpur (a village near Janai, Hooghly). She was educated at the Loreto House Convent, where she completed her Senior Cambridge qualifications. She published her first poem in The Illustrated Weekly of India in 1933, at age 15. At 18, she won a poetry competition sponsored by England's Daily Mirror for a poem she had published in The Star of India − a publication that later became part of the Dawn group of papers, for which she eventually wrote.

== Marriage ==
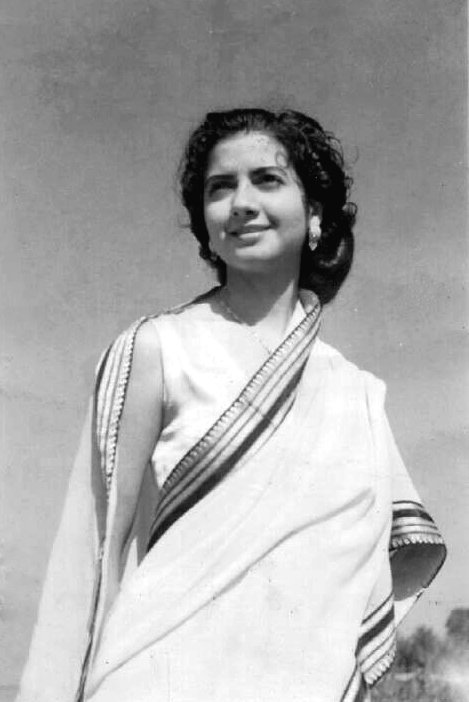
Zeb-un-Nissa Hamidullah, just after her marriage.

In 1940, Zaib-un-Nissa married Khalifa Muhammad Hamidullah. Unlike most marriages of the time, hers was not an arranged marriage. After their marriage, she moved with him to the Punjab Province, where he worked as an executive for the Bata shoe company. During independence in 1947, she and her husband helped refugees coming across the border from India.

Her husband belonged to a well-known Punjabi family. His father, Khalifa Mohammad Asadullah, was the librarian of the Imperial Library in Calcutta (now Kolkata). Hamidullah was the head of Bata's operations in Pakistan, and was sent to head Bata in Ireland in 1972.

All of her books were dedicated to him, proof of their devotion to one another. They had two children, Nilofar (b. 1943) and Yasmine (b. 1949), and six grandchildren, including journalist Akbar Shahid Ahmed.

After moving to the Punjab in 1942, Zaib-un-Nissa was shocked. Raised in an Anglo-Indian household, she found it hard to adjust to the very different lifestyle of her husband's large Punjabi family. It took time for her to adjust, as she admitted in the foreword to The Young Wife.

== Career ==
=== 1936–1943 ===
Zaib-un-Nissa first came into prominence in 1936, when a poem of hers was accepted for publication by Bombay's Illustrated Weekly of India. From then on, she was a regular contributor to that newspaper, until independence in 1947. In 1943, her first book of poetry, Indian Bouquet, was published by her father's publishing house and proved to be very popular. All copies of the first edition were sold in three months. She followed up on her early success with Lotus Leaves, another book of poetry.

=== 1944–1946 ===
In 1945, Zaib-un-Nissa and her husband were in Simla at the time of the Simla Conference. It was here that she met Fatima Jinnah. They became friends, and Jinnah soon managed to get her an exclusive interview with her brother, Muhammad Ali Jinnah. This was a landmark in the young Zaib-un-Nissa's career, and it brought her India-wide fame. Her stories, poems and articles also began to bring her more fame around this time.

=== 1947–1951 ===
After independence in 1947, Zaib-un-Nissa decided to work in the field of journalism, and soon established herself as an outspoken writer in her column "Thru a Woman's Eyes", in the Karachi daily newspaper Dawn. This column began in December 1947. After some time, she rebelled against the limited scope of the feature, declaring that women should have the right to comment on every subject, including politics. Altaf Husain, then editor of Dawn, eventually agreed to give her a wider scope. He recognised the merit of her work by giving her a new assignment – that of a columnist appearing on the editorial page. Zaib-un-Nissa became the first female political commentator of Pakistan. Her column established her reputation as an honest columnist who was not afraid to voice her opinions. It was also a huge step for the women's rights movement in Pakistan.

=== 1951–1956 ===
In 1951, she left Dawn, after editor Altaf Husain demanded that she focus her writing on "issues relating to women," an apparent reference to an earlier message in which he suggested she write about "cooking, child-rearing, and other matters of feminine concern." Hamidullah founded a monthly magazine called the Mirror, and became its editor and publisher in 1952. She became a businesswoman as well as the first female editor and publisher in the nation. Her glossy social pictorial, with its courageous and sincere editorials, was an instant success.

The Mirror became very popular, and Zaib-un-Nissa soon became quite famous as a journalist and editor. The Pakistani government included her in numerous press delegations during this period.

She was one of the founding members of the Pakistani Working Women's Association, as well as a close friend of Fatima Jinnah, sister of Muhammad Ali Jinnah, and Begum Ra'ana Liaquat Ali Khan, wife of Pakistan's first prime minister, Liaquat Ali Khan. Some of her other friends were: Hakeem Saeed, Salima Ahmed, Ardeshir Cowasjee, Syed Hashim Raza and Jahanara Habibullah, the mother of Muneeza Shamsie.

She was a founder member of the Karachi branch of Business and Professional Women's Foundation, and served as its first chapter-president. She held this position for two consecutive terms. She was also the first president of the Women's International Club of Karachi, a member of the Horticultural Society, and first woman-president of the Flower Show Committee. Another organisation Hamidullah played an important role in was the All Pakistan Women's Association, founded by her friend Begum Raana Liaquat Ali Khan.

In 1955, as part of a press delegation to Cairo, she became the first woman to speak at the ancient Al-Azhar University. Her speech was controversial, as she discussed Pakistan's Kashmir issue. However, it was a great distinction for her.

In 1956, Zaib-un-Nissa wrote a travelogue entitled Sixty Days in America, about her trip to the US as part of a World Leaders Program, during which she befriended people like Marilyn Monroe and Jean Negulesco, and appeared on The Ed Sullivan Show. This travelogue consisted of columns she had written for a newspaper, The Times of Karachi, during her trip. The editor, ZA Suleri, gave her permission to reprint the columns in book form as a travelogue which she did.

The following year, she represented Pakistan at the United Nations sponsored seminar on Civic Responsibilities and Increased Participation of Asian Women in Public Life.

=== Ban on the Mirror ===
In 1957, her outspoken criticism of the harsh regime of Major-General Iskander Mirza, and the forced resignation of Huseyn Shaheed Suhrawardy, culminated in a six-month government ban on the Mirror, issued on 9 November. This ban, she was privately informed, would be withdrawn if she publicly apologised. She refused to do this and, on the advice of the well-known lawyer A.K. Brohi, appealed to the Supreme Court of Pakistan.

After Brohi's intervention on her behalf, the Supreme Court passed judgement in her favour(cited as PLD 1958 SC 35), it was a petition under Article 22 of the Constitution of 1956 and was directly entertained by Supreme Court. Through this judgment Section 8 of the Security of Pakistan 1952 was declared violative of fundamental rights as it does not qualify the restriction but leaves it to the discretion of the government. Holding the order of the Central Government illegal and unconstitutional, the government awarded her the costs of petition to Zaib-un-Nissa. This incident made journalistic history, and gave her the distinction of being the first woman journalist to have won a case in the Supreme Court.

=== 1958–1961 ===
In 1958, she published an anthology of her short stories, The Young Wife and Other Stories, which was so popular that second and third editions were printed in 1971 and 1987 respectively. Eminent critics, from newspapers and periodicals both Pakistani and foreign, called some of the stories in it "...the most significant literary productions of Pakistan". It was during this period that her editorials started to become a major feature of the Mirror, and this increased the popularity of both her and her magazine.

In April 1961, Zaib-un-Nissa opened her own publishing house: Mirror Press. Mirror Press, and its subsidiary, Mirror Publications, were charged with printing the Mirror from 1961 onwards. They also did other jobs, but the publishing house remained small.

=== The 1960s ===
The Mirror became a highly controversial magazine in the '60s, mainly due to Zaib-un-Nissa's editorials, which were highly critical of the government's authoritarian form of rule. As her magazine became more and more risqué, Zaib-un-Nissa began to feel that she and her family could soon be in danger. Highly critical of Ayub Khan and his government, Zaib-un-Nissa fell out of governmental favour. As such, the Mirror lost government advertisements and patronage.

During this period, she wrote a series of very critical editorials about Ayub Khan's style of government, starting with "Please, Mr. President!", a very emotional open letter in which she pleaded with him to stop ordering the police to harm students taking part in demonstrations. After Khan replied to the first editorial with a letter in which he dismissed Zaib-un-Nissa as "rashly emotional", the tension steadily increased. The Mirror came close to being banned many times, and was actually banned twice. However, this period of her career came to a climax in the February 1969 edition of the Mirror, in which she published both "Please Mr. President!" and a new editorial, "No, thank you, Sir!". She claimed that the situation had not improved and that "Pakistanis from Peshawar to Chittagong are crying 'out with Ayub!'".

Ayub Khan soon abdicated, ironically doing exactly what she had advised him to do. However, she continued to write critical editorials whenever she felt the government was in need of a rebuke. She also officially began using the name "Zaib-un-Nissa" rather than "Zeb-un-Nissa" in this period to emphasize the correct pronunciation of her Persian name.

=== 1969–1971 ===
Zaib-un-Nissa was Deputy Leader of the Pakistani delegation to the United Nations General Assembly from 1970 to 1971. In 1971, after civil unrest and the subsequent independence of Bangladesh, Zaib-un-Nissa sent a telegram congratulating the new government but chose to remain in Pakistan.

In 1971, Zaib-un-Nissa's husband was transferred to Ireland, to head Bata operations there. As neither of her two daughters was willing to take over the magazine, she closed it down, and sold off her publishing house, Mirror Press.

=== 1971–1979 ===
For most of the 1970s, she and her husband lived in Dublin, Ireland, where he had been transferred. Zaib-un-Nissa put her career on hold to be with her husband, and visited Pakistan regularly. She returned near the end of the decade and began writing a column entitled "Thinking Aloud" for the Pakistani magazine MAG, part of the large Jang Group.

=== 1980–1983 ===
In the early 1980s, she served as president of the All Pakistan Women's Association (APWA), an organisation she had played a major role in since its inception. Still writing columns for the Morning News of Karachi, she continued to comment on the socio-political aspects of Pakistani society. However, she was becoming increasingly reclusive.

=== Retirement ===
In 1983, Zaib-un-Nissa's husband had a heart attack, and he died the next year. On the day of his funeral, she wrote what was to become the most famous article of her later career. This introspective piece was published in the Morning News the day after her husband's death.

She was plunged into sadness following her husband's death, and soon retired from an active writing life. Disenchanted with the new generation of Pakistanis, Zaib-un-Nissa fell into seclusion and soon moved in with her daughter, choosing to spend her remaining years with her family. She retired from an active career, and only wrote occasional articles during the 1980s.

In 1987, however, she was plunged into the public eye once again, when her book of short stories, The Young Wife and Other Stories, was republished due to popular demand. Yet this late fame did not last very long, and she soon went back into seclusion.

== Death ==
Zaib-un-Nissa died on 10 September 2000, at the age of 81. She had been rushed to the hospital on the 9th, but died in the early hours of the 10th, due to water in her lungs.

An obituary in 'Dawn' newspaper said, "even her detractors admired her for the courage of conviction and the strength of character she displayed throughout her life." Another newspaper obituary said, "She will be long remembered for her pioneering role in a certain genre of journalism in Pakistan, and as a powerful and courageous writer."

In the 1960s, the government named a major street in the Karachi city centre after her: Zaibunnisa Street.

=== Legacy ===
After Zaib-un-Nissa's death, her copyright passed to her younger daughter, Yasmine S. Ahmed. This included the right to all her pictures, works, etc. Due to popular demand, a fourth edition of The Young Wife and Other Stories was published by Oxford University Press, Pakistan in August 2008.

== Bibliography ==
- Indian Bouquet, 1941 – Gulistan Publishing House, Calcutta.
- Lotus Leaves, 1946 – The Lion Press, Lahore.
- Sixty Days in America, 1956 (2nd edition: 1957) – Mirror Publications, Karachi.
- The Young Wife, 1958 (2nd edition: 1971; 3rd edition: 1987; 4th edition: 2008, by Oxford University Press) – Mirror Publications, Karachi.
- The Flute of Memory, 1964 – Mirror Publications, Karachi.
- Poems, 1972 – Mirror Publications, Karachi.

== See also ==
- List of Pakistani journalists
- List of Pakistani writers
