= 1973 Pakistan coup attempt =

- Part of Military coups in Pakistan
Date	1973
Location	Pakistan
Result	Failed coup: Coup plotters arrested

Belligerents
Government of Pakistan	Fraction of the Army; Fraction of the PAF

Commanders and leaders
Zulfiqar Ali Bhutto (Prime minister of Pakistan)	Brig. F.B Ali; Major Farouk Adam Khan; Squadron Leader Ghous; Colonel Aleem Afridi (Double agent); Lt. Colonel Tariq Rafi

The 1973 Pakistan coup attempt, also known as the Attock Conspiracy, refers to a plot by Brig. Ali, Major Farouk Adam Khan, Squadron Leader Ghous, Colonel Aleem Afridi and Lt. Colonel Tariq Rafi against the government of Zulfiqar Ali Bhutto to overthrow the government and establish a revolutionary military junta.

== Background ==
Zulfiqar Ali Bhutto's Pakistan People's Party (PPP) had come to power in December 1971 the independence of Bangladesh from Pakistan as PPP had won majority seats in the 1970 elections in the then West Pakistan.

== Previous role of the plotters ==
The coup was plotted by the same group of officers who had actually helped Bhutto to come to power after the Bangladesh Liberation War, these officers forced Yahya Khan to resign and transfer power to Bhutto, by threatening an officer's coup if he didn't comply. Yahya Khan resigned.

== Cause ==
However Bhutto after coming to power started dismissing these activist officers as he was weary of them. These officers were enraged and the rebel group of officers began to plot a coup against Bhutto with the help of sympathetic people in the military apparatus.

== Coup plotters ==
One of the core plotters was Brigadier F B. Ali. He was originally amongst the supporters of Bhutto who had forced Yahya Khan to resign and transfer power to Bhutto. But after his dismissal and dismissal of many of his colleagues he turned against the government and he along with Major Farouk Adam Khan, Squadron Leader Ghous, Colonel Aleem Afridi and Lt. Colonel Tariq Rafi began plotting a coup to bring down Bhutto regime.

== Form of government ==
They were trying to establish a revolutionary military junta by officers who would oversee the removal of the generals promoted to high positions by Bhutto.
