= James Sutherland Cotton =

British writer and editor (1847–1918)

James Sutherland Cotton (born 17 July 1847 at Coonoor, Madras; died 10 July 1918 at Salisbury) was a British intellectual. He edited The Academy and wrote and compiled various books and publications on Indian life and history.

== Biography ==
He was the third son of Joseph John Cotton, of the Madras Civil Service, his mother being a daughter of James Minchin, Master in Equity of the Supreme Court at Madras. Henry Cotton, the liberal MP, was his brother. After being at school successively at Magdalen College School and Brighton College, he went to Winchester, in 1860, and became a colleger there in the following year and in 1867, he was elected a scholar of Trinity College, Oxford, where he graduated in 1870, after a first-class in Classical Moderations and a first in 'Literæ Humaniores'. From 1871 to 1874 he was a Fellow and Lecturer of Queen's College. Among his Oxford friends and contemporaries were E. W. B. Nicholson, Bodley's Librarian, F. T. Richards, first of Queen's and afterwards of Trinity, and Grant Allen of Merton, and he was in pronounced sympathy with the rather uncompromising views of that academic and philosophic Liberalism which had set in strongly years before.

In 1874 he was called to the Bar of Lincoln's Inn, and in 1881 he began the editing of The Academy, a critical journal, which under his guidance became noted for its signed reviews and scholarly criticism. After 15 years of editorship, Cotton left it to other hands.

For many years he was the principal assistant of William Wilson Hunter in his manifold literary undertakings in exposition of Indian life and history. He helped Hunter to compile the first general gazetteer of India, published in nine volumes in 1881, and to revise and expand it in a second edition of 14 volumes in 1885–87. His chief work in the last few years was the cataloguing of the European manuscripts relating to India in the India Office Library.

Cotton and Isabella, daughter of John Carter, of Clifton, Bristol, were married in 1873. She survived him.
