= Dark Mirror =

Dark Mirror or The Dark Mirror may refer to:

== Films ==
- The Dark Mirror (1920 film), a silent drama starring Dorothy Dalton
- The Dark Mirror (1946 film), a psychological thriller directed by Robert Siodmak starring Olivia de Havilland
- Dark Mirror (1984 film), a television film starring Stephen Collins
- Dark Mirror (2007 film), a film directed by Pablo Proenza, starring Lisa Vidal

== Literature ==
- The Dark Mirror, a 1920 novel by Louis Joseph Vance
- The Dark Mirror, a 1966 Michael Faraday crime fiction novel by Basil Copper
- "Dark Mirror", a 1993 short story in the R. A. Salvatore bibliography
- Dark Mirror (Duane novel), a 1994 novel by Diane Duane based on the American TV series Star Trek
- Dark Mirror (Gardner novel), a 2004 novel by Craig Shaw Gardner based on the American TV series Angel
- The Dark Mirror (Marillier novel), a 2004 historical fantasy in The Bridei Chronicles series by Juliet Marillier
- X-Men: Dark Mirror, a 2005 novel by Marjorie Liu

== Other uses ==
- Syphon Filter: Dark Mirror, a PlayStation 2 and PlayStation Portable video game
- a 2020 book by Barton Gellman, Dark Mirror: Edward Snowden and the American Surveillance State

== See also ==
- "In a Mirror, Darkly", a 2005 episode of Star Trek Enterprise
- A Scanner Darkly, a 1977 science fiction novel by Philip K. Dick, and a 2006 film
- Black Mirror (disambiguation)
