= Zerkalo =

Zerkalo, which means "mirror" in Russian, may refer to:

- Mirror (1975 film), called Zerkalo in Russian, directed by Andrei Tarkovsky
- Zerkalo (film festival), a film festival named after Tarkovsky's film
- Zerkalo.io, or Zerkalo, the superseding news and media service succeeding Tut.By in Belarus in 2022

== See also ==
- Dzerkalo Tyzhnia, a defunct Ukrainian newspaper
- Zerkalo dushi, an album by Russian singer Alla Pugacheva
