= The Star (Pakistan) =

English-language newspaper in Pakistan

The Star News
- Type: Daily newspaper
- Format: Broadsheetu
- Owner: Dawn Group of Newspapers
- Founder: Surendranath Banerjee
- Publisher: Pakistan Herald Publications (Pvt.) Limited
- Founded: 17 August 1932
- Ceased publication: 2005
- Political alignment: Pro-Muslim, supported the creation of Pakistan
- Language: English
- Headquarters: Karachi, Pakistan
- Sister newspapers: Dawn
- Website: https://www.thestarnews.org/

The Star News was an influential English-language evening newspaper that was part of Pakistan's journalistic landscape for several decades. With its rich history, the paper played a key role in reflecting and shaping the political and social narrative of the region, particularly in the years leading up to the creation of Pakistan.

== Early history ==
The paper was the successor to a daily founded by Surendranath Banerjea who had died in 1925. This evening daily was called The Bengalee. It was bought by the founders of The Star of India who started publishing on the same premises in Calcutta on 17 August 1932. Watson describes it as 'the first daily paper championing the Muslim cause and printed in English ... to appear in the city'. It was similar in importance to such famous Muslim predecessor newspapers as Aligarh Institute Gazette, The Moslem Chronicle, Comrade, Zamindar and Mussalman but was always disregarded by both research and authorities as it was both too 'Calcuttan' for the Bengali Muslims and too 'Bengali' for the Northern and Western Muslims.

However, it rarely covered issues related to the Pakistan Movement. It was more interested in entertainment, light news and even modern consuming, a typical emanation from the owners' interests as they all belonged to the local Muslim Chamber of Commerce, for example the Ispahani family, Ross Masood and Ghaznavi. It later included a weekly in Bengali called Muhammadi, a daily in Bengali, called Azad, and an Urdu weekly called Zamana all headed by Akram Khan. It appears also to have had strong links with the Muslim Bengali press in Dhaka in the 1930s or 1940s. Jinnah's Delhi Dawn was deeply inspired by The Star of India's professionalism.

The Star of India represented nearly 10% of the readership in Calcutta at its peak. It had six extremely different editors: Horace Franks: 1932–36, Lawrence Atkinson: 1936–41, Pothan Joseph: 1941–42, Mahmud Husain: 1942–44, Usman Ahmad Ansari: 1944–48, Rezaur Rahman Khan: 1948–49. Pothan Joseph edited the paper in the 1940s. Following the Lahore Resolution, he reoriented The Star's editorial stance to favour a separate Muslim nation.

A number of significant figures in early Pakistan and the Pakistan Movement contributed to the paper, including Abul Hassan Ispahani, Mirza Ahmad Ispahani, and Adamjee Haji Dawood. Nawab Khwaja Habibullah, Sir Khwaja Nazimuddin, H. S. Suhrawardy, Mahmudabad and Zaib-un-Nissa Hamidullah also contributed. Altaf Husain published under the pseudonym 'A Mofussil Muslim'; Raghib Assan, an associate of Muhammad Iqbal, frequently wrote for the paper. In 1933, the paper published an article titled 'Grievances of Bengal Muslims', which was cited by S. C. Mitra to Harry Graham Haig in a question time session of the Central Legislative Assembly. AF Rahman, Abul Hashim, MF Rahman, Abul Mansur Ahmad also wrote famous articles, and Zaib-un-Nissa Hamidullah published an award-winning poem in the paper at age 18.

The paper was moved by the Haroon family to Karachi in 1949 and began publishing there—as the Dawn's evening edition—in August 1949 and was renamed The Star. In 1954, Julian Huxley debated the Soviet biologist Nuzdin, a supporter of the views of Trofim Lysenko, in Karachi. Star staff assisted Huxley in his preparations for the debate. The paper folded in 2005.

== Modern era ==
The Star was part of the Dawn Media Group, published by Pakistan Herald Publications (Pvt.) Limited (PHPL).

Imran Aslam, now President of Geo TV, edited The Star in the 1980s.

== Sources ==
- DiCostanzo, Thierry (9 February 2012). "Use and Re-Use of 'Pakistan' in the Indian Muslim Press (1932–47)". In Hegewald, Julia A. B.; Mitra, Subrata K. (eds.). Re-Use: The Art and Politics of Integration and Anxiety. New Delhi: SAGE Publications India. ISBN 978-81-321-0981-5.
- Fazila-Yacoobali, Vazira (1999). "A rite of passage: The partition of history and the Dawn of Pakistan". Interventions. 1 (2): 183–200. doi:10.1080/13698019900510301. ISSN 1369-801X.
