= Mirror (Pakistani magazine) =

Pakistani Magazine

November 1963 issue of the Mirror

The Mirror of the Month, better known as the Mirror, was a popular Pakistani social magazine which ran from 1951 to 1972. Its editor, founder and publisher was Zaib-un-Nissa Hamidullah (or, as she was known then, Zeb-un-Nissa Hamidullah). As editor of the Mirror, Begum Hamidullah became the first woman editor in Pakistan. The Mirror was published monthly.

== History ==
Zeb-un-Nissa Hamidullah founded the Mirror in October, 1951; after she left Dawn. Her mission statement was to "foster feelings of unity and amity throughout the country". Most of her initial capital came from her husband and her family, and they soon rented two rooms at the Hotel Metropole in Karachi. The magazine was originally published at Din Muhammadi Press, as Hamidullah did not get her own press until the 1960s.

It was Pakistan's first social pictorial, and soon achieved popularity in both wings of the state. It had pictures and articles about society in Pakistan, and advice columns. However, it soon grew to be more than just a social glossy. Begum Hamidullah began writing serious editorials, which contained her by-line on the current economic and political problems in the country. The editor held several jobs in the magazine, doing everything from proof-reading to picture editing, as she revealed in her interview with Asif Noorani in 1997.

=== 1957 ban ===
In November 1957, Begum Zeb-un-Nissa Hamidullah, the Mirror's editor, wrote a blistering and opinionated editorial in defence of Huseyn Shaheed Suhrawardy, whose ministry in East Pakistan had been abruptly forced to resign due to threats from Iskander Mirza. In retaliation, the central government imposed a six-month ban on the magazine and privately threatened its editor. Begum Hamidullah responded by taking the government to the Supreme Court and, with the help of eminent lawyer A.K Brohi, managed to win. The Mirror was awarded the costs of the petition, and the incident made journalistic history in Pakistan, as it was the first case of a woman journalist appearing successfully before the highest court in the land.

=== Mirror Press ===
In April 1961, Begum Hamidullah began her own publishing house to publish the Mirror. Named Mirror Press, it published the magazine from 1961 till its closure 10 years later, and also published a few other books as Mirror Publications. When Begum Hamidullah closed the Mirror and left for Ireland in 1971, Mirror Press was sold to an outside party. Though still alive, the company is no longer functional.

=== Controversy in the sixties ===
In October 1962, Begum Hamidullah wrote an open letter to President Ayub Khan. Entitled 'Please Mr. President!", it expressed concern about the government's treatment of student protests. The letter was published in the Mirror. It was an emotional statement, describing the feelings of the people of Pakistan, as they saw "the blood that stained the streets of Pakistan". She stated that, owing to his authoritarian style of rule, she was losing her faith in him and had placed his picture upside down.

In the November edition of the Mirror that year, she published his reply; a breakdown of the statements in her letter, each being justified. He concluded by saying "I request [you] to ascertain facts before publishing highly emotional editorials".

In 1969, before he stepped down, she republished "Please Mr. President!", alongside a new editorial, "No, thank you, Sir", in which she said that the problems which she talked about in "Please, Mr. President!" were still very much there, and that "Pakistan will continue to erupt to erupt as long as you, Field Marshal Ayub Khan, remain its President." This editorial angered Ayub Khan, but, ironically, he took her advice in the end, and abdicated in favour of General Yahya Khan.

Because of these events, the Mirror became highly controversial in the '60s. The tension between Begum Hamidullah and Ayub Khan escalated, resulting in the magazine being banned twice, and government advertisements being almost completely revoked from the periodical.

However, it was also during this period that Begum Hamidullah acquired her own Mirror Press, and founded a small publishing house, Mirror Publications.

=== Closure ===
In 1971, Begum Hamidullah moved to Ireland with her husband, and the magazine folded the next year. It heralded the end of an era. As one Pakistani journalist put it, "The paper closed down...after twenty-one years of struggle against authoritarian trends in our government and bigotry and fanaticism in society...the closure of the paper was, thus, a big loss to Pakistani journalism."

Hamidullah later clarified in interviews that it was a closure more out of necessity than choice: she wanted one of her daughters to take over, but neither obliged. As a result, her departure meant the end of the groundbreaking magazine.

== Features ==
The Mirror contained many features which were repeated in nearly all the editions. Those were:

=== Speaking Seriously ===
This feature contained Begum Zeb-un-Nissa Hamidullah's controversial editorials, which brought much fame and controversy to the magazine.

=== Junior's Corner ===
Hosted by the mysterious and kind Apa Jan and containing letters and stories by children, this feature earned many fans in both East and West Pakistan, who joined a club called 'The Mirror League'.

=== Dulha-Dulhan ===
This featured consisted of two pages of pictures of newly-wed couples in both the wings of Pakistan.

=== The Mirror reflects the World ===
This feature contained pictures and articles about Pakistani dignitaries and diplomats around the globe.

=== Social Notes ===
The magazine's largest feature, this section was devoted to the social doings of Pakistani society. There were many different ingenious headings for featured cities thought up by Begum Hamidullah, such as 'Karachi Chronicle', 'Capital Calling', 'Culled from Quetta' and 'Dacca Doings'.

== Criticism ==
Although popular, the Mirror was criticised by many people as being too frivolous. The intelligentsia said it was merely a social glossy, with no importance apart from the editorials. Despite this, it gained a large following in both East and West Pakistan. When asked about the criticism, and her reaction to it in 1997 interview, Begum Hamidullah said that the Mirror "was just for light reading".

== See also ==
- Zaib-un-Nissa Hamidullah
