= Rainbow Centre, Karachi =

Shopping center in Karachi, Pakistan

The Rainbow Centre is a shopping center in Karachi, Sindh, Pakistan. Rainbow Centre is located adjacent to the Empress Market. It is famous as the hub of video entertainment in Pakistan and the country's video piracy industry. Located in the area of Saddar, it is reported to be the largest CD and DVD market in Pakistan.

In 2000, it was estimated that more than half of the 350–400 shops housed in the Rainbow Centre were exclusively engaged in video piracy.

In addition to CDs, the centre makes DVDs of Urdu and DVDs Blu-Rays of English movies, dramas, TV serials, cartoons, anime, sitcoms, and DVDs of PC Computer games and Applications and DVD + Blu-rays of Xbox / PlayStation Console Games and so on.

== See also ==
- Copyright protection in Pakistan
- Pornography in Pakistan
