= James Strachan =

James Strachan may refer to:

- James Strachan (Australian politician) (1810–1875), Australian politician and merchant
- James Strachan (educator) (1883–1973), New Zealand school principal
- James Strachan (ice hockey) (1876–1939), Canadian ice hockey executive
- James Strachan (programmer), developer of the Apache Groovy programming language
- James Frederick Strachan (1894–1978), Scottish judge
- James McGill Strachan (1808–1870), lawyer, business and political figure in Canada West
- James Strachan (engineer) (died 1917), Scottish civil engineer, municipal engineer of Karachi
