= Copyright law of Pakistan =

The basic legal instrument governing copyright law in Pakistan is the Copyright Ordinance, 1962 as amended by the Copyright (Amendment) Ordinance, 2000.

== Copyright Ordinance, 1962 ==
=== Objects of copyright ===
According to section 10 copyright subsists in

- literary works (including computer programmes; excluding speeches)
- dramatic works
- musical works (i.e. any combination of melody and harmony or either of them, produced or reproduced graphically)
- records (i.e. any disc, tape, wire, perforated roll or other device in which sounds are embodied)
- artistic works (i.e. painting, sculpture, drawing, engraving or a photograph, an architectural work of art and any other work of artistic craftsmanship)
- cinematographic works

and includes compilations (s. 3 subs. 3).

Foreign works are covered by section 54 read with the International Copyright Order, 1968.

=== Owner of copyright ===
The first owner of copyright in general is the author (exceptions: works for hire, Government works; s. 13).

The owner of copyright may assign the copyright (s. 14) or grant any interest in the copyright by license (s. 35). Licenses may also be granted by the Copyright Board to republish a work withheld from the public (s. 36).

Registration of copyright with the Copyright Office is not obligatory, but if registration has taken place the Register of Copyrights gives prima facie evidence of the particulars entered therein (s. 42).

=== Term of copyright ===
Copyright in a literary, dramatic, musical or artistic work published within the lifetime of the author subsists until 50 years from the beginning of the calendar year next following the year in which the author dies (p.m.a.; s. 18).

Copyright in a cinematographic work, a record or a photograph subsists until 50 years from the beginning of the calendar year next following the publication of the work (s. 20).

If a work is not published within 50 years after the death of the author or, the author being unknown, within 50 years after its creation, it falls into the public domain (s. 23)

=== Meaning of copyright ===
Copyright means inter alia the exclusive right

- to reproduce the work
- to publish the work
- to perform or broadcast the work
- to make any translation or adaption of the work (for details see s. 3).

When an author assigns the rights in the intellectual property, he does not assign his moral rights (s. 62).

=== Copyright infringement ===
When copyright is infringed (s. 56), the owner of copyright (as well as the exclusive licensee) is entitled to certain civil remedies (injunction, damages, accounts; s. 60), either before the Court of the District Judge or the Copyright Board (s. 65; cf. ss. 46, 78). If the owner of the copyright is unable to institute immediate regular legal proceedings the owner or any other person having an interest in the copyright in the work may apply for immediate provisional orders (s. 60A).

Infringing copies are deemed to be the property of the owner of the copyright, who accordingly may take proceedings for the recovery of possession thereof or in respect of the conversion thereof (s. 63). Infringing copies may not be imported or exported (s. 65A) and may be seized by the police (s. 73).

Copyright infringement may also lead to criminal charges (ss. 66 to 71) to be tried by no court inferior to that of a Magistrate of the first class (s. 72). The Federal Investigation Agency can take cognizance of such cases where violation of some Government work is involved.

=== No infringement ===
Certain acts are said not to constitute an infringement of copyright (s. 57). These include inter alia

- fair dealing with a literary, dramatic, musical or artistic work for the purpose of research, private study, criticism, review (cl. a) or reporting current events (cl. b)
  - in relation to a literary or dramatic work in prose: single extract up to 400 words, or a series of extracts (with comments interposed) up to a total of 800 words with no one extract exceeding 300 words (expl. i)
  - in relation to a literary or dramatic work in poetry: extract up to a total of 40 lines and in no case exceeding one fourth of the whole (expl. ii)
- the reproduction or adaptation of a literary, dramatic, musical or artistic work by a teacher or a pupil for the purpose of instruction or examination (cl. h)
- the performance of a literary, dramatic or musical work by the staff and students of an educational institution (cl. i)
- the making of up to 3 copies of a book by a public or non-profit library for its use if such book is not available for sale (cl. o)
- the reproduction or publication of certain Government works (unless prohibited; cl. q)
- freedom of panorama: the making or publishing of a painting, drawing, engraving or photograph of an architectural work of art (cl. r) or a sculpture or other artistic work if such work is permanently situated in a public place (cl. s)

=== Related rights ===
Related rights include the rights of performers and producers of phonograms (s. 24A; term: 50 years), of broadcasting organizations (s. 24; term: 25 years) and of publishers relating to the typographical arrangement of their editions (s. 28; term: 25 years).

=== Other provisions ===
- particulars to be included in records and video films (s. 57A)
- legal deposit of books (s. 47) as well as periodicals and newspapers (s. 48) with public libraries (National Library of Pakistan)

== Economic, political and diplomatic implications ==
Copyright protection in Pakistan is a major economic, political and diplomatic issue.

In a country like Pakistan where laws are very difficult to implement, copyright infringement has always been a concern, and the country has been on the Special 301 Watch List since 1989.

=== Legislative response ===
Pakistan updated its copyright law with amendments in 1992. However, no significant progress against pervasive copyright piracy was made until 1994, when raids against video piracy began. The International Intellectual Property Alliance recommended last year that Pakistan remain on the Watch List, and USTR agreed, while noting "greater efforts to combat copyright piracy".

=== Loss estimates due to "Piracy" ===
Head	Loss
Motion Pictures:	$10 million
Sound Recordings and Musical Compositions:	$5.0 million
Computer Programs:	$50 Millions
Business Software:	N/A
Entertainment Software:	N/A
Books:	$30.0 million
TOTAL LOSSES	$45.0+ million

== See also ==
- Federal Investigation Agency
- Rainbow Centre Karachi – a market building famous for video piracy
- List of parties to international copyright treaties
