= Saddar =

Neighbourhood in Karachi

Saddar صدر
- Locality
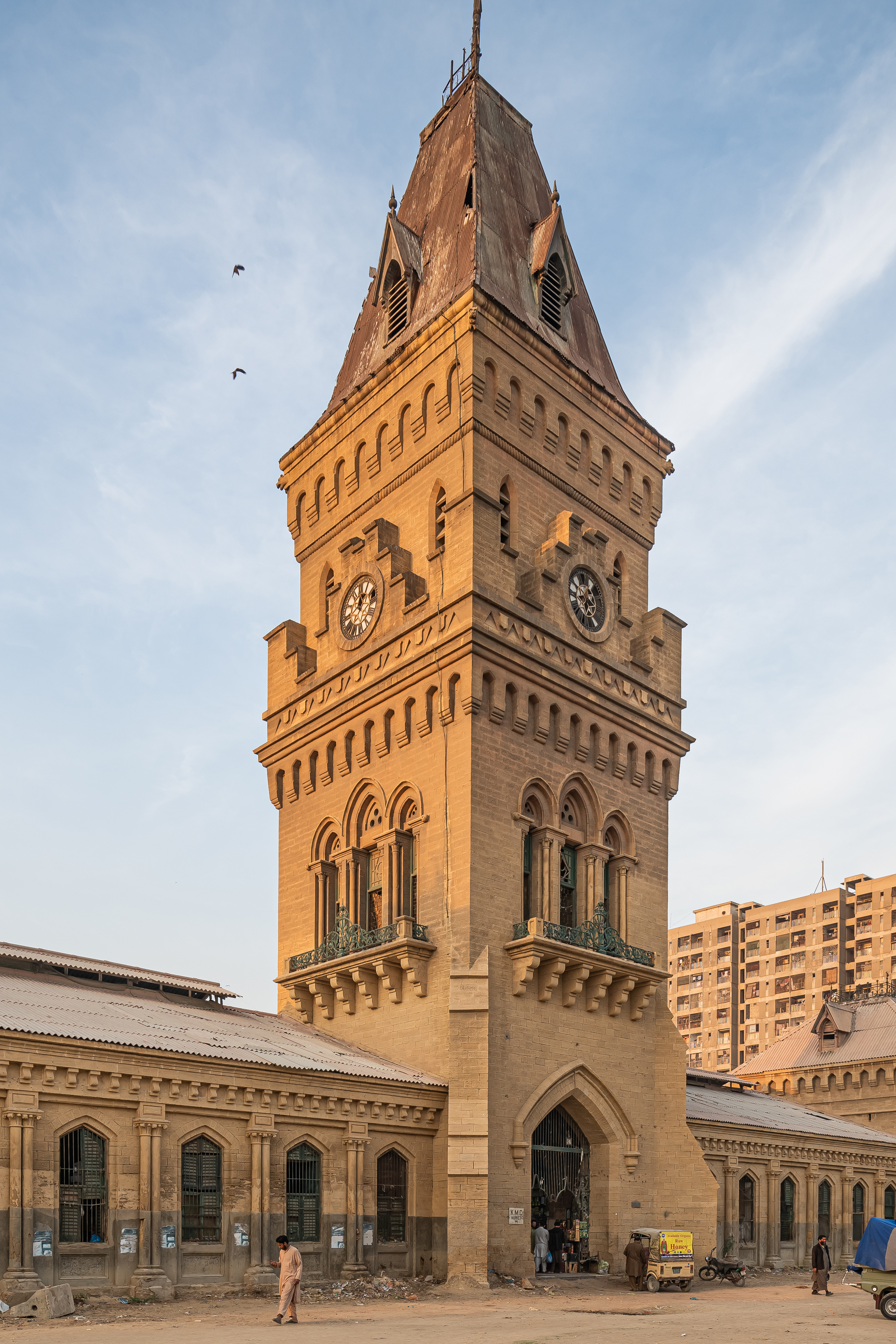
- Empress Market
- Interactive map of Saddar
- Coordinates: 24°51′38″N 67°1′54″E
- Country: Pakistan
- Province: Sindh
- City District: Karachi
- Established: 1839
- Boroughs: List: Bohri Bazaar, Preedy Quarters

Government
  - Type: Union Councils
  - Constituency: NA-247 (Karachi South-II) (PTI)
  - National Assembly Member: Aftab Siddiqui

Saddar (Urdu: صدر), also known as Saddar Bazaar, is a neighbourhood in Karachi, Pakistan. The locality was developed as the primary commercial district during the period of British-era rule in Karachi. As a result, Saddar contains the large concentration of colonial-era architecture in Karachi.

== History ==
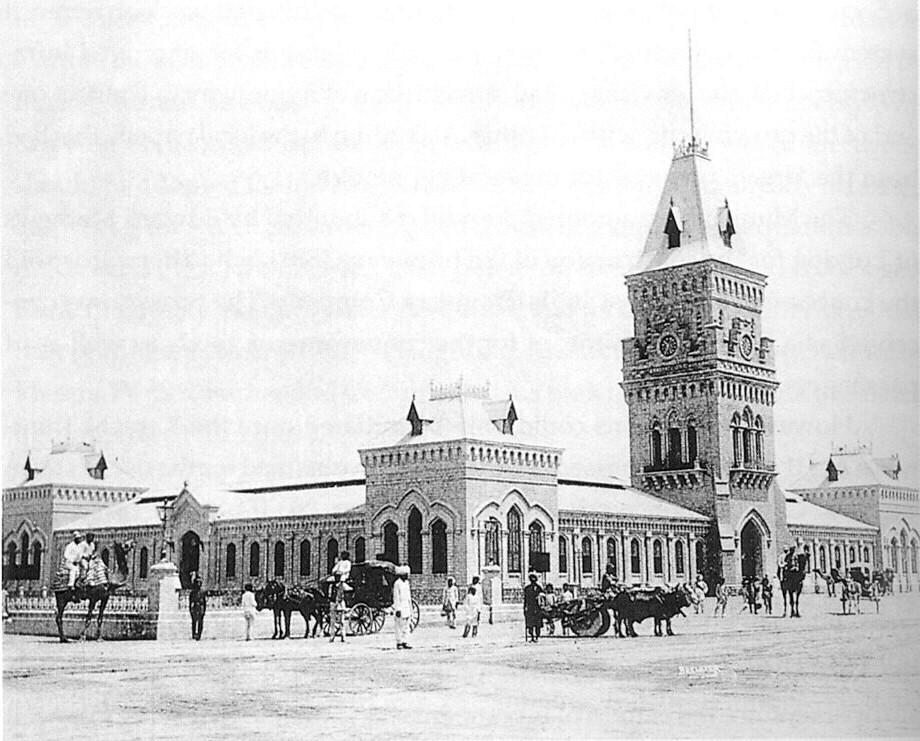
Empress Market in 1890

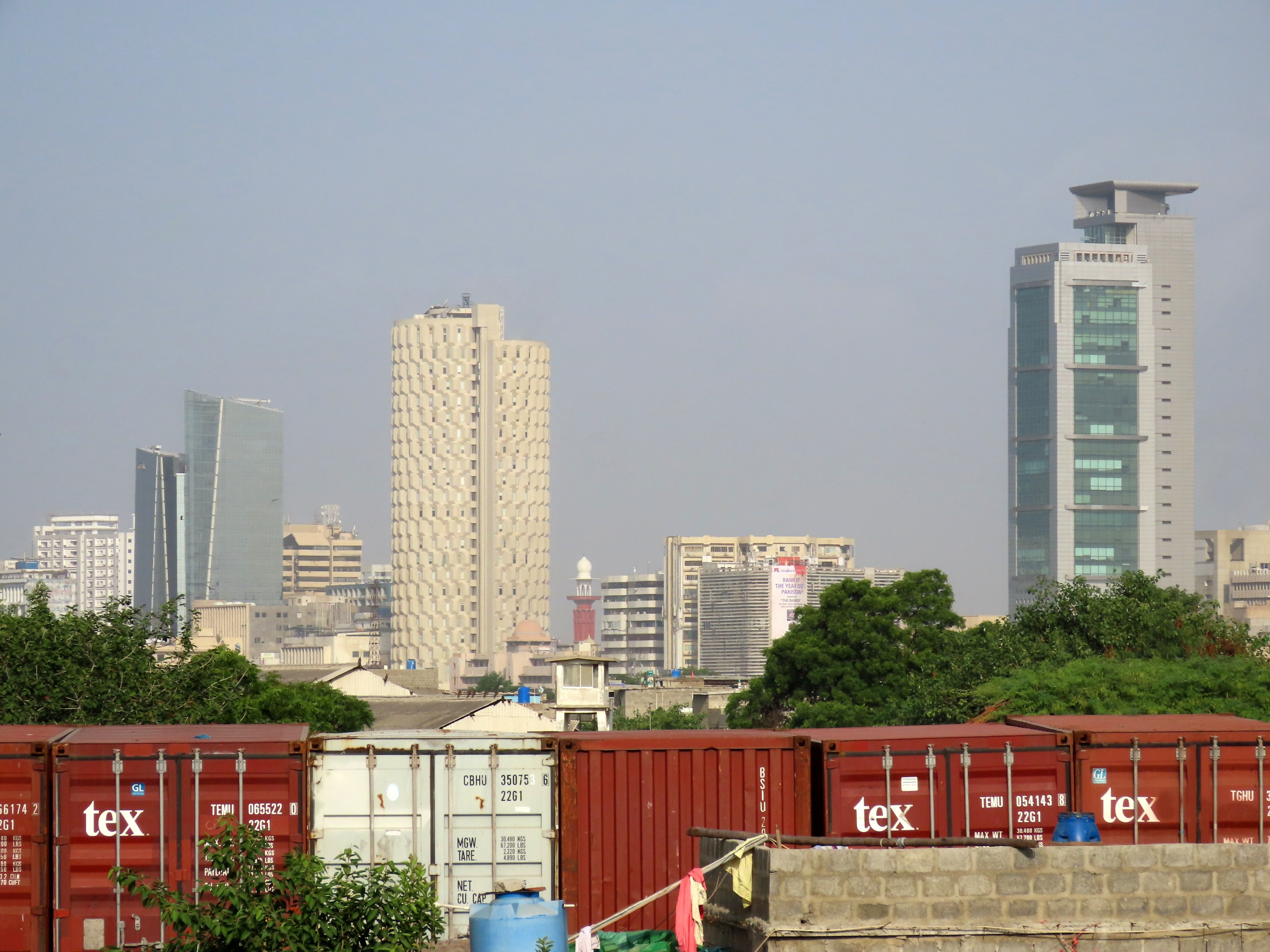
Highrise buildings on II Chundrigar Road.

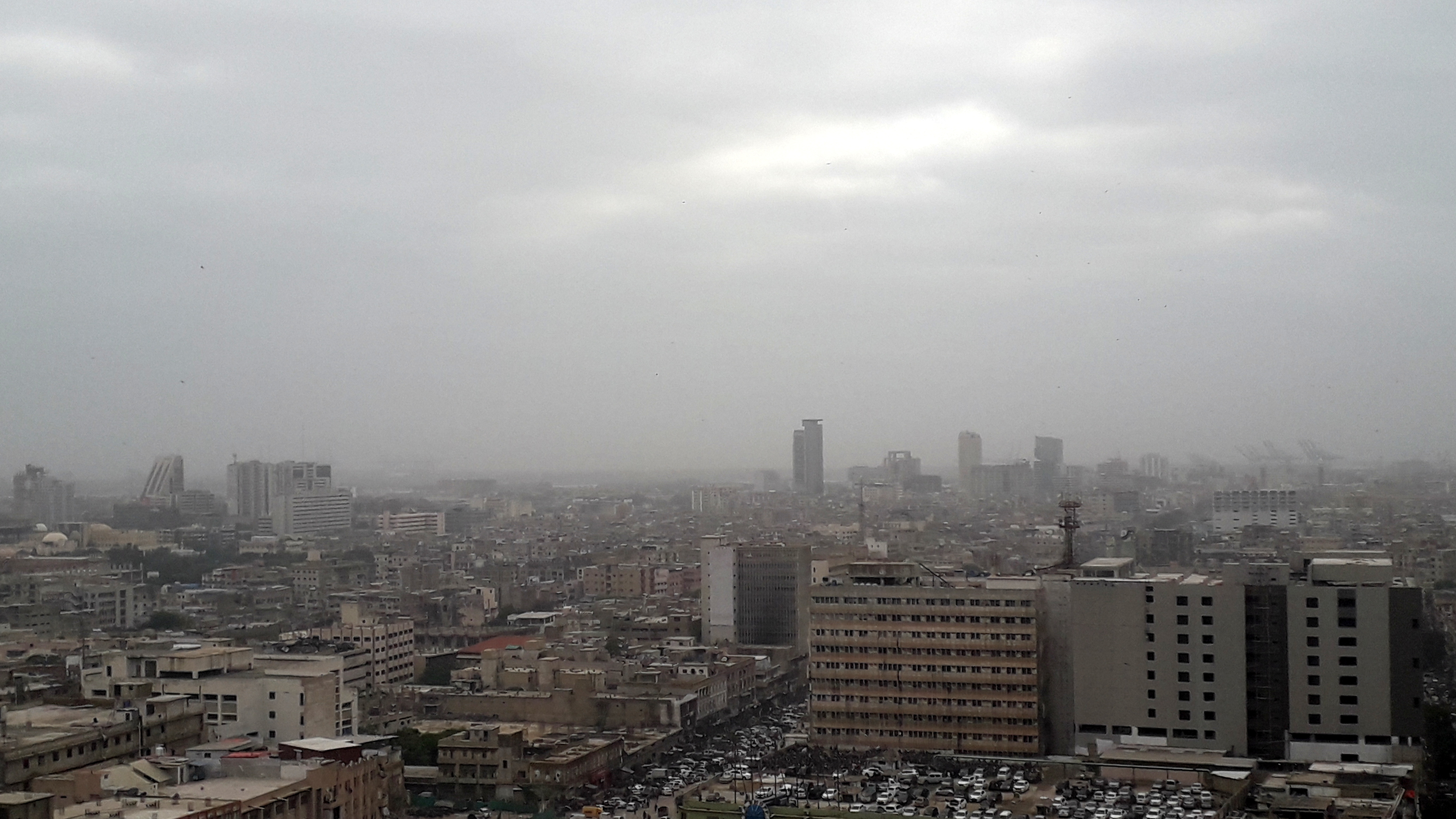
Aerial view of Sadar District.

Saddar was established by the British in 1839 as a commercial district for Karachi's European population, to the east of the bazaars of old Karachi in Mithadar, Kharadar, and Jodia Bazaar which served the native population. Following the annexation of Sindh in 1843, Saddar became the location of administrative and military functions. Following the Mutiny of 1857, rebels were executed at by being blown from the mouths of cannons at Saddar's military parade grounds.

Karachi's most elite Catholic institutions were quickly established in Karachi: St Patrick's High School and St Joseph's Convent High School, wereset up in 1861 and 1862 respectively. The Edulji Dinshaw Dispensary was established in 1882. The "McKenzie Pavilion Grounds", now known as Jehangir Park, was established in 1883. Empress Market was established at the site of the execution grounds in 1889, and was originally meant to serve British administrators, soldiers, and their families. The area around the market saw the establishment of posh bars, cafes, and restaurants, such as the Saddar Tea Rooms, Elphinstone Restaurant, the old Todi shop and Café Parisian. A dress-code was enforced in the posh Saddar area, leading it to be eventually known as the "European Quarter" of Karachi. Following independence in 1947, Saddar remained a centre of multi-class interaction. Bars, clubs, and business catering to different social classes co-existed in the area. Several institutions of higher learning were within walking distance, including D. J. Sindh Government Science College, and Sindh Muslim Law College, and Regal Bazar became home to a weekly book market that still takes place. Saddar was also within easy walking distance from government institutions to the east of Saddar, and Civil Lines to the south. The most important churches in Karachi are located in Saddar, as well as Karachi's biggest Parsi fire temple.

Following the abolishment of alcohol by Zulfikar Ali Bhutto in the early 1970s in an attempt to appease conservative forces, Saddar's nightlife scene was decimated. In 1977, dictator Muhammad Zia-ul-Haq instituted an Islamization agenda that was opposed by the city's wealthy and westernized elite. These classes withdrew from much of public life in Saddar, and instead established exclusive social clubs in Karachi's wealthy residential districts. As a result, Saddar's commercial markets began to serve only lower and lower-middle classes. The area remained a large commuter hub, and so hawker stalls began encroaching on sidewalks in order to cater to the growing number of commuters.

A large multiplex cinema was established in the early 2000s, leading to a small wave of gentrification in the area. In 2019, in an effort to "clean up" the Empress Market, all stalls outside of the market which had been established in the plaza around the market were demolished in a controversial move.

== Gallery ==
The following are heritage buildings in Saddar which are protected by the Government of Sindh:

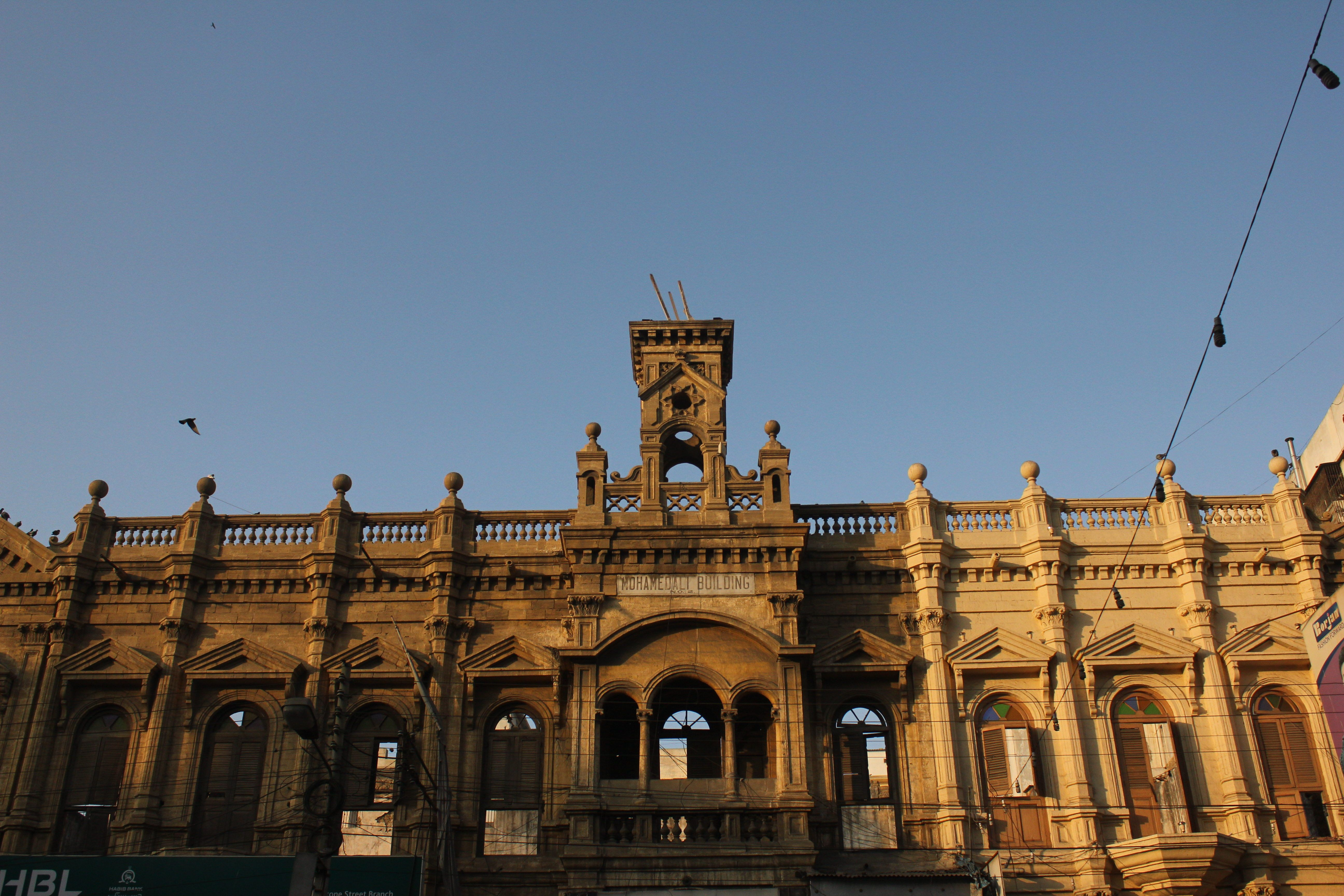
The Mohamedali building is located on Zaibunnisa Street.

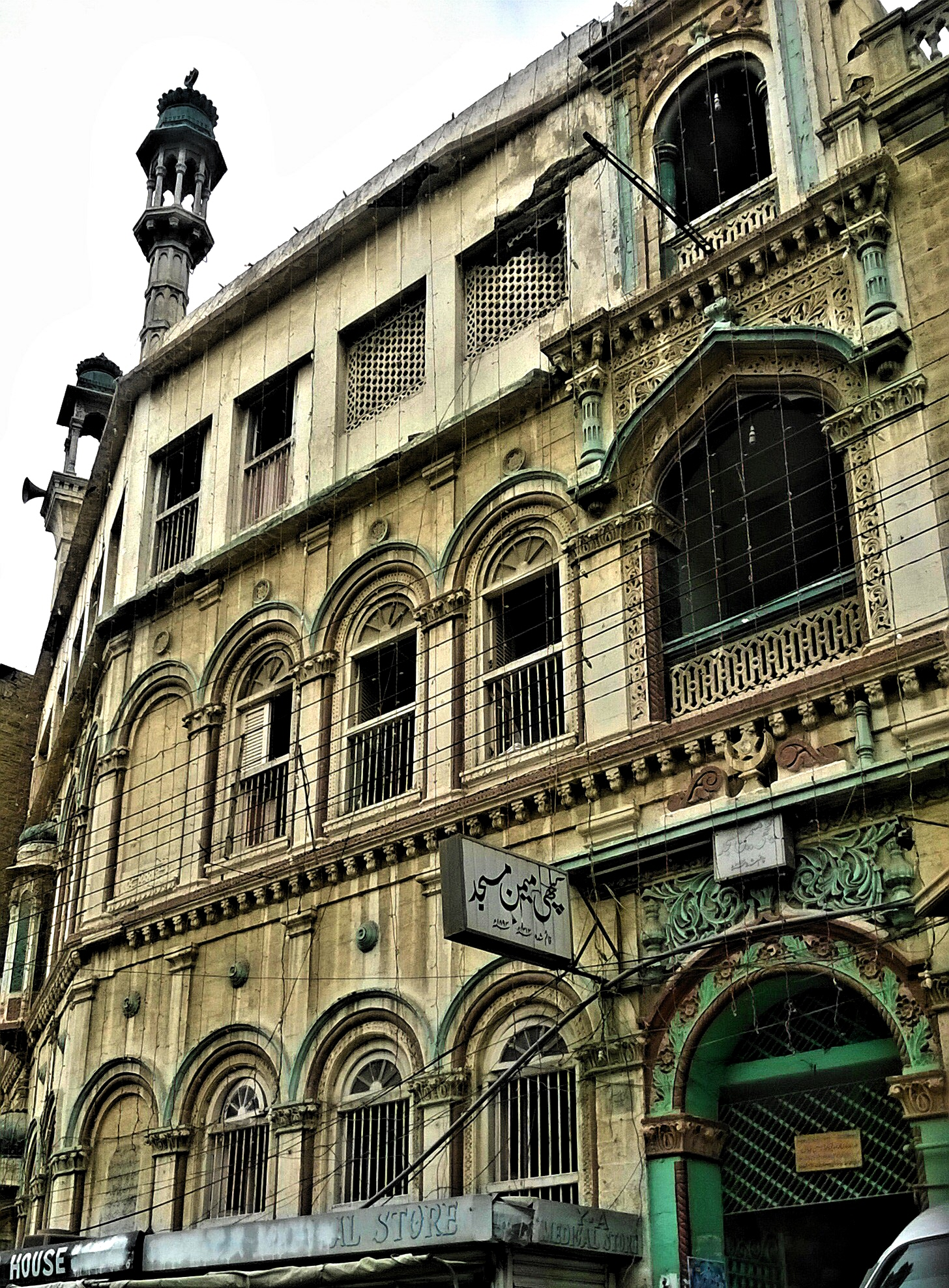
The Kutchi Memon Mosque was built in Saddar, and is a major centre for Memons in the city.

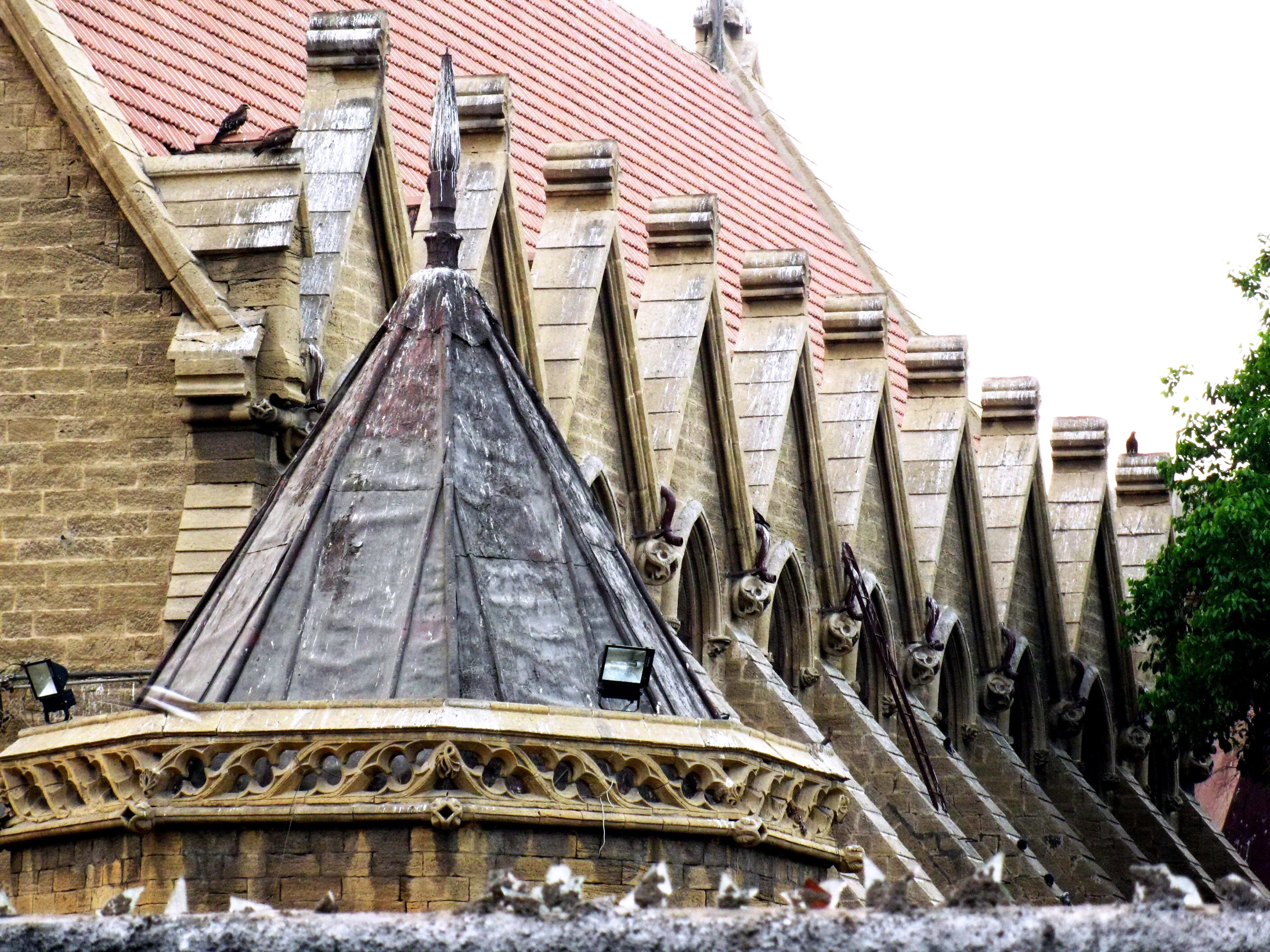
St. Andrew's Church in Saddar was built in 1868.

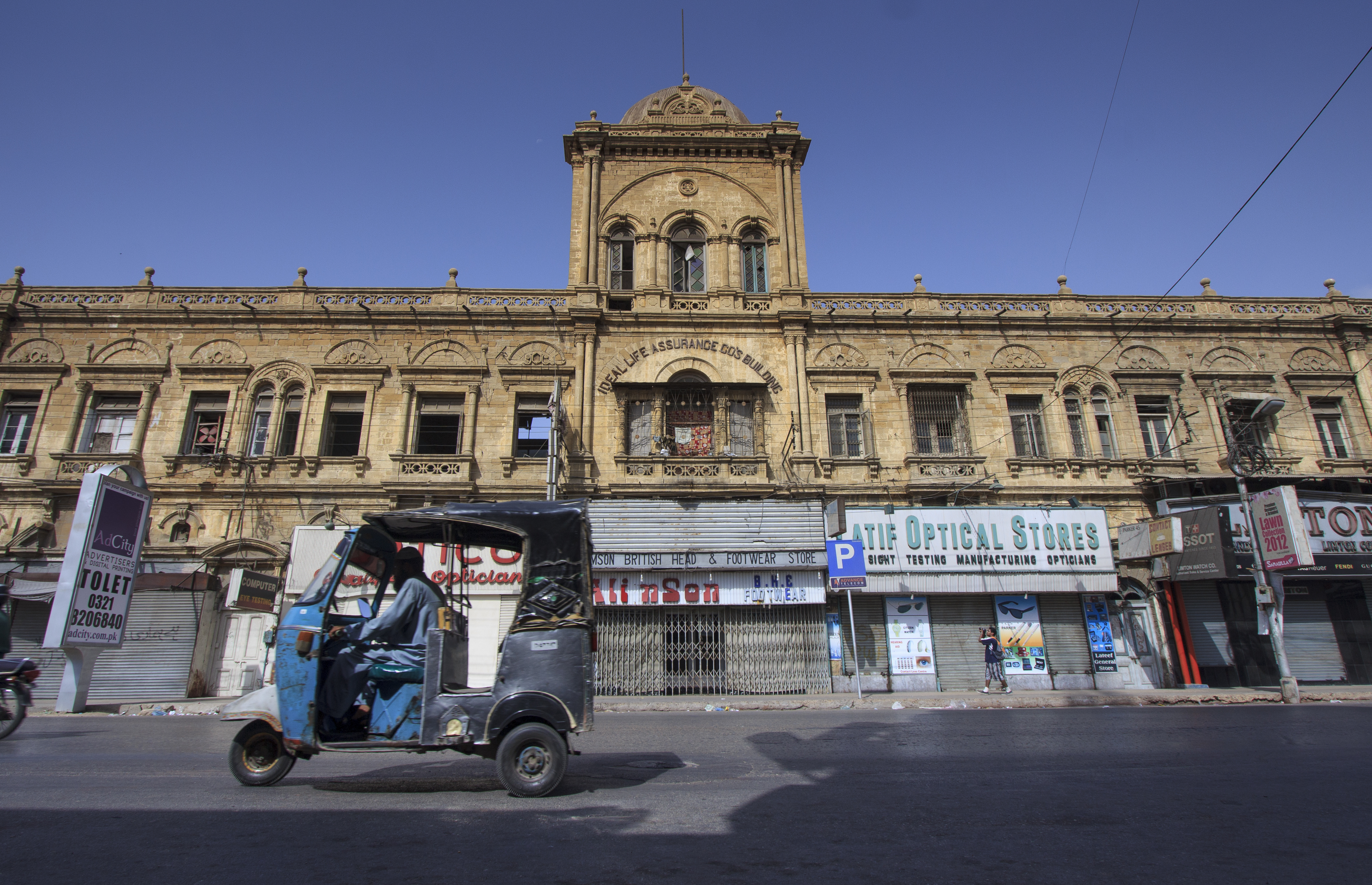
Ilaco House on the corner of Dundass and Zaibunnisa Streets

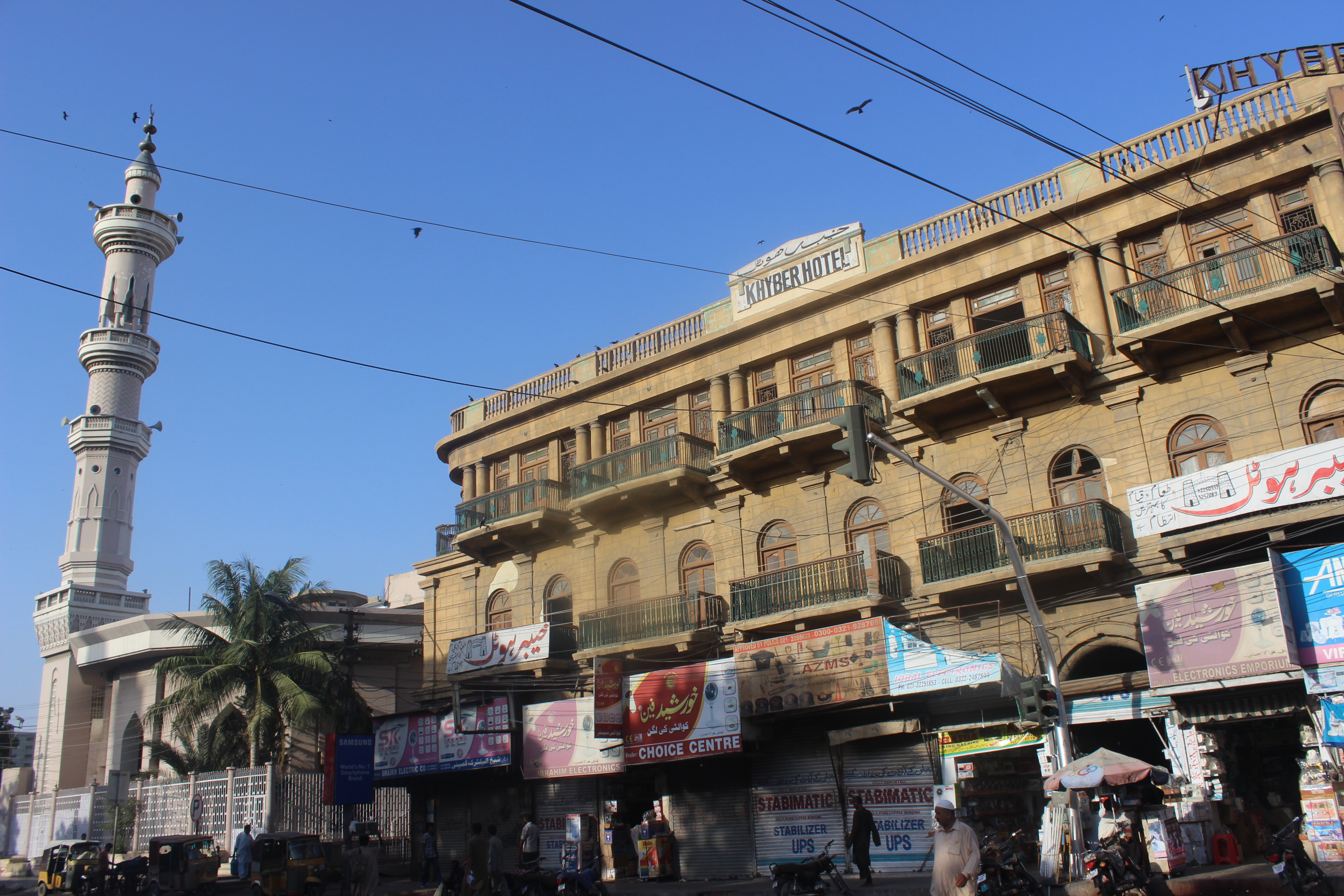
The colonial-era Khyber Hotel

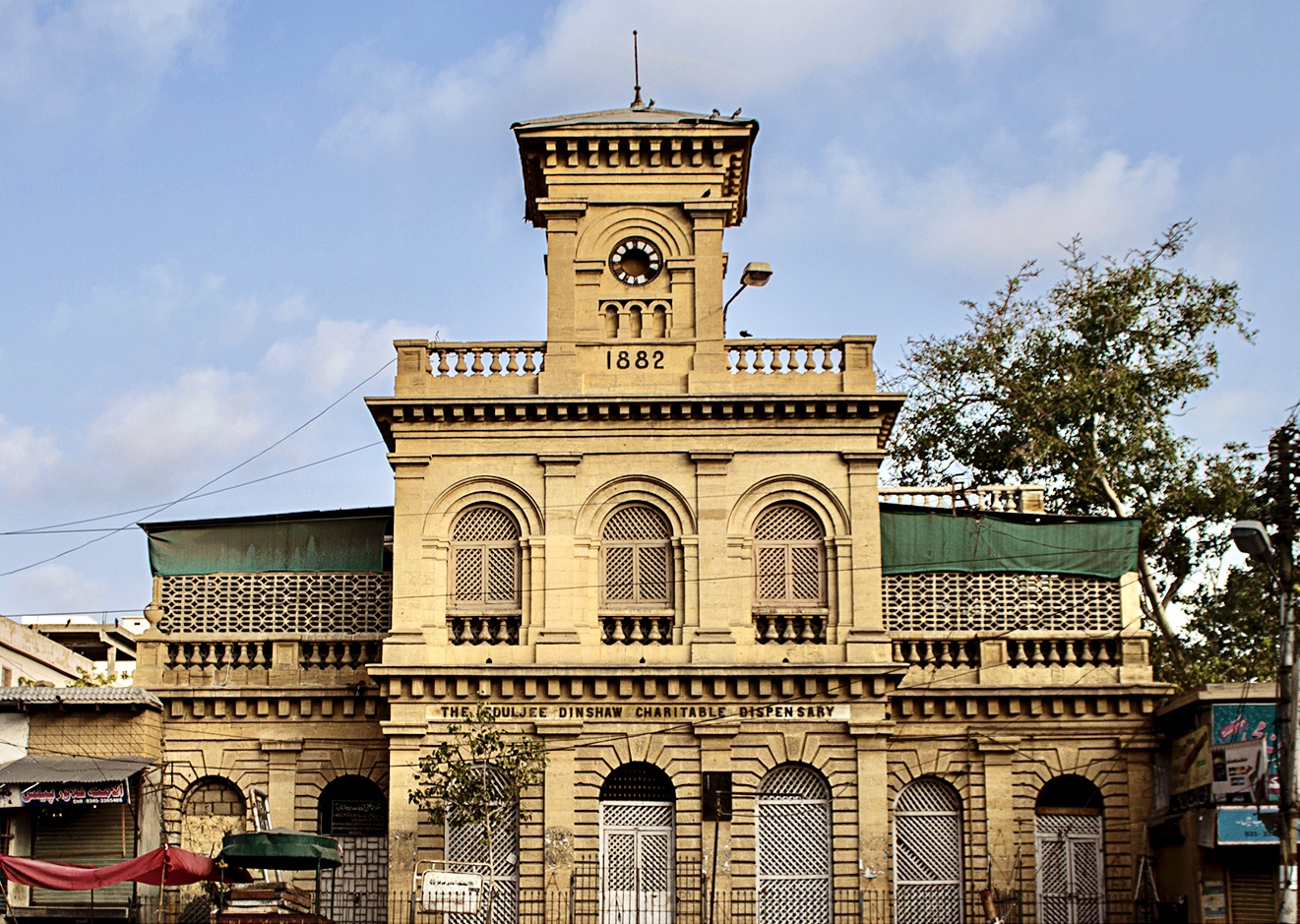
Edulji Dinshaw Dispensary, built in 1882

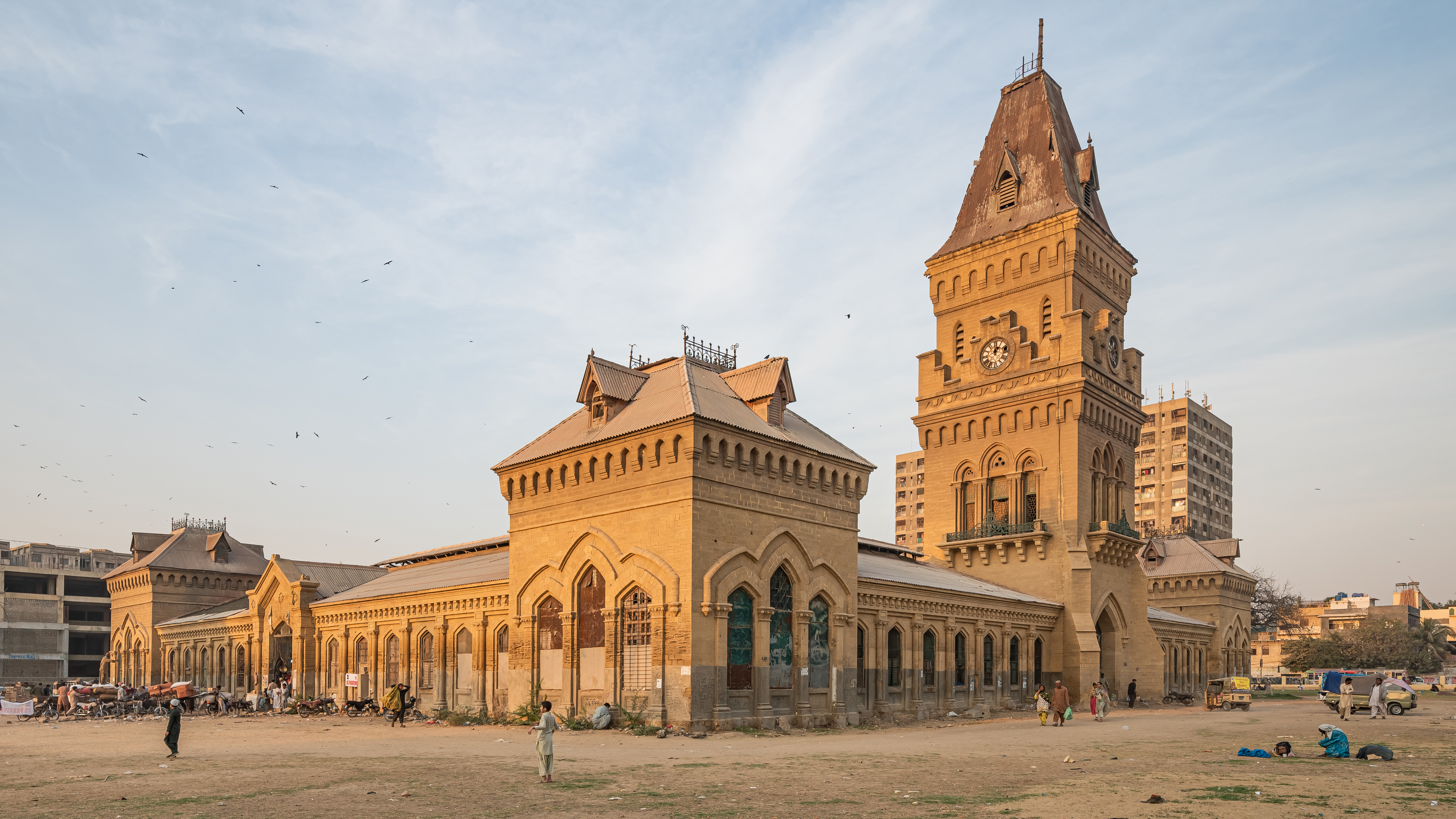
Empress Market, built in 1889

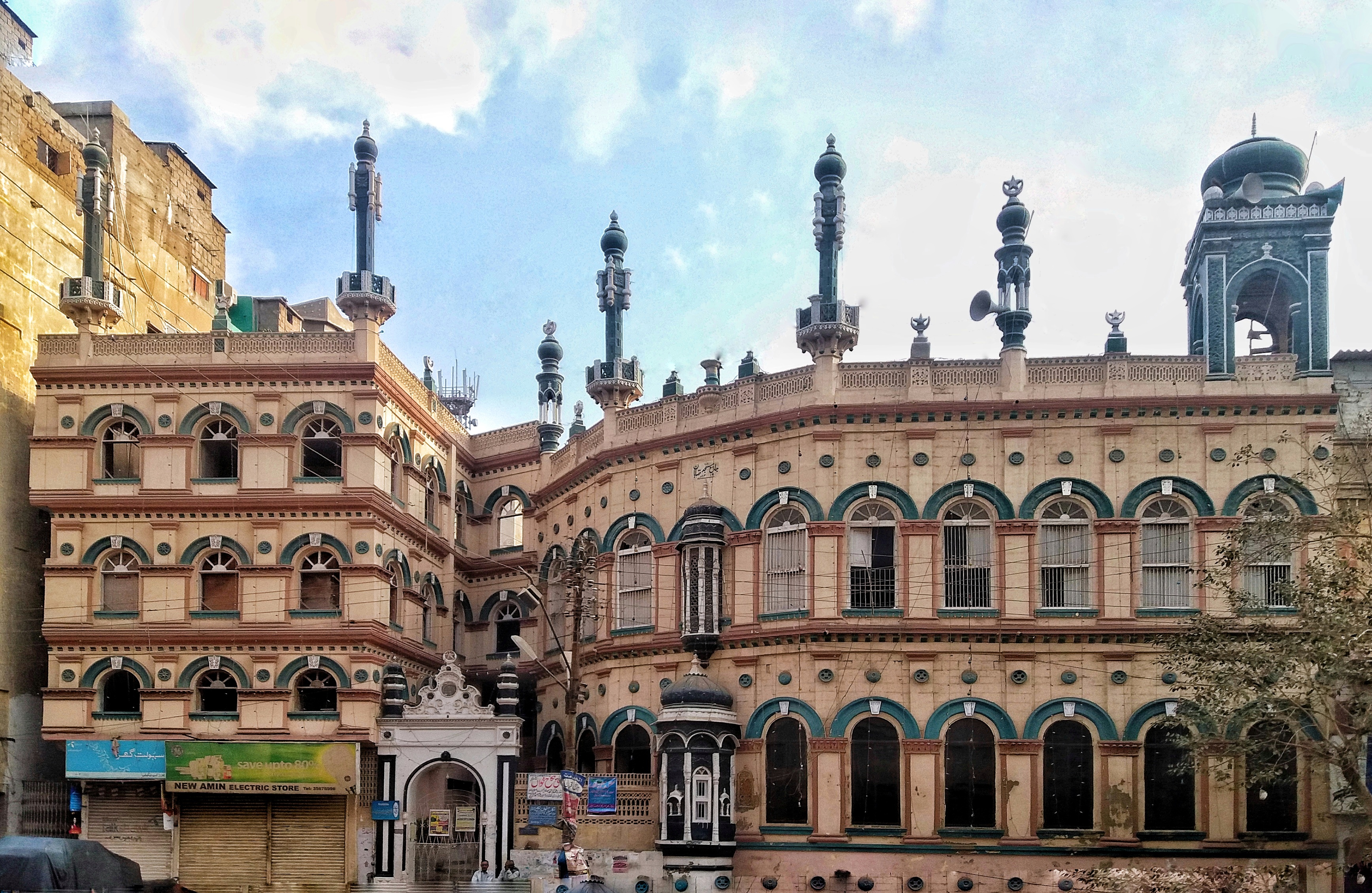
Qasaban Mosque

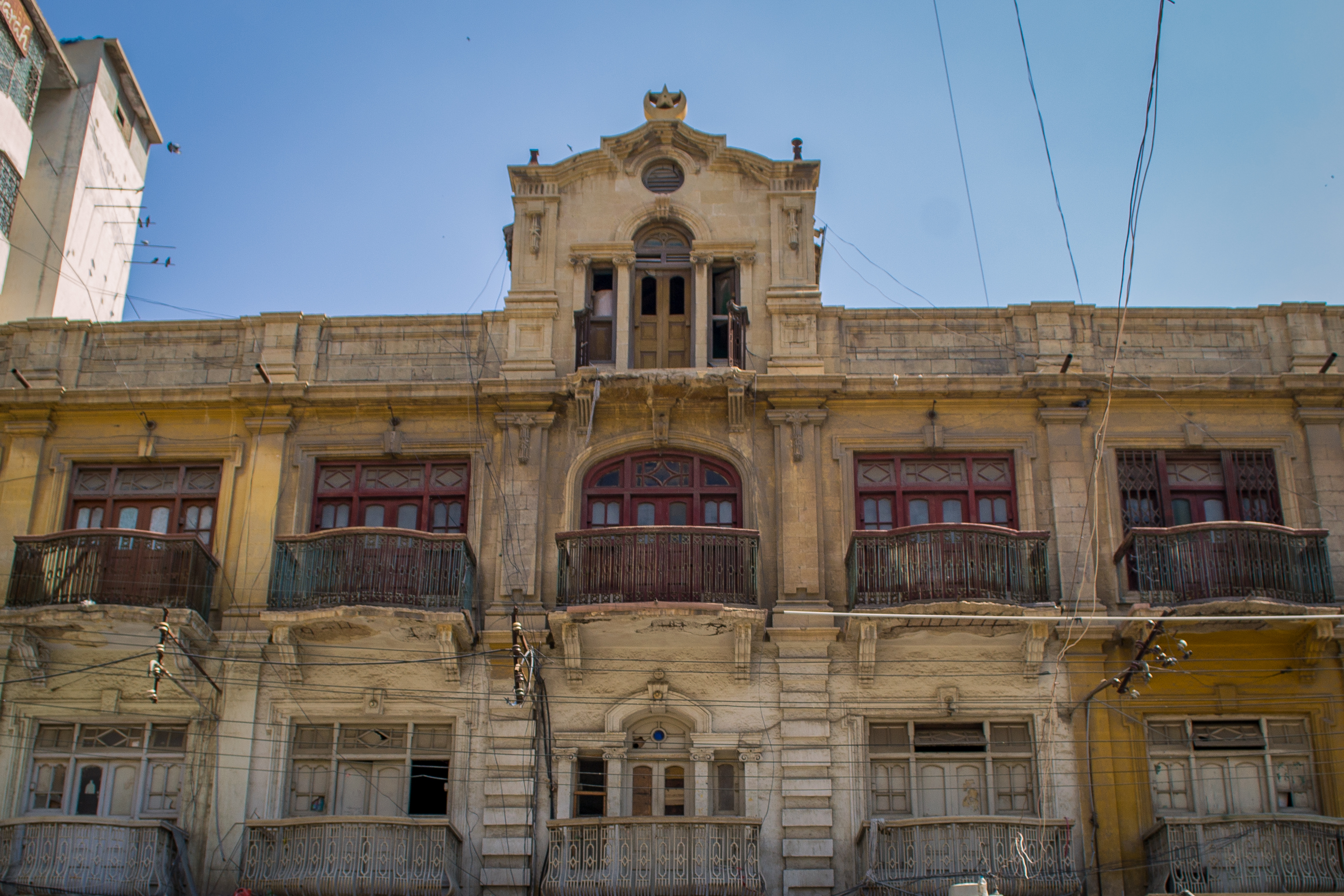
Farid Mansion, on Raja Ghaznafar Ali Street (Somerset Street)

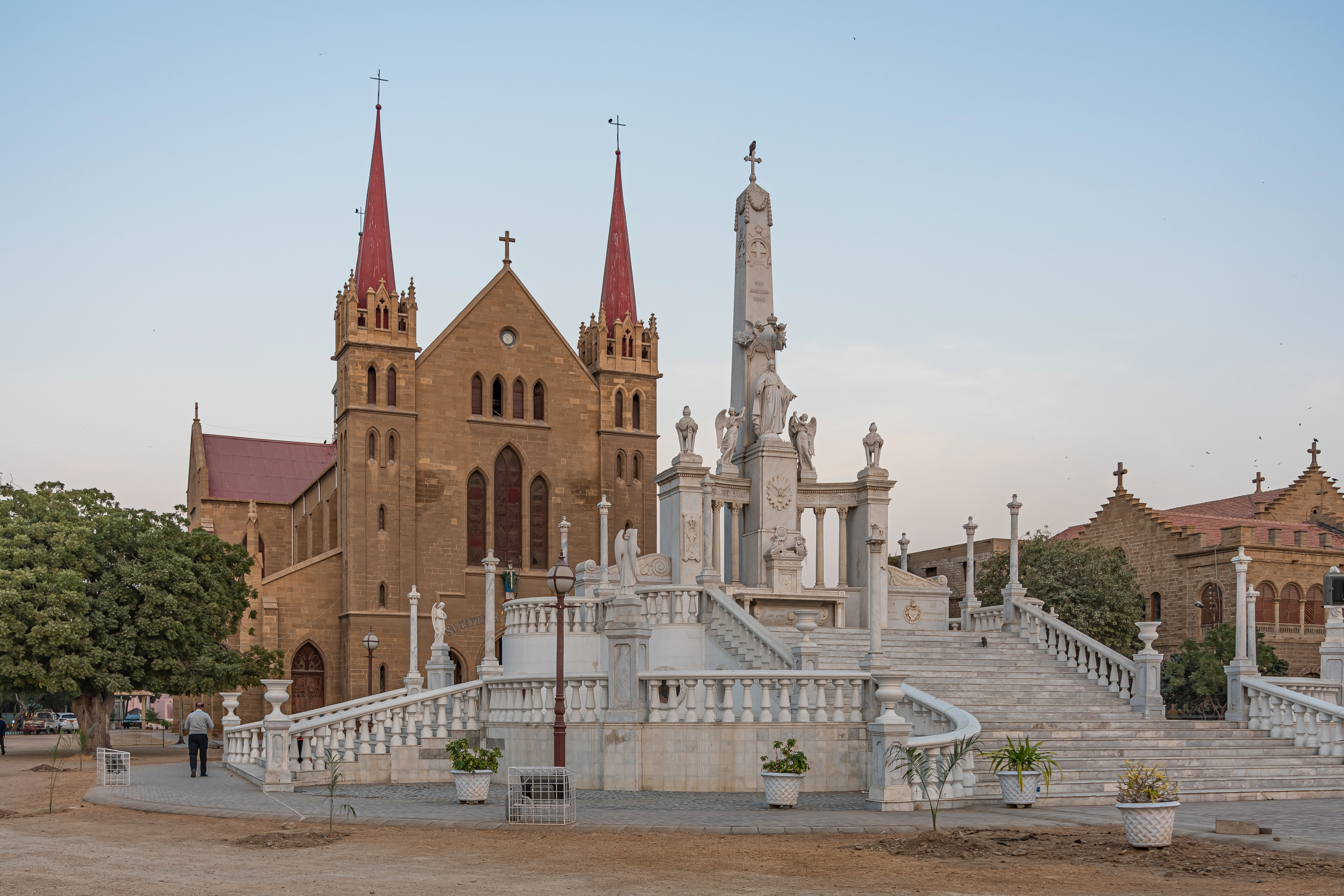
Saddar's St. Patrick's Cathedral is seat of the Roman Catholic Archdiocese of Karachi.
