= Edulji Dinshaw Dispensary =

Edulji Dinshaw Dispensary ایڈُلجی ڈنشا ڈسپنسری
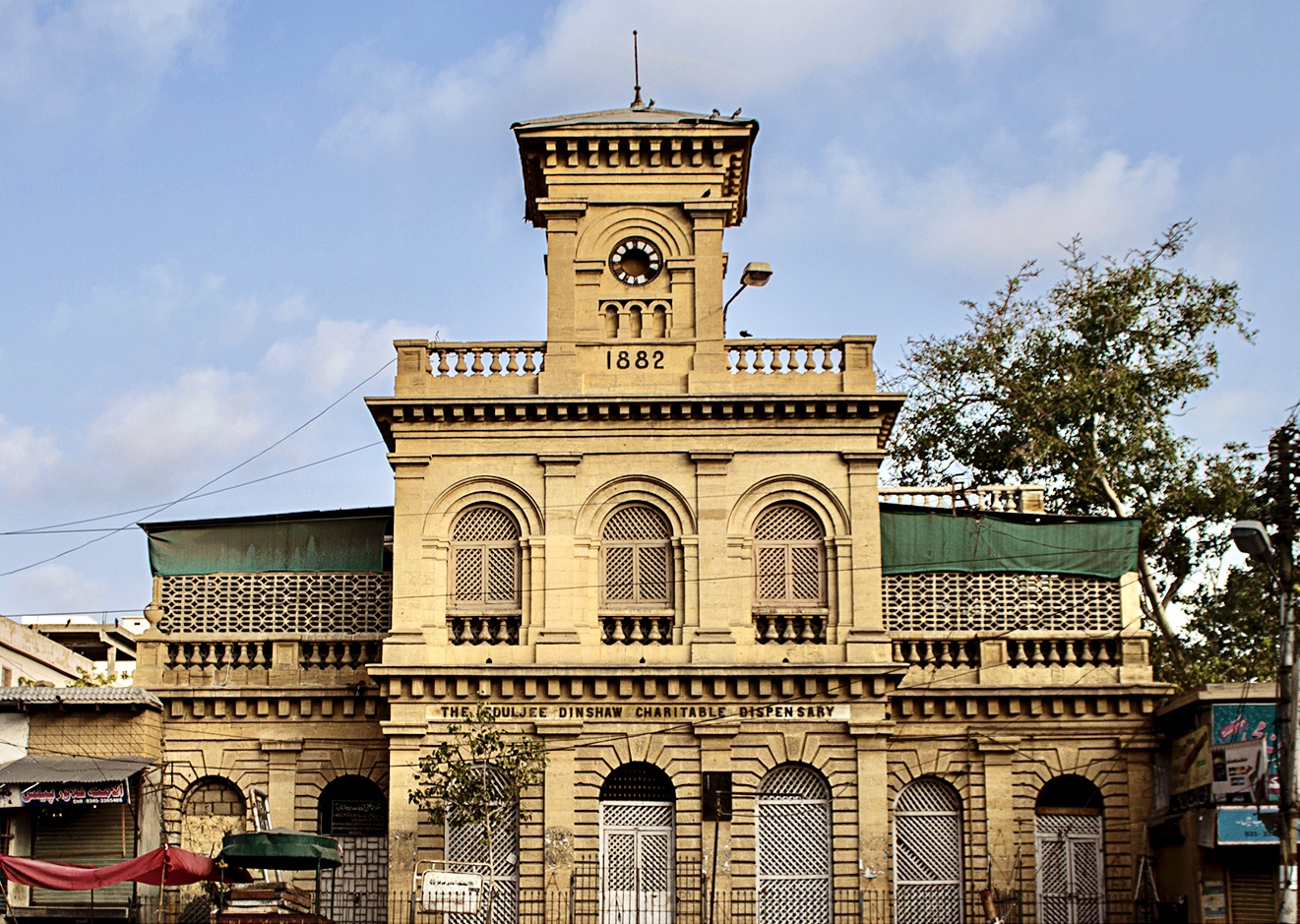

General information
- Architectural style: Italianate
- Location: Saddar, Karachi, Pakistan
- Coordinates: 24°51′40″N 67°01′41″E
- Completed: 1882

Design and construction
- Architect: James Strachan

Edulji Dinshaw Dispensary (Urdu: ایڈُلجی ڈنشا ڈسپنسری), officially the Eduljee Dinshaw Charitable Dispensary, is a building in the Saddar neighborhood of central Karachi, Pakistan.

== History ==
Edulji Dinshaw Dispensary opened in 1882 as a charitable dispensary for Karachi residents. It was named after Karachi-based Parsi philanthropist Seth Edulji Dinshaw, who contributed 5,500 rupees toward the building's construction, accounting for half of the total cost. Dinshaw had risen from poverty to become Karachi's largest landowner at the time. The building was designed by James Strachan, and was Karachi's first Italianate building.

== Gallery ==
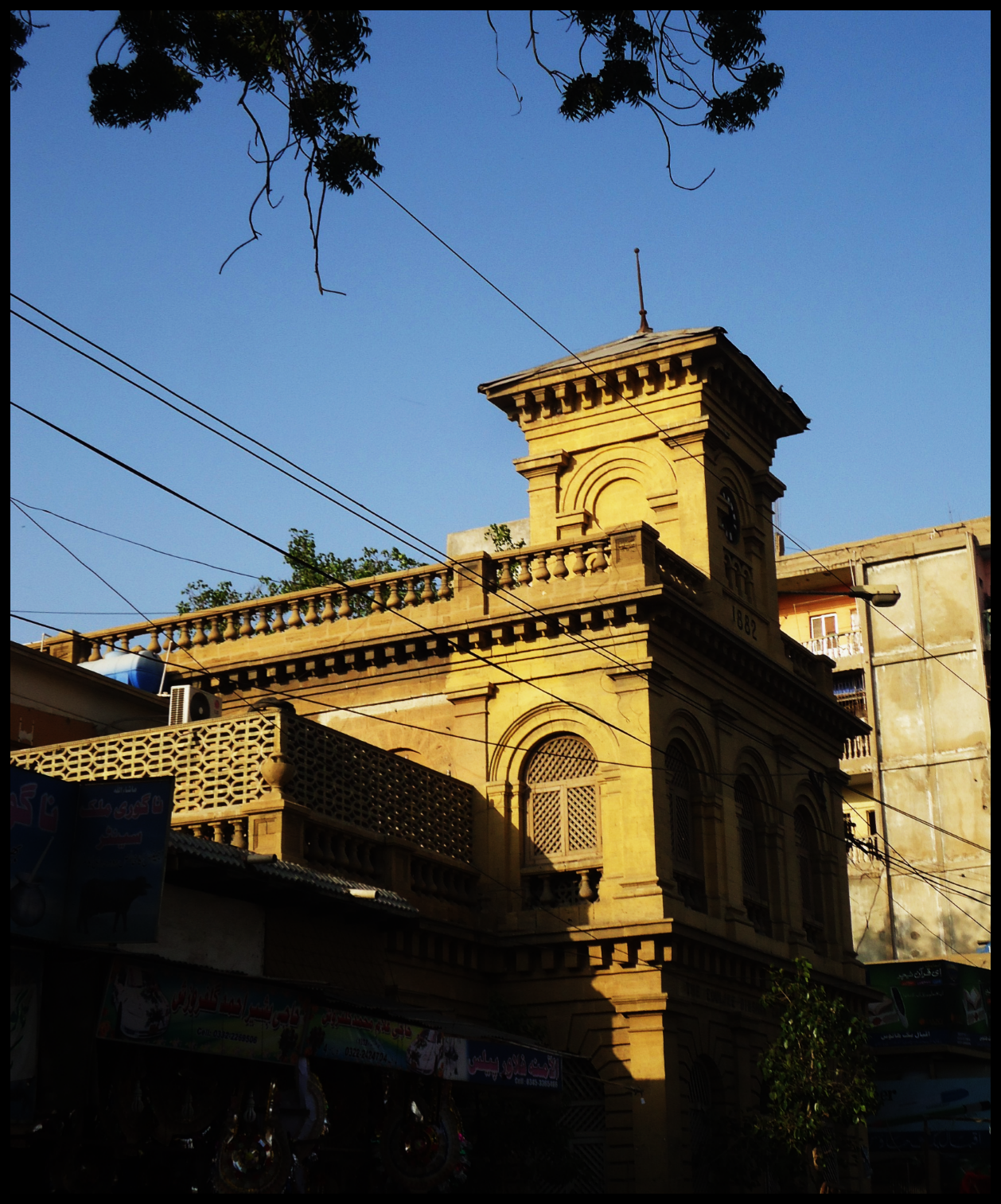

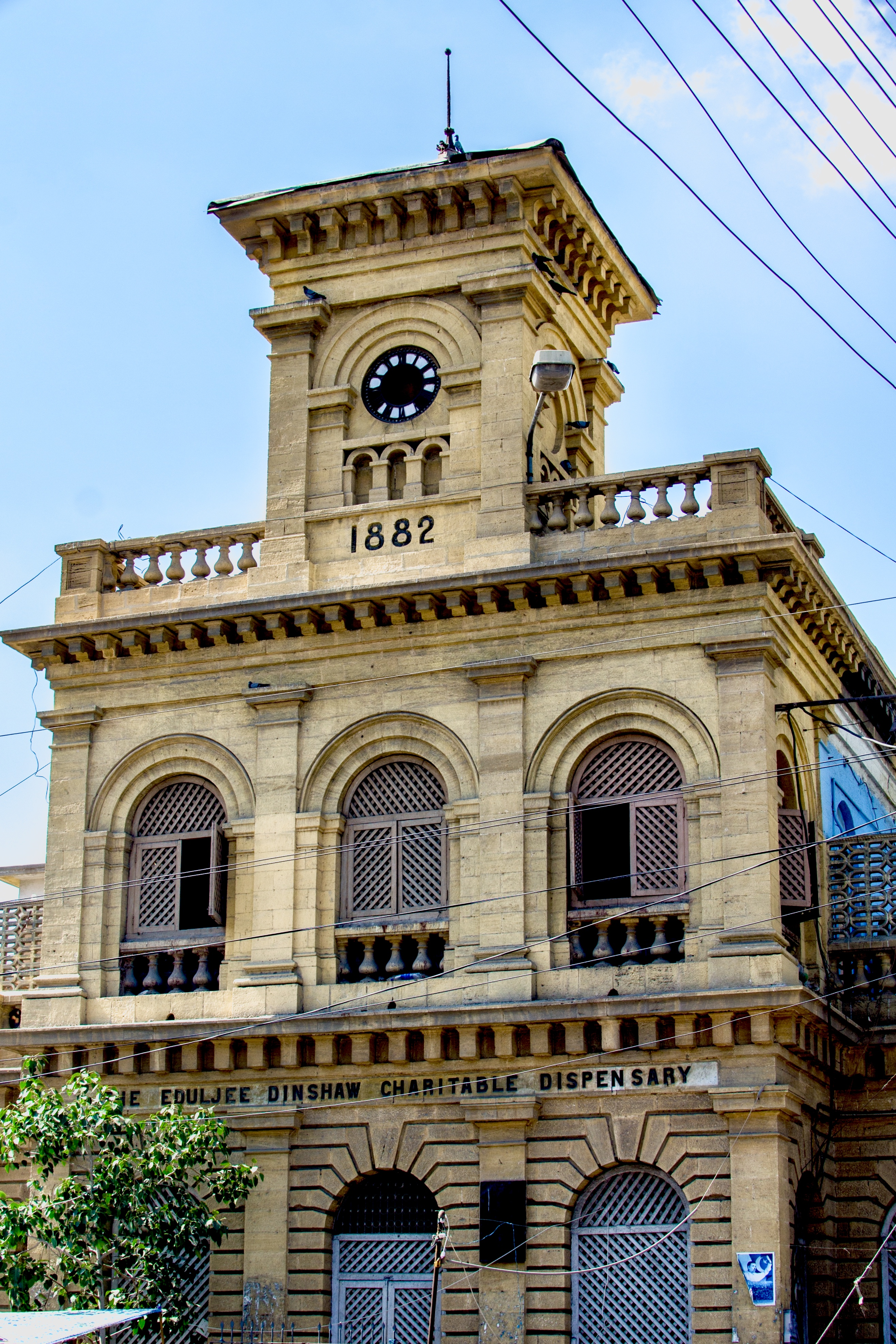

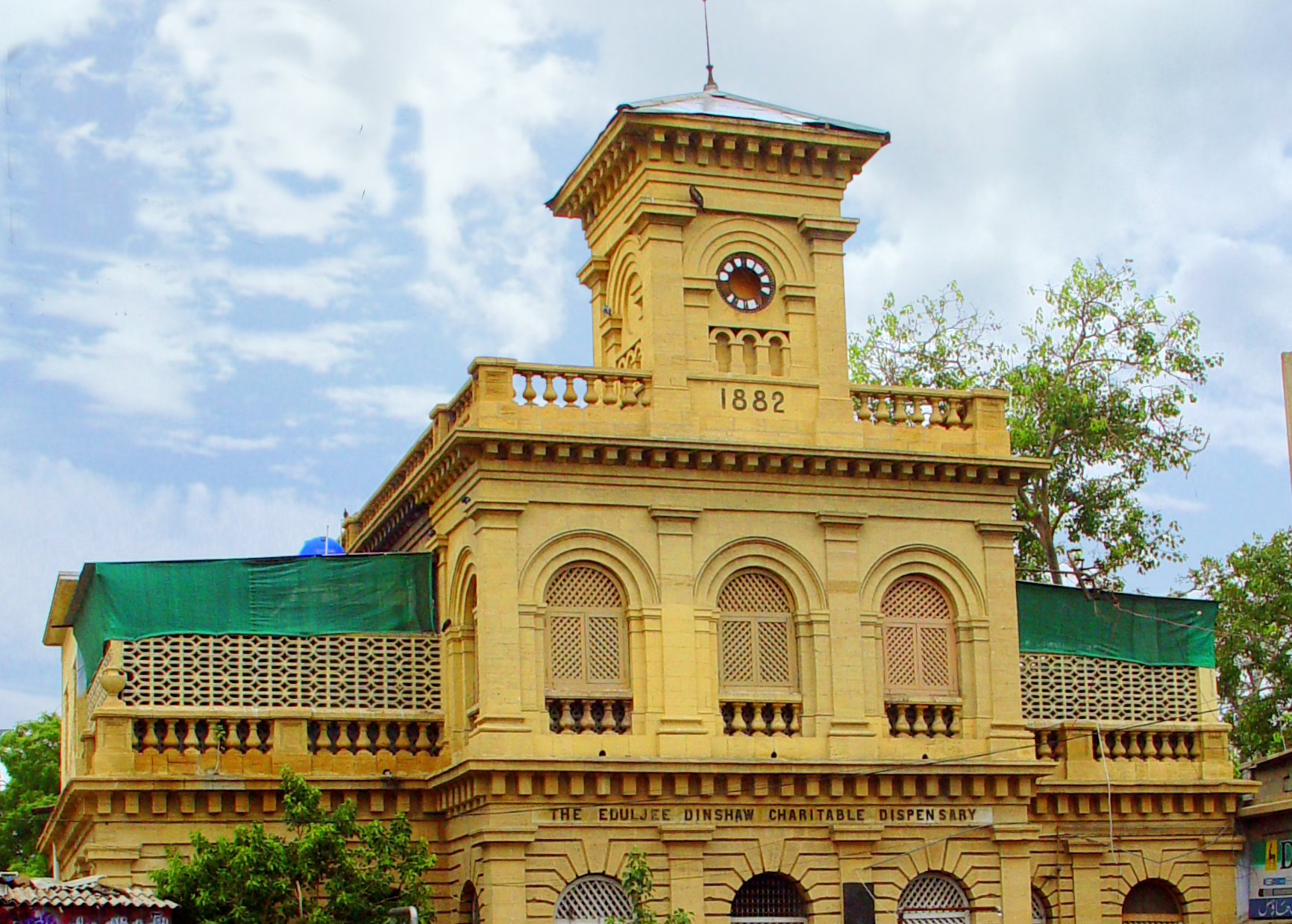

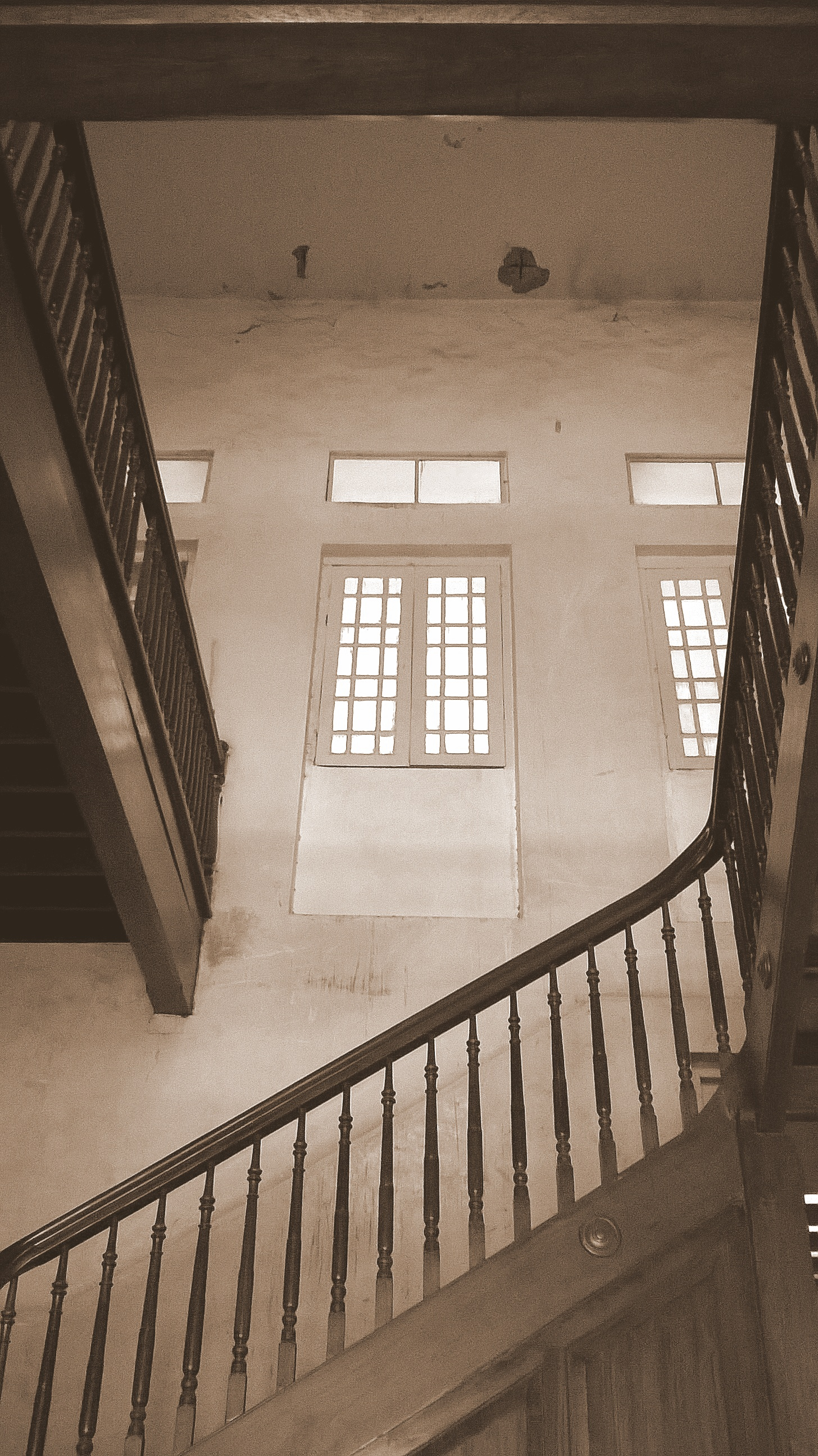

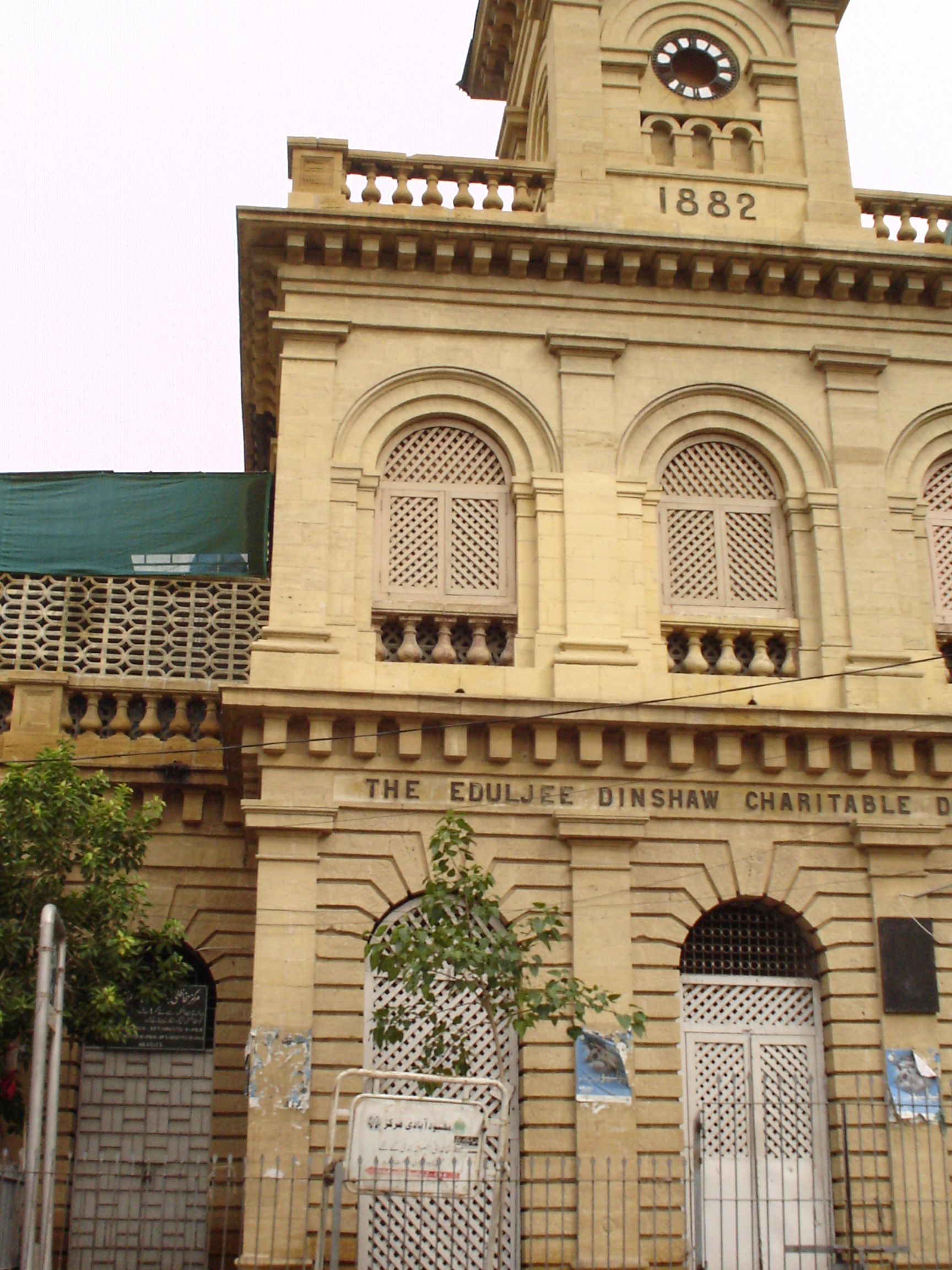
