= Empress Market =

Marketplace in Karachi, Pakistan

Coordinates: 24°51′45″N 67°1′46″E

Empress Market ایمپریس مارکیٹ
- Marketplace
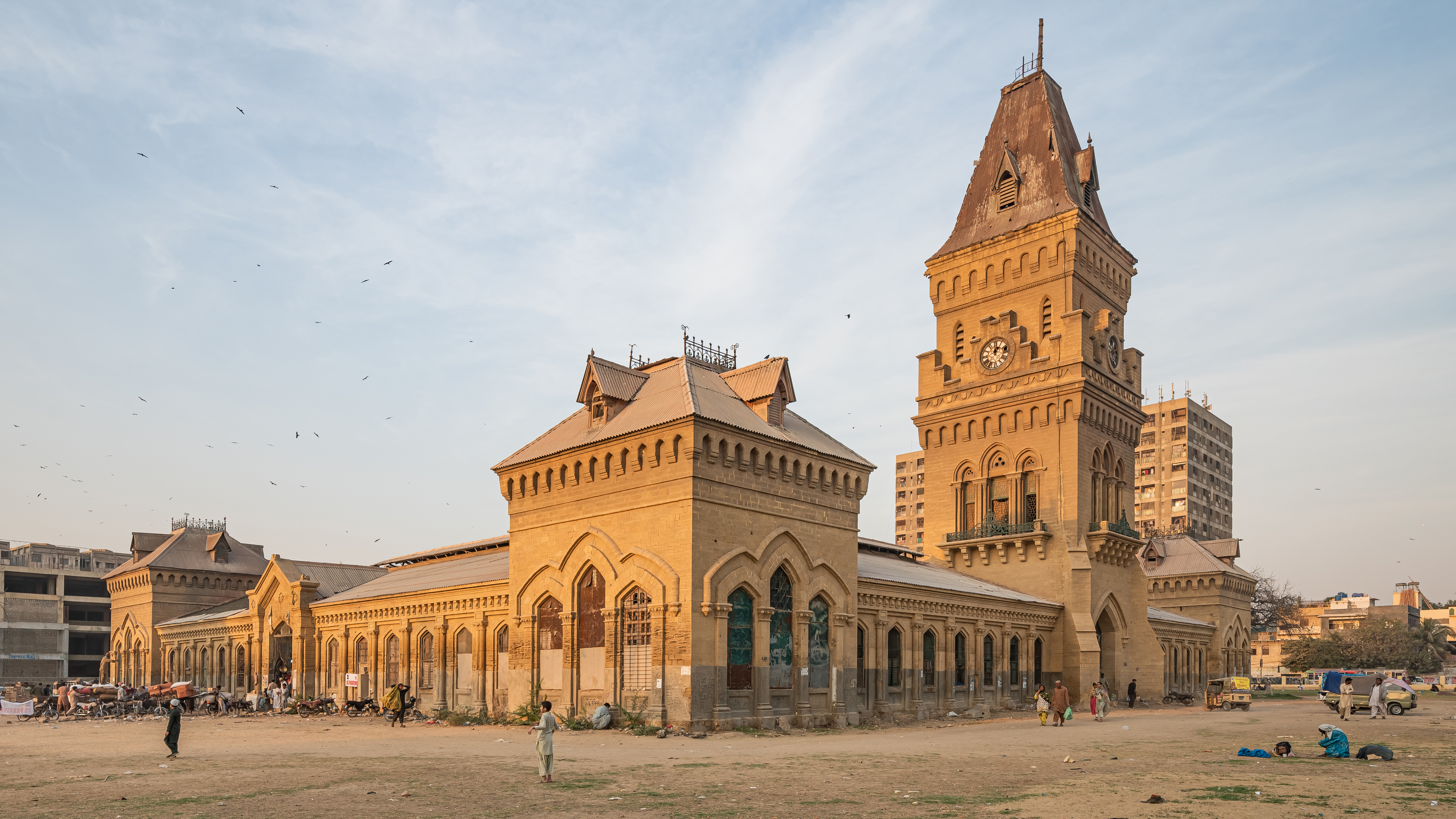
- Karachi's oldest market, Empress Market is located in Saddar Town of Karachi, Pakistan.
- Interactive map of Empress Market ایمپریس مارکیٹ
- Country: Pakistan
- Province: Sindh
- City: Karachi
- Town: Saddar Town

The Empress Market (Urdu: ایمپریس مارکیٹ, Sindhi: ايمپريس مارڪيٽ) is a marketplace situated in the Saddar Town locality of Karachi, Pakistan. The market traces its origins to the British Raj era, when it was first constructed. Today, it is amongst the most popular and busy places for shopping in Karachi. Commodities sold in the Empress Market range from condiments, fruit, vegetables and meat to stationery material, textiles and pets. A recreational park called Jahangir Park also is located nearby.

== History ==
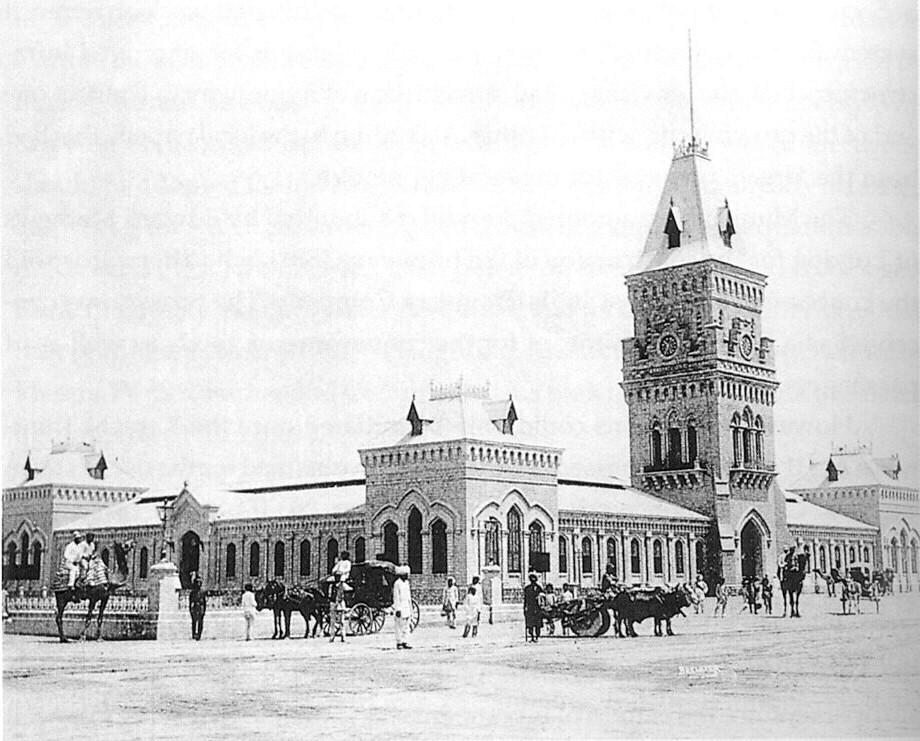
The market in 1890

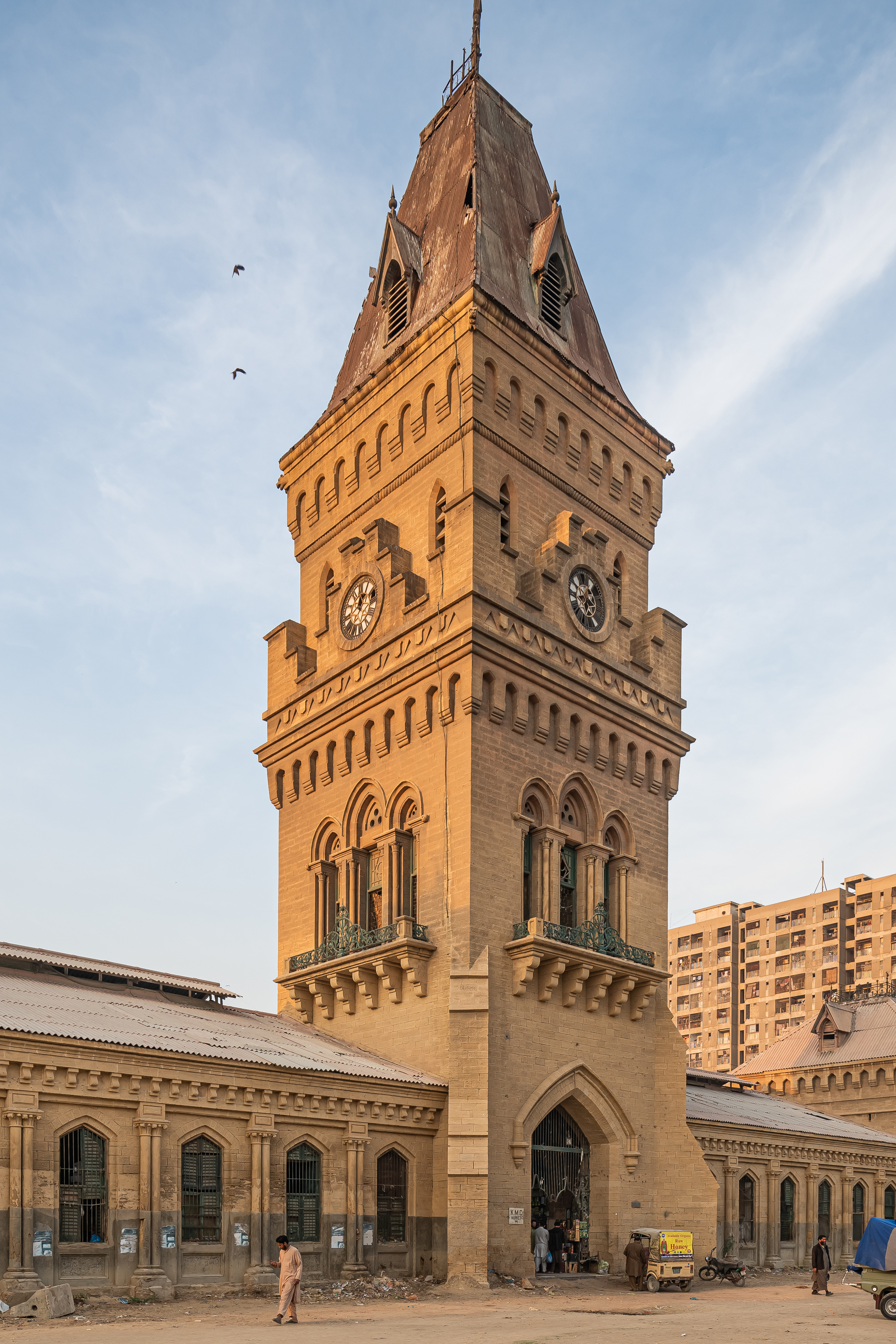
Central tower of the market

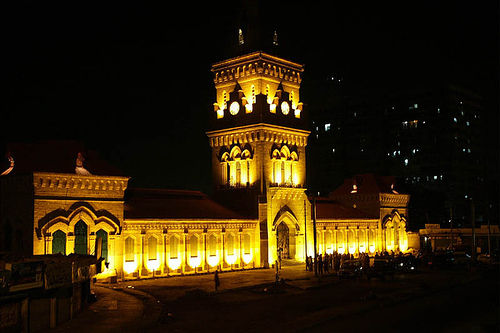
The market at night

The Empress Market was constructed between 1884 and 1889 and was named for Victoria, Empress of India. The market was constructed at a well-chosen site that was clearly visible from a great distance, and prevented the erection of a monument to honour the sepoys executed there after the failed 1857 uprising against British rule.

The foundation stone of the Empress Market was laid by the-then Governor of Bombay, James Fergusson in 1884, who also laid the foundation of the Merewether Memorial Tower. It was designed by James Strachan, the foundations were completed by the English firm of A.J. Attfield, and the building was constructed by the local firm of 'Mahoomed Niwan and Dulloo Khejoo'. The building was arranged around a courtyard, 39.6 m (130 ft) by 30.4 m (100 ft) with four galleries each 14 m (46 ft) wide. The galleries provided accommodation for 280 shops and stall keepers; at the time of its construction it was one of only seven markets in Karachi.

Empress Market is a grand structure in the Indo-Gothic style having vaulted roofs, cusped arches, a 42.6 m (140 ft) clock tower studded with leopard heads.

In 2017, according to the reports in the news media, Karachi citizens' hopes for seeing a badly needed renovation and repair job on this British Raj building were fading away. The previous Governor of Sindh also had ordered the building's renovation when he was in office, but they never materialized.

Originally, Empress Market had 280 shops and stalls inside the building. In the year 1954, the KMC increased the number to 405 shops and stalls and also built an additional 1,390 shops and cabins on outside the building.

== Illegal Sales ==
Empress market is one of the places in Karachi where exotic and endangered species like Macaw, Falcons and other birds are sold without any approved license. On 24 August 2015, up to 50 protected birds and a pair of monkey were brought to sell in Empress, when a raid by wildlife department caught the people who brought the animals. The confiscated birds consisted of 20 Chukar partridge, 18 wild doves, eight black partridges, four grey partridges and two flamingoes.

== Encroachment Removals ==
Following a Supreme Court order, a major operation was launched in November 2018 to remove more than 1,000 shops constructed informally on land encroached around the market and destroyed around 4,000 livelihoods. The resulting clean up restored the visual grandeur of the market although social commentators objected to the destruction of a large number of small businesses some of which had been in existence for more than 50 years.

At present, some small stands and shops can be seen right outside the premises.

== See also ==
- Rainbow Centre, Karachi, the largest CD and DVD market in Asia, situated adjacent to the Empress Market.
