= James Strachan (engineer) =

Scottish civil engineer in Karachi (died 1917)

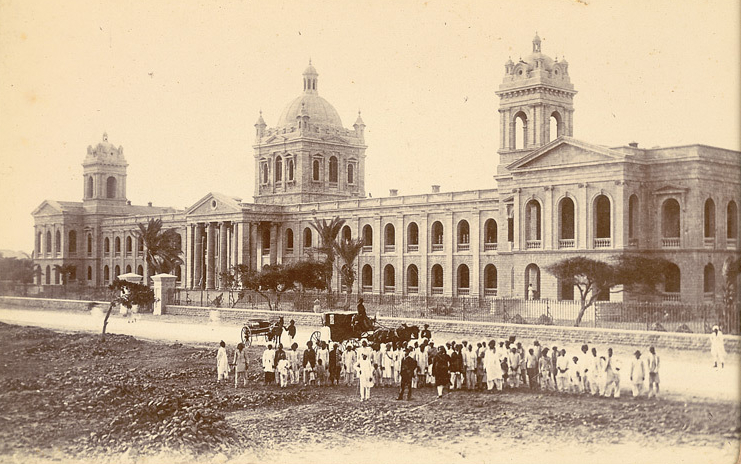
The D. J. Sind College (founded as the Sind Arts College), Karachi, c. 1893, designed by Strachan

James Strachan CIE M.Inst.C.E. (died 7 February 1917) was a Scottish civil engineer who served for about 25 years as Engineer and Secretary to the Karachi Municipality, from 1873. He built the city's first piped water supply and its drainage system, and designed several of its best-known Victorian buildings, including Empress Market, the Merewether Clock Tower and Denso Hall.

== Early life ==
Strachan was the eldest son of James Strachan, a bookseller in Aberdeen, and was educated in the city. He was apprenticed as a civil engineer to Mr Smith, the Aberdeen city architect. He then worked on the construction of the Smyrna and Cassaba Railway in the Ottoman Empire before going to India, where he was a divisional engineer on the Great Indian Peninsula Railway and the Bombay, Baroda and Central India Railway.

== Karachi Municipality ==
In 1873 Strachan was appointed Engineer and Secretary to the Karachi Municipality, a post he held for about a quarter of a century.

=== Water supply ===
Strachan prepared Karachi's first practicable water-supply scheme. He revived an earlier scheme for bringing water to Karachi from the Malir River, replacing its cast-iron pipes with an underground masonry conduit to cut the cost. The foundation stone of the distributing reservoir was laid by the Governor of Bombay, Sir Richard Temple, on 18 February 1880. Water was drawn from two large wells on the Malir about 16 miles from the town, and the works opened on 21 April 1883 at a cost of Rs 854,973. Strachan then pressed for the supply to be extended into the older parts of the town, which was done in 1884. He described the scheme in a paper to the Institution of Civil Engineers. At the opening the Municipal Commissioners voted Strachan a bonus of £500 with their thanks.

=== Other municipal works ===
Strachan began kerosene street lighting in 1883 and originated the scheme for the Karachi tramway. With H. M. Birdwood and Mr Ffinch of the Indo-European Telegraph, he helped to form the collection of animals at the Karachi municipal gardens, the origin of the Karachi Zoo. He later designed a drainage system using Shone pneumatic ejectors, opened by the Governor of Bombay, Lord Harris, in December 1894 and completed in 1895.

=== Buildings ===
As municipal engineer Strachan designed many of Karachi's public buildings. The 1919 district gazetteer described the Merewether Clock Tower as "a memorial also of Mr. J. Strachan, the Municipal Engineer who designed it and many other public buildings in Karachi". His works include:

- Edulji Dinshaw Dispensary (1882)
- Denso Hall (c. 1885)
- Empress Market, in the "Domestic Gothic" style (1884–1889)
- Merewether Clock Tower (1884–1892)
- The building of the Sind Arts College, later renamed the D. J. Sind College after its benefactor Dayaram Jethmal and now the D. J. Sindh Government Science College; the foundation stone was laid by the Viceroy, Lord Dufferin, in November 1887 and the building was occupied in 1892
- Victoria Museum, whose foundation stone was laid by the Duke of Connaught; for lack of funds it was later built as a wing of the college
- Boulton Market, Bunder Road, extended in 1886–87
- Bank of Bombay, McLeod Road, with an Ionic front (1888)
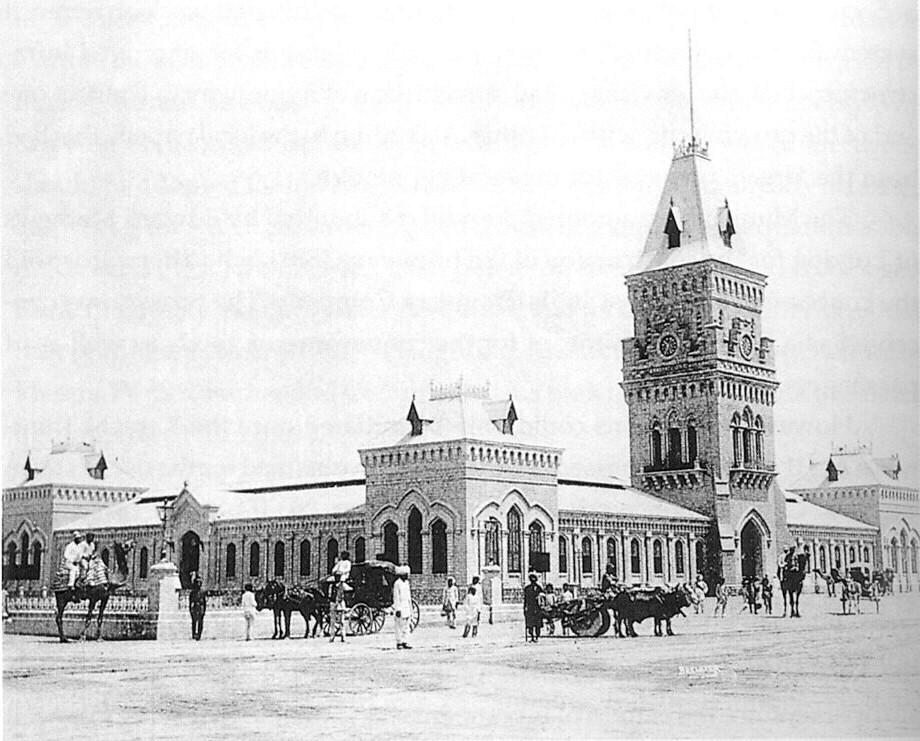
Empress Market in 1890

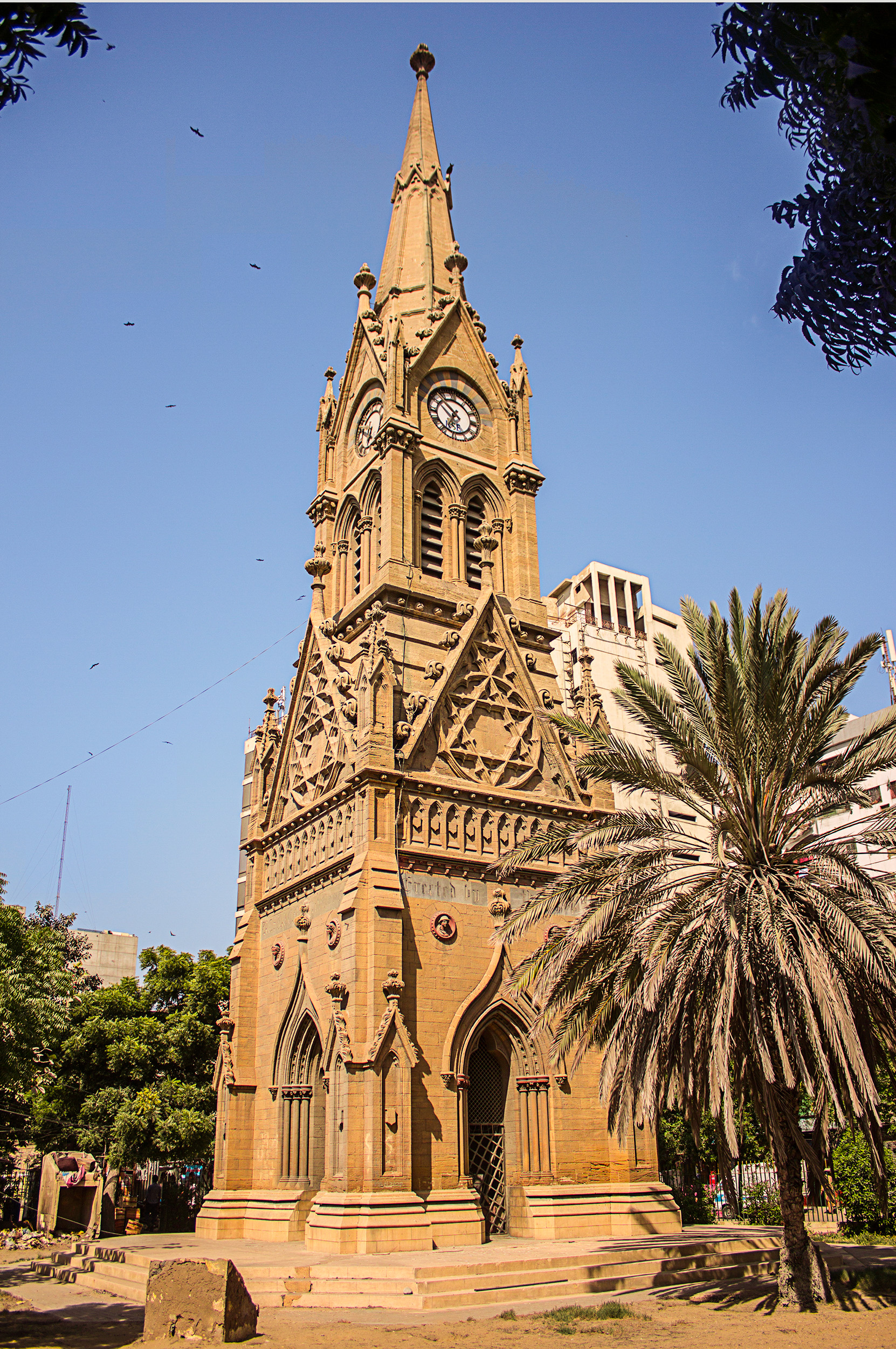
Merewether Clock Tower

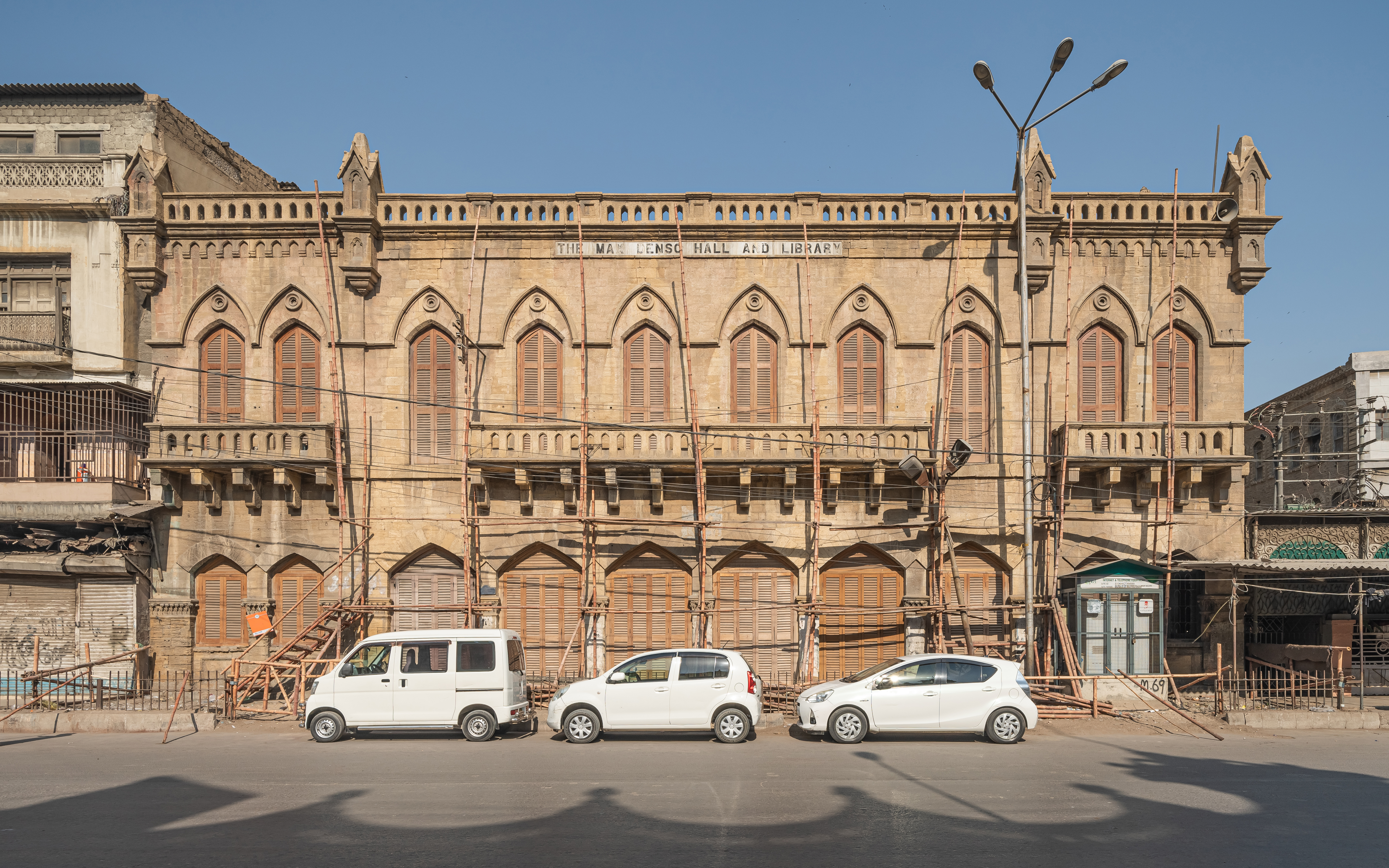
Denso Hall

== Honours ==
Strachan Road, Karachi, named after him

Strachan was appointed a Companion of the Order of the Indian Empire (CIE) in the 1897 Diamond Jubilee Honours, as Engineer and Secretary to the Karachi Municipality. A road in Karachi was named after him.

== Personal life and death ==
Strachan's daughter was born at Bath in March 1876, and an infant son, Arthur George, died at Karachi on 17 April 1883. On retiring he settled at Sydenham, where he died at his home, 47 Kirkdale, on 7 February 1917. He was survived by his widow and family, and was buried at Elmers End Cemetery, Beckenham.
