= Speaking in Tongues (disambiguation) =

Speaking in tongues is the phenomenon of speaking in unintelligible utterances, often as part of religious practices.

Speaking in Tongues may also refer to:

== Music ==
- Speaking in Tongues (Talking Heads album), 1983
- Speaking in Tongues (David Murray album), 1999
- Speaking in Tongues, a 2001 album by The Holmes Brothers
- Speaking in Tongues (Bizzy Bone album), 2005
- "Speaking in Tongues" (Hilltop Hoods song), 2011
- "Speaking in Tongues" (Arcade Fire song), 2011
- "Speaking in Tongues", a song by Meat Loaf from the 2016 album Braver Than We Are

== Other uses ==
- Angelic tongues, sung praise in Second Temple period Jewish materials
- Speaking in Tongues (speech), a 1979 speech by Gloria E. Anzaldúa
- Speaking in Tongues, a 1996 play by Andrew Bovell
- Speaking in Tongues (TV series), an Australian television series
- Speaking in Tongues (2009 film), an American documentary film
- Speaking in Tongues (2018 film), American drama film

== See also ==
- Speak in Tongues, a music venue in Cleveland, Ohio
- "Speak in Tongues", a song by Placebo from the 2009 album Battle for the Sun
