= Yisroel Bernath =

American rabbi, actor, podcaster

- Born: Skokie, Illinois, U.S.
- Occupations: Rabbi, actor, screenwriter, podcaster
- Organization: Chabad-Lubavitch
- Spouse: Sara Dorfman (m. 2005)
- Children: 5
- Website: theloverabbi.com

Yisroel Bernath is an American Hassidic rabbi, actor, screenwriter and podcaster active in Canada. Bernath is spiritual director at Chabad of NDG and the Jewish Chaplain at Concordia University in Montreal, Quebec, Canada. Coined by the Montreal Gazette as the "Love Rabbi" and the "Hipster Rabbi" by Viceland, he is a well-known matchmaker and relationship coach. He is the subject of the CBC Documentaries Kosher Love and its sequel, Meet, Pray, Love: Return of the Love Rabbi.

== Education ==
Bernath received his BA and Rabbinical Ordination from the Central Yeshivas Tomchei Temimim in Brooklyn, New York, and his MA in Hebrew Letters from the Yeshiva Gedolah Rabbinical College of Greater Miami. He also has a diploma from Haddasah-Wiso-Canada Research Center for training in Structural Cognitive Modifiability.

== Matchmaking ==
Bernath is the founder of JMontreal.com, a Montreal-based Jewish dating service which later led to the creation of JMatchmaking International. His work had led to over 100 matches.

Bernath wrote on love and relationships in his column titled "Dear Rabby" which ran monthly in the Canadian Jewish News from August 2017 until April 2020. Bernath continues to share his thoughts on relationships on his podcast, The Love Rabbi.

== Film and television ==
Bernath was the main character in the hit CBC Documentary Kosher Love, which aired July 23, 2017. The documentary was nominated for a Canadian Screen Award and produced and directed by Academy Award winners Frederic Bohbot and Evan Beloff. In September 2022, Bernath was the focus of a second CBC documentary, a sequel to Kosher Love, titled Meet, Pray, Love: Return of the Love Rabbi.

In 2016, Bernath appeared on an episode of Dead Set on Life with Matty Matheson where Bernath, shows Matty around Montreal's kosher food community.

He starred in the documentaries Shekinah: The Intimate Life of Hasidic Women in 2013 and Shekinah Rising in 2018.

Bernath co-wrote full feature animation Young Abraham, which was released in April 2011. As an actor, he performed in The Will: Family Secrets Revealed (2010) and Mixed Blessings (2012).

Bernath has also appeared on CTV News, Breakfast Television, Global News and Your Morning.
