= First to Stand: The Cases and Causes of Irwin Cotler =

Documentary film about Irwin Cotler

First to Stand: the Cases and Causes of Irwin Cotler
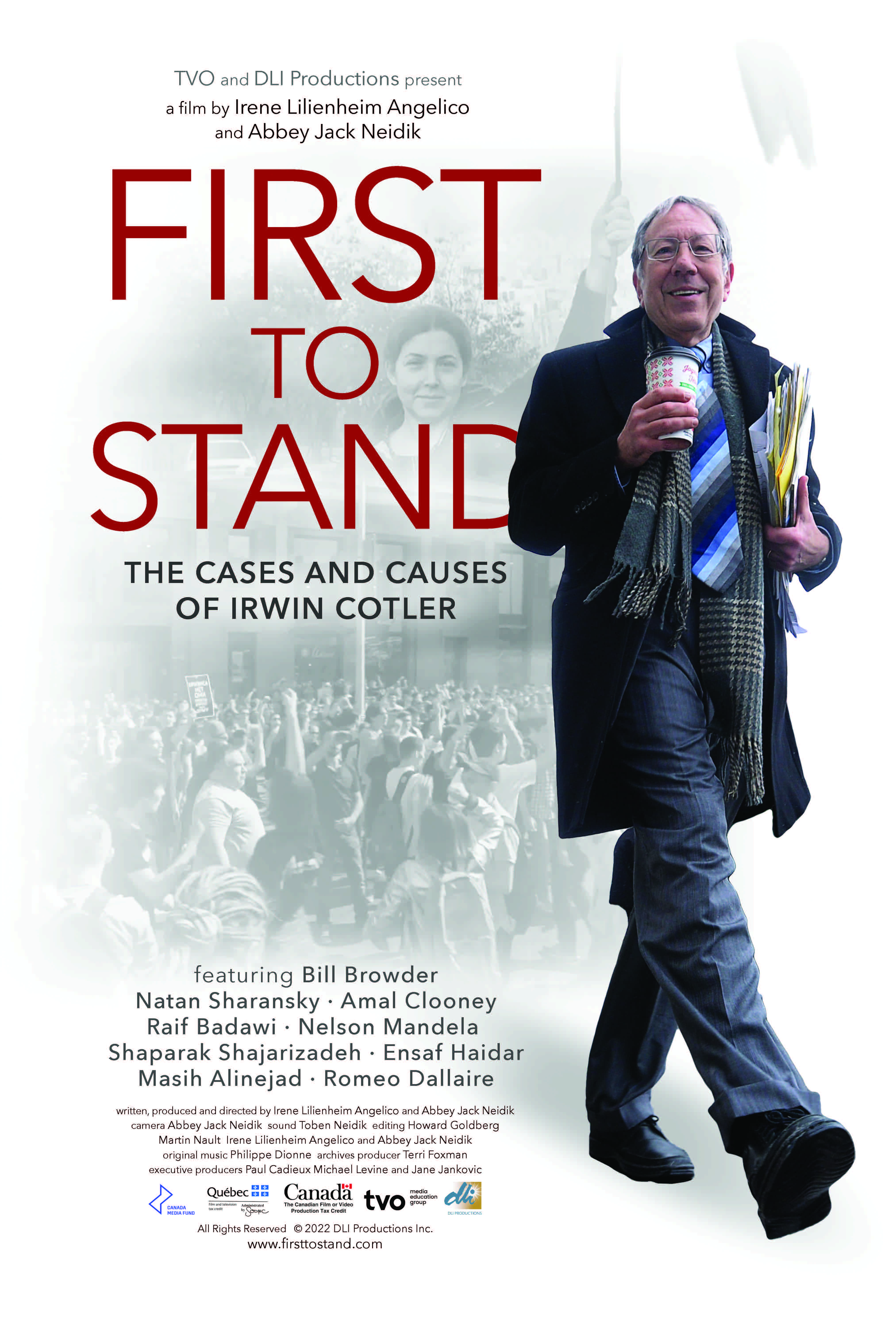
- Directed by: Irene Lilienheim Angelico; Abbey Jack Neidik
- Written by: Irene Lilienheim Angelico; Abbey Jack Neidik
- Produced by: Irene Lilienheim Angelico; Abbey Jack Neidik
- Starring: Irwin Cotler
- Cinematography: Abbey Jack Neidik
- Edited by: Howard Goldberg; Martin Nault; Irene Lilienheim Angelico; Abbey Jack Neidik
- Music by: Philippe Dionne
- Production companies: DLI Productions; TVOntario
- Distributed by: Menemsha Films; Java Films; DLI Productions
- Release date: December 10, 2022
- Running time: 75 minutes
- Country: Canada
- Language: English

First to Stand: the Cases and Cases of Irwin Cotler is a 2022 Canadian documentary film written, directed and produced by Irene Lilienheim Angelico and Abbey Jack Neidik. The documentary follows Irwin Cotler and his team fighting for justice and human rights. The film premiered on Human Rights Day, December 10, 2022 at the Cinéma du Musée in Montreal, Quebec.

== Synopsis ==
First to Stand follows Irwin Cotler and his team of young activists at the Raoul Wallenberg Centre as they take on the cases and causes of political prisoners and human rights activists battling against the world’s most repressive regimes.

Cotler began fighting for freedom and justice in law school with the landmark case of refusenik Natan Sharansky, for whom he devised his “mobilization of shame” strategy against the human rights violator — essentially, a PR blitz against a superpower.

Like others who crossed Vladimir Putin’s path, Cotler was poisoned in Moscow. But the attempt on his life did not dampen his commitment. He continues today to be an international activist for the protection of human rights.

First to Stand opens in the streets of Moscow with protesters chanting to bring Putin down, and in the streets of Tehran with women waving their hijabs on the end of sticks. The film takes us to the strategy sessions and through the corridors of power, as Cotler meets with heads of state to argue for his clients’ release.The filmmakers follow Cotler’s clients, their families and supporters, including:

- Raif Badawi, the Saudi blogger who was sentenced to ten years and a thousand lashes for “insulting Islam” by advocating freedom of speech, and his wife Ensaf Haidar, who advocates to exert pressure on the Saudi government for his release.
- Bill Browder, the British-American financier, multimillionaire and Putin’s #1 enemy, who created and championed the Magnitsky Sanctions (also known as the Magnitsky Act), legislation that holds individual human rights abusers accountable.
- Amal Clooney, a British-Lebanese barrister, who specializes in international law and human rights. She is the Deputy Chair of the High-Level Panel of Legal Experts on Media Freedom.
- Shaparak Shajarizadeh, an Iranian woman, who was tortured, then sentenced to 20 years in prison for her protests against compulsory hijab in Iran. She was named "one of the 100 most influential women in the world” by the BBC.
- Natan Sharansky, the Russian refusenik, who was sentenced to 13 years in the gulag for seeking an exit visa to Israel and participating in human rights movements. He is still fighting for human rights in Israel and around the world.
- Masih Alinejad, a journalist, who Iranian agents recently attempted to abduct in a plot thwarted by the FBI.
- James McGovern a member of the United States House of Representatives and co-chair of the Tom Lantos Human Rights Commission of the United States Congress.
- Dikgang Moseneke, former Deputy Chief Justice and currently a judge in South Africa, who shared a cell with Nelson Mandela on Robben Island.

The film covers Irwin Cotler’s work with the international team for Nelson Mandela and with Roméo Dallaire in remembrance of the genocide in Rwanda. Also featured are James McGovern, co-chair of the Tom Lantos Human Rights Commission of the United States Congress; Esther Mujawayo, Rwandan Survivor; Prime Minister Justin Trudeau; and Brandon Silver and Judith Abitan of the Raoul Wallenberg Centre for Human Rights.

First to Stand is about committed human rights activists who know if they stand up, it won't be long before others are standing with them.

== Reception ==
First to Stand opened with the screening and Q&A at the Cinéma du Musée in Montreal on Human Rights Day (December 10, 2022) to a sold-out audience. The film was introduced by human right lawyer and comedian Jess Salomon. Following the screening there was a Q&A with Irwin Cotler, Ensaf Haidar, and Shaparak Shajarizadeh. As a result of the audience reaction, a second screening was added the next night, as well as an extended run.

The film was next presented in at the Hot Docs Cinema by Hot Docs and TJFF, introduced by Helen Zukerman, Payam Akhavan and the filmmakers, and followed by a Q&A with Irwin Cotler and Shaparak Shajarizadeh, moderated by Jay Rosenzweig.

The film was then shown at the Jerusalem Cinematheque, introduced by international human rights champion Natan Sharansky. To meet demand, the Canadian Consulate sponsored a second screening at the Jerusalem Cinematheque, which was also introduced by Mr. Sharansky.

News articles, interviews and review appeared in Canadian and Israeli publications for the screenings. Interviewed by Bill Brownstein of the Montreal Gazette and the filmmakers Angelico and Neidik, Cotler described how his human rights advocacy started. “I was still a student when I got involved in the two great struggles in the second half of the 20th century: the fight against apartheid in South Africa and the battle for human rights in the former Soviet Union….Then as a law professor, I got involved with the political prisoners represented in these struggles, Mandela and Sharansky. That’s how it all began."

Brad Wheeler reported in The Globe and Mail, Irwin Cotler's “speech about oppressive regimes at Toronto’s annual Ideacity conference took place in 2019. Four years later, jackboots are still in fashion.”

Maurie Alioff wrote in Northern Stars, the documentary confronts "themes that couldn't be more relevant in a troubling 21st-century world riddled by rising authoritarianism and the persecution of people who rise up against it.”

At the screening in Israel, Greer Fay Cashman of the Jerusalem Post notes that the “former Canadian Minister of Justice and Attorney General believes that freedom and democracy are synonymous and that a loss of either is a violation of human rights.”

In the Concordia University Press, Randy Pinsky commended the making of the long-awaited film about Irwin Cotler. “After years of hinting and hoping, a documentary was (finally) made about former Canadian Justice Minister and tireless human rights defender, Irwin Cotler... and directed by power couple Irene Lilienheim Angelico and Abbey Jack Neidik...." First to Stand "evokes Irwin Cotler’s passion, brilliance, and tireless commitment to exposing ruthless regimes and demanding the upholding of international rights and freedoms…. As noted by human rights lawyer Amal Clooney, 'When Mr. Cotler speaks, people listen.'"

In POV - Point of View Magazine, Matthew Hays writes that “Cotler’s perceptions of history changed as First to Stand was being completed. ‘What interested me as I watched the film is the role women are playing in these movements. This wasn’t something we foresaw when the filming began. What we’re seeing now, whether in Iran or Sudan or Venezuela, are women at the forefront of these revolutionary movements.’"

== Versions ==
The original feature version is 75 minutes.

The version for TVOntario (TVO) and educational use is 59 minutes.
