= Irene Angelico =

Canadian film director, producer and writer (born 1946)

Irene Lilienheim Angelico
- Born: December 9, 1946 (age 79); Munich, Germany
- Education: Sir George Williams University (BA, 1974)
- Occupations: Film director, producer, writer
- Known for: Dark Lullabies, The Cola Conquest, Black Coffee
- Notable work: Dark Lullabies; The Cola Conquest; Black Coffee; Inside the Great Magazines; Vendetta Song; First to Stand
- Spouse(s): Abbey Jack Neidik (professional and personal partner)
- Children: Toben Max Joseph Neidik
- Website: www.dliproductions.ca

Irene Lilienheim Angelico (born December 9, 1946) is a Canadian film director, producer and writer. known for socially engaged documentaries, particularly on issues related to racism, antisemitism, human rights, media representation, and social justice. Her work often combines investigative journalism with personal testimony and historical analysis. She is known documentaries and series, which include Dark Lullabies, The Cola Conquest, and First to Stand.

== Early life ==
Angelico was born in 1946 in Munich. Her parents, Her parents were Polish Jewish Holocaust Survivors who immigrated to the U.S. after the Liberation. She grew up in New York and later Chicago, and was active in the women’s movement, the civil right movement and against the war in Vietnam. She and her first husband moved to Canada when he lost his Supreme Court appeal as a conscientious objector. She received a BA degree with distinction in the Humanities of Science with distinction from Sir George Williams University in 1974. She married Abbey Neidik, a fellow filmmaker, who would become a frequent collaborator, in 1986. They have one son.

== Career ==
In 1980, Angelico and her partner Abbey Jack Neidik produced and directed the feature documentary Dark Lullabies. The film explored the effect of the Holocaust on children of survivors and second-generation Germans. The film received the first prize for "The Most Socially/Politically Engaging Film" at Mannheim and the prize for "The Most Memorable Film" in Tokyo. It was included in The 250 Greatest Documentaries of all Time at the National Film Board of Canada's "International Salute to the Documentary, the inaugural film at the Stratford Festival Forum, and commemorative screenings in Berlin and Vilnius. The film continues to be screened and broadcast worldwide.

Angelico went on to write and direct several documentary series: 1998's The Cola Conquest about Coca-Cola as a metaphor for America, Black Coffee about the political and social impact of coffee, and Inside the Great Magazines was about the first international media.

Angelico also produced and wrote many documentaries including the 1992 Entre Solitudes about the Anglos of Quebec; The Love Prophet and the Children of God about a sex for salvation cult; She Got Game about the women's tennis tour; Vendetta Song about an honour killing in Turkey; Canadaville, USA about the town Franck Stonach built for Katrina survivors; Unbreakable Minds, a film that humanizes mental illness; and First to Stand, a documentary featuring the work of Irwin Cotler and the Raoul Wallenberg Centre for Human Rights.

Angelico was one of the founding chairs of the Canadian Independent Film Caucus Montreal (CIFC), now known as DOC.

== Filmography ==
- ...And They Lived Happily Ever After, director, editor (1975) (co-directed with Kathleen Shannon).
- Meditation in Motion, director, writer, editor (1979)
- Dark Lullabies, producer, director, writer, editor (1985)
- Entre Solitudes / Between Solitudes, producer (1992)
- The Burning Times, associate producer (1990)
- The Cola Conquest; A Trilogy, producer, director, writer, editor (1998)
- The Love Prophet and the Children of God, producer (1998)
- The Journey Home: a Romanian Adoption, producer (2000)
- She Got Game, producer (2003)
- Vendetta Song producer, writer (2005)
- Unbreakable Minds producer (2005)
- Black Coffee director, writer (2007)
- Inside the Great Magazines, producer, director, writer (2007)
- Canadaville, USA, producer (2008)
- Shekinah: The Intimate Life of Hasidic Women, producer (2013)
- Beyond Earth: the Beginning of NewSpace, producer (2013)
- Big Wind, producer (2015)
- Shekinah Rising, producer (2018)
- Shared Legacies: The African American-Jewish Civil Rights Alliance (2020) First to Stand: The Cases and Causes of Irwin Cotler, producer, director, writer, editor (2022)

== Books ==
- Angelico co-edited The Aftermath: A Survivor's Odyssey Through War-Torn Europe, written by her father, Henry Lilienheim and co-edited by Abbey Neidik and Mark Pendergrast, and The Third Seder: A Haggadah for Yom HaShoah with Yehudi Lindeman.

=== Awards and Honors ===
Canadian Women Behind the Camera (2019, 2020. 2021)

Women in the Director’s Chair (2001)

A Salute to the Documentary (1989)

Founding Chair of CIFC Montreal (now DOC) (1992-3)

Hot Docs Alumnae

Meditation in Motion (1979)

Director, Editor

Dance Film Awards Competition, Honors in Film Category (1980)

American Film Festival- Selected for Screening (1979)

Dark Lullabies (1985)

Producer, Director, Editor, Writer

International Film Festival of Mannheim - Special Prize, Most Socially-Politically Engaging Film (1985)

International film Festival of Mannheim, Interfilm Jury Award - First Prize (1985)

International Film Festival of Mannheim - Education Jury Award (1985)

Torino International Festival of Young Cinema, Prize of the City of Torino - Best Feature Film Nominee (1986)

World Television Festival, Tokyo - Most Memorable Film (1986)

American Film Festival - Red Ribbon (1986)

National Film Board of Canada, A Salute to the Documentary – Official Selection, The Greatest Documentaries from Around the World (1989)

Entre Solitudes / Between Solitudes (1992)

Producer, Editor, Writer

Best Documentary Nomination - Les Prix Gémeaux (1993)

Best Editing Nomination - Les Prix Gémeaux (1993)

Diplôme de participation – FIPA at Cannes, Les Grands Reportages Faits de Societé (1994)

Certificate of Appeciation - Earth Peace International Festival (1983)

A Song for Tibet (1991)

Producer

Genie – Best Short Documentary (1992)

Yorkton Film Festival – Best Documentary of the Year (1992)

Hawaii Film Festival – Best Documentary of the Year (1992)

American Film Festival - Blue Ribbon (1992)

The Cola Conquest; A Trilogy (1998)

Producer, Director, Editor, Writer

Hot Docs - Best Documentary Series - Independent (1999)

Chicago international Television Competition, Silver Hugo - Best Series (1998)

Gemini Awards - Best Writing in a Documentary or Series (1999)

National Education Media Network - Gold Apple (1999)

Gemini Awards - Best Documentary Series Nomination (1999)

Encounter Internacionais de Cinema Documentale, Vila Franca de Xira (1998)

The Love Prophet and the Children of God (1998)

Producer, Writer

Chicago International Television Competition, Gold Plaque - Best Biography of the Year (1998)

Yorktown Short Film and Video Festival - Golden Sheaf Award (1999)

Hot Docs - Best Biography Nominee (1999)

She Got Game (2003)

Producer

Temecula Valley International Film and Music Festival, California - Best Documentary (2003)

Columbus International Film and Video Festival - Chris Statuette (2003)

Sports Movies & TV Milano International FICTS Fest, - Guirlande d'Honneur (2003) participation

Aurora Awards - Gold Awards (2004)

Vendetta Song (2005)

Producer, Writer

Hot Docs CIDA Prize - Best Canadian Documentary on International Development (2005)

Hot Docs - Top Ten Audience Favourites (2005)

Calgary International Film Festival- Best Canadian Documentary (2005)

Rendez-vous du Cinéma Québécois, Quebec Film Critics Association - Best Medium Length Documentary (2005)

Vendetta Song - Rendez-vous du Cinéma Québécois – Choix du public (2005)

Female Eye Film Festival - Best Documentary (2005)

International Women’s Film Festival, Torina - 3^{rd} prize (2006)

Columbus International Film and Video Festival – Humanities – Bronze Plaque (2006)

Unbreakable Minds (2005)

Producer, Writer

Willpower Board of Directors Grateful Appreciation Award (2005)

Black Coffee Part III: Gold In Your Cup (2007)

Director, Editor, Writer

Gemini Best Original Music Score for a Documentary Program or Series – nominee (2006)

Canadaville, USA (2008)

Producer, Writer

Chicago International Film Festival - Merit Prize for Social Political Documentary (2008)

Shekinah: The Intimate Life of Hasidic Women (2013)

Producer, Writer

Crown Heights Film Festival – Best Documentary (2013)

Beyond Earth: the Beginning of NewSpace (2013)

Producer, Writer

Hollywood Independent Documentary Awards - Award Winner (2017)

Beyond Earth Film Festival - Jury’s Special Mention. (2019)

Shared Legacies: The African American-Jewish Civil Rights Alliance (2020)

Editing Consultant

Atlanta Jewish Film Festival - Building Bridges Jury Prize

Pittsburgh Jewish Film Festival – Best Documentary

Mayerson JCC Jewish and Israeli Film Festival - Audience Favorite

First to Stand (2022)

Producer, Director, Editor, Writer

Best Feature Length Documentary, Goldstar Movie Awards, (2023).

Honorable Mention, Mannheim Arts and Film Festival, (2023).

Nominee, Festival des Libertés (Brussels), (2023).

Nominee. Barcelona Indie Awards, (2025).

Honorable Mention. Los Angeles Film and Documentary Awards. (2024).

== See also ==
· 14th Gemini Awards

· Abbey Jack Neidik

· First_to_Stand:_The_Cases_and_Causes_of_Irwin_Cotler

· Shekinah_Rising

· List of Holocaust films

· Mark Pendergrast

== Collections ==
Her work is included in the collections of the National Film Board of Canada, the Australian Centre for the Moving Image and the Cinémathèque québécoise.
