= Ken Schneider (filmmaker) =

American documentary filmmaker and editor

Ken Schneider, ACE is a director, producer, and editor for PatchWorks Films, a production company in San Francisco. He has traveled and made films in Cuba for many years alongside wife and film collaborator, Marcia Jarmel. They co-directed Los Hermanos/The Brothers, which tells the story of virtuoso Afro-Cuban brothers living on opposite sides of a geopolitical chasm, one in New York, the other in Havana. The film follows their parallel lives and poignant reunion through their momentous first performances together after so long apart.

Outside of his directorial work for PatchWorks Films, Schneider works as a freelance editor and is a member of the American Cinema Editors (ACE). He has edited over 40 feature documentaries for PBS, HBO, Showtime, and Al Jazeera. The subjects range from art and literature to war and peace, immigration, disability and social justice. A notable editing credit is on the Oscar-nominated, Regret to Inform, which The New York Times described as "unforgettable ... exquisitely filmed, edited and scored." Regret to Inform was a Peabody Awards winner, recipient of the International Documentary Association Award for most distinctive use of archival footage, and a national Emmy Awards nominee.

Schneider has also consulted on dozens of documentaries and lectured at San Francisco City College, San Francisco Art Institute, Chapman University, Harvard University, and New York University.

== Filmography (as editor) ==
=== War Peace and Human Rights ===
- Regret to Inform | PBS' POV Special (1998, documentary)
- Geographies of Kinship | PBS' America Reframed (2019, documentary)
- The Judge | PBS' Independent Lens (2017, documentary)
- Then They Came For Us (2017, documentary)
- Mankiller | PBS (2017, documentary)
- El Poeta | PBS' Voces (2015, documentary)
- La Principita de los Andes (The Little Princess of the Andes) | Al Jazeera's Witness (2015, documentary)
- 50 Children: The Rescue Mission of Mr. and Mrs. Kraus | HBO (2013, documentary)
- Soft Vengeance: Albie Sachs and the New South Africa (2013, documentary)
- Into the Current (2011, documentary)
- Have You Heard from Johannesburg? | PBS, BBC, South Africa TV (2010, documentary series)
- Bolinao 52 | PBS (2008, documentary)
- The Good War and Those Who Refused to Fight It | PBS Special (2000, documentary)
- Iwo Jima: Memories in Sand | PBS Special (2000, documentary)

=== Art & Artists ===
- Los Hermanos/The Brothers | PBS (2021, documentary)
- Orozco: Man of Fire | PBS' American Masters (2007, documentary)
- Ralph Ellison: An American Journey | PBS' American Masters (2002, documentary)
- In Camera: Naive Visual Effects; The Art of Eiko Ishioka; Method and Madness: Visualizing Dracula (2007, documentary)

=== Contemporary Social Issues ===
- Beyond the Opposite Sex | Showtime Network (2018, documentary)
- In Football We Trust | PBS (2017, documentary)
- Breathin': The Eddy Zheng Story | PBS' America Reframed (2016, documentary)
- Havana Curveball (2014, documentary)
- Awake: The Life of Yogananda (2014, documentary)
- My Favorite Neoconservative (2014, documentary)
- A Fierce Green Fire | American Masters, PBS (2012, documentary)
- Come Hell or High Water | PBS World (2012, documentary)
- Cruz Reynoso: Sowing the Seeds of Justice | PBS (2010, documentary)
- Speaking in Tongues | PBS (2008, documentary)
- Tale of Two Cities | PBS (2004, documentary)
- Hold Your Breath | PBS (2004, documentary)
- Freedom Machines | PBS' POV (2003, documentary)
- Store Wars: When Wal-Mart Comes to Town | PBS Special (2001, documentary)
- Born in the U.S.A. | PBS' Independent Lens (2000, documentary)
- Lieweila | PBS (1997, documentary)
- Ancestors in the Americas: Chinese in the Frontier West | PBS Special (1997, documentary series)
- The Return of Sarah's Daughters | PBS (1997, documentary)
- Making Peace | PBS (1996, documentary series)
- School Colors | PBS Frontline Special (1994, documentary)

== Filmography (as director) ==
- Los Hermanos/The Brothers | PBS (2021, documentary)
- It's Only Rock n' Roll (2019, documentary short)
- And Then They Came for Us (2017, documentary)
- The Wheel of Life (2016, documentary short)
- Havana Curveball (2014, documentary)
- Open the Classroom Door (2013, documentary short)
- Speaking in Tongues | PBS (2008, documentary)
- Born in the U.S.A. | PBS' Independent Lens (2000, documentary)
