= Diamond Diplomacy =

- Directed by: Yuriko Gamo Romer
- Written by: Yuriko Gamo Romer; Ken Schneider
- Produced by: Yuriko Gamo Romer; Marc Smolowitz; Loi Ameera Almeron
- Starring: Masanori “Mashi” Murakami; Warren Cromartie; Ichiro Suzuki; Bobby Valentine
- Release date: 2025

Diamond Diplomacy: U.S. Japan Relations Through a Shared Love of Baseball is a 2025 documentary film that explored the historical and cultural relationship between Japan and the United States through baseball. It was directed by Yuriko Gamo Romer.

The film connects early pioneers such as Masanori Murakami, the first Japanese player in Major League Baseball, and Warren Cromartie, an early American player in the Nippon Professional Baseball, to modern figures like Shohei Ohtani and Ichiro Suzuki. In doing so, it traces more than a century of transpacific exchange or "people-to-people diplomacy" through baseball as a resilient cultural bridge that has persisted over 150 years between the two countries.

== Synopsis ==
Diamond Diplomacy chronicles the 150-year history of baseball as a cultural bridge between the United States and Japan, a form of "people-to-people diplomacy" through shared pastime fostering connection across the Pacific. The film opens with scenes from the climax of the 2023 World Baseball Classic where Dodgers Pitcher Shohei Ohtani strikes out teammate Mike Trout making Japan baseball world champion. The narrative is anchored by the dual perspectives of Masanori "Mashi" Murakami, the first Japanese player to play in Major League Baseball, and Warren Cromartie, an early American player in Japan's Nippon Professional Baseball. It chronicles the breakthrough of Hideo Nomo who joined the Dodgers in 1995 in a deal engineered with agent Don Nomura. Through archival footage, interviews, and historical analysis, the film chronicles key moments in baseball diplomacy interweaving historical milestones with personal stories of athletes. The documentary traces this evolution from early goodwill tours to the modern era, examining the immense cultural ties and global prominence of Japanese players such as Ichiro Suzuki, ending again with Ohtani's current superstardom.

== Cast ==
The documentary centers the historical context of the film, including through archival footage, on the stories of Masanori Murakami, the first Japanese player in Major League Baseball, and Warren Cromartie, an early American player in the Nippon Professional Baseball. More recent Japanese-American MLB players such as Ichiro Suzuki, the first Japanese-American player inducted into the National Baseball Hall of Fame is featured. Current MLB superstar Shohei Ohtani is presented as the contemporary endpoint of baseball exchanges between the countries.

Commentators credited for the documentary include baseball historians John Thorn, Nobby Ito, Rob Fitts, Bill Staples, Jr., and Kerry Yo Nakagawa.

== Production ==
Director and producer Yuriko Gamo Romer at the 2026 Tokyo International Film Festival for Diamond Diplomacy

The United States-Japan Foundation supported early support for the film providing seed funding. Another $40,000 in crowd funding contributed until a $600,000 grant was secured from the National Endowment for the Humanities (NIH). The NIJH funding was secured through the Center for Independent Documentary as fiscal sponsor.

In April 2025, the documentary was caught in the crosshairs of DOGE's as the agency made mass cuts to humanities grants and its funding was cancelled without notice. This came a month before the film's planned screening at the National Baseball Hall of Fame in May. At the time, only $250,000 of the $600,000 grant had been disbursed. Romer noted that she had project put expenses on her credit card and 14 employees on payroll, expenses she could not pay without the remaining funding.

In August 2025, the film announced that it had secured funding with philanthropist Glen S. Fukushima, a former American diplomat and Japan expert, stepping in to close the film's $300,000 funding gap. His actions led Robert Whiting to describe his role as that of "a hero". Fukushima is credited as an executive producer.

== Release ==
The documentary had its first public screening as a "sneak preview" at the National Baseball Hall of Fame as part of its Hall of Fame Film Series on May 22, 2025.

The documentary's world premiere was at the 48th Mill Valley Film Festival on October 2.

Following Mill Valley, the film was screened at the Newport Beach Film Festival in California, Hawaiʻi International Film Festival in Honolulu, Tallgrass Film Festival in Kansas, and Hot Springs Documentary Film Festival in Arkansas.

== Reception ==
The film was runner-up for the Library of Congress/Lavine/Ken Burns Prize for Film with Ken Burns stating it "gave me an even greater appreciation of how America’s pastime can transcend borders." The annual award is bestowed by the Librarian of Congress in partnership with The Better Angels Society.

The documentary was described as "compelling" by the San Francisco Examiner. Robert Whiting wrote that the film was "a home run" while the Hot Springs Sentinel Record wrote that it "beautifully showcases how the sport can bridge culture."

The Japan Times described the film as "More than a sports story, Diamond Diplomacy is a reflection on friendship, memory, and the ability of a simple game to transcend borders.” The Rafu Shimpo stated, “Rarely do sports documentaries feel this fresh. A must-see for baseball fans, blending history with cultural contrasts between U.S. and Japanese training styles. Insightful, powerful, and one of the best in years.”
