= For Better or For Worse (1993 film) =

1993 film

- Directed by: David Collier
- Produced by: David Collier; Betsy Thompson; Marcia Jarmel
- Cinematography: David Collier
- Edited by: David Collier; Marcia Jarmel
- Music by: Mark Adler
- Distributed by: Direct Cinema Limited
- Release date: 1993
- Running time: 57 minutes
- Country: United States
- Language: English

For Better or For Worse is a 1993 American documentary film produced by David Collier. It was nominated for an Academy Award for Best Documentary Feature at the 66th Academy Awards. It also aired as an episode of the PBS series POV.

== Synopsis ==
The film explores the lives and relationships of five couples married for fifty years or longer. The couples discuss the issues that inform every long-term relationship. They recount stories of their shared journeys, from living room jazz jam sessions, to the Gay Pride parade in New York, to the backwoods of Northern California.
