= Irwin Cotler =

Canadian politician (born 1940)

The Honourable Irwin Cotler PC OC OQ
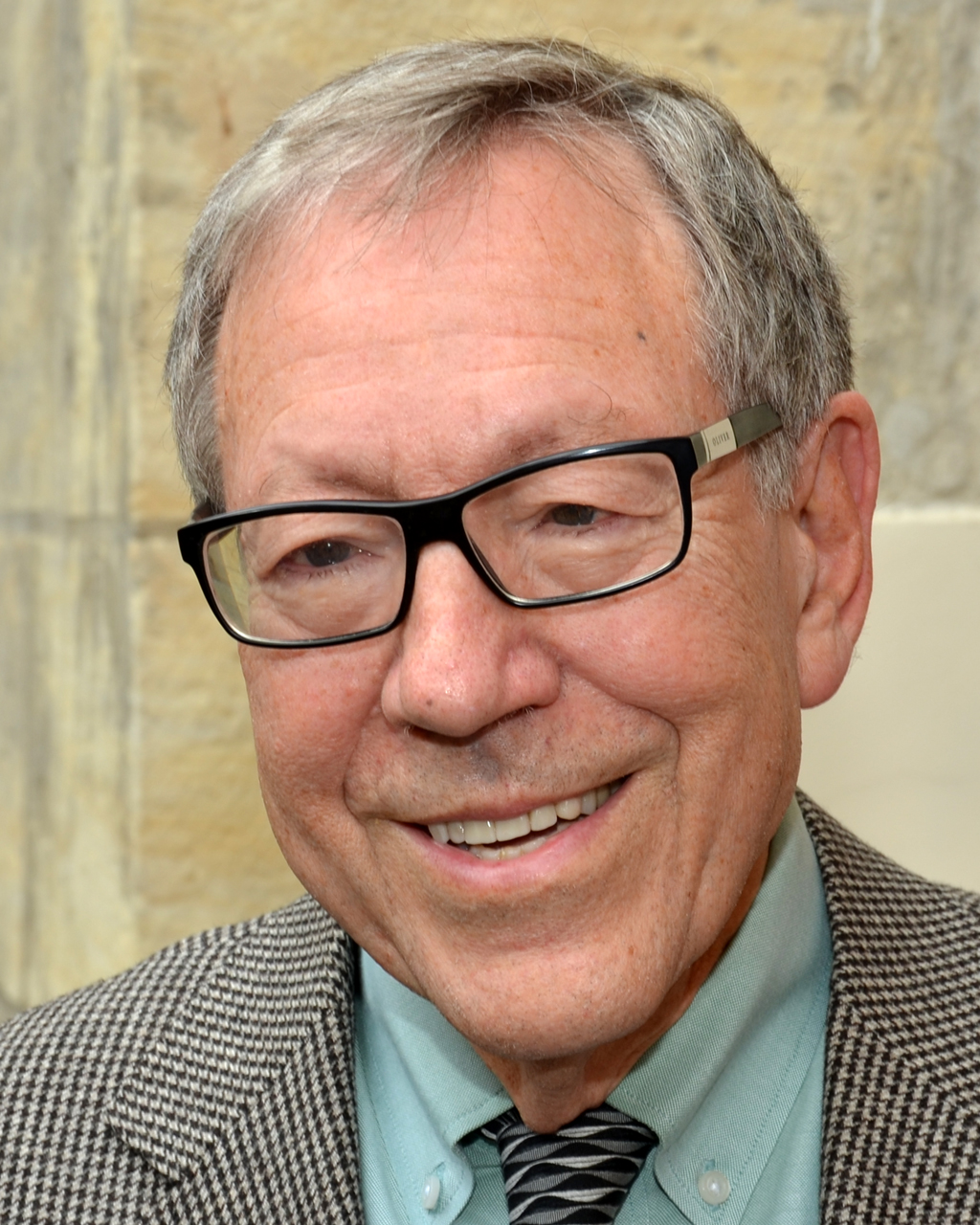
- Cotler in 2017

Minister of Justice Attorney General of Canada
- In office 12 December 2003 – 5 February 2006
- Prime Minister: Paul Martin
- Preceded by: Martin Cauchon
- Succeeded by: Vic Toews

Member of Parliament for Mount Royal
- In office 15 November 1999 – 4 August 2015
- Preceded by: Sheila Finestone
- Succeeded by: Anthony Housefather

Personal details
- Born: 8 May 1940 (age 86) Montreal, Quebec, Canada
- Party: Liberal
- Spouse: Ariela Ze'evi (m. 1979)
- Children: 3
- Relatives: Michal Cotler-Wunsh (stepdaughter)
- Profession: Lawyer, law professor, Founder and Chair of the Raoul Wallenberg Centre for Human Rights

Irwin Cotler PC OC OQ (born 8 May 1940) is a retired Canadian politician who was Member of Parliament for Mount Royal from 1999 to 2015. He served as the Minister of Justice and Attorney General of Canada from 2003 until the Liberal government of Paul Martin lost power following the 2006 federal election. He was first elected to the House of Commons of Canada in a by-election in November 1999, winning 92% of votes cast.

== Early life and education ==
The son of a lawyer, Cotler was born in Montreal, Quebec to a Jewish family. As a child, Cotler's father brought him to Delorimier Stadium in 1946 where the two saw Jackie Robinson on the field, with Cotler saying this moment inspired his interest in civil liberties as he and his father discussed anti-racism.

Cotler received his B.A. (1961) and BCL (1964) degree from McGill University and was an editor of the McGill Law Journal. He then graduated from Yale Law School with an LL.M.

== Career ==
=== Academia ===
After working as a speechwriter for federal Minister of Justice John Turner from 1968 until 1972, Cotler entered academia in 1970 beginning his career as an associate professor at Osgoode Hall Law School. Cotler was a professor of law at McGill University and the director of its Human Rights Program from 1973 until his election as a Member of Parliament in 1999 for the Liberal Party of Canada. He has also been a visiting professor at Harvard Law School, a Woodrow Wilson Fellow at Yale Law School and is the recipient of eleven honorary doctorates.

=== Political career ===
Cotler served on the Standing Committee on Foreign Affairs and its Subcommittee on Human Rights and International Development, as well as on the Standing Committee on Justice and Human Rights. In 2000, he was appointed special advisor to the Minister of Foreign Affairs on the International Criminal Court.

==== Minister of Justice ====
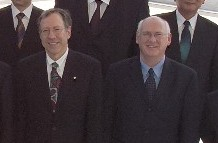
Irwin Cotler (left) (11 May 2004, Washington, D.C.)

On 12 December 2003, Prime Minister Paul Martin appointed him to Cabinet as Minister of Justice and Attorney General of Canada. He recommended the appointment of two women to the Supreme Court of Canada: Louise Charron and Rosalie Abella, Canada's first Jewish woman Supreme Court justice. Cotler attempted to introduce several bills to decriminalize marijuana. As Minister of Justice, Cotler tabled Canada's first-ever National Justice Initiative Against Racism, in parallel with the government's National Action Plan Against Racism. He was tasked with prioritising the situation of indigenous peoples in Canada and implemented a policy "known as the seven R’s: recognition, respect, redress, representation, responsiveness, reconciliation and relationships."

As Minister of Justice, Cotler presided over many legislative changes concerning national security. This included proposed changes to privacy legislation known as "Lawful Access" to give police and intelligence officers the tools to conduct surveillance of electronic communications for law enforcement and national security purposes.

In early 2005, Cotler intervened in the senate review of Canada's 2001 Anti-Terrorism Act, as mandated by section 145 of the bill. This law, adopted in the wake of the September 11 attacks, had been criticized by some human rights groups and defense lawyers, as an unreasonable trade-off between security and freedom. In his speech to the senate committee on the matter, Cotler rejected these concerns, arguing that "there is no contradiction in the protection of security and the protection of human rights".

==== Liberal Party ====
On 22 February 2006, the Liberal Party appointed Cotler Critic for Public Safety and Emergency Preparedness in the opposition shadow cabinet for the 39th Canadian Parliament. On 18 January 2007, Cotler was appointed Critic for Human Rights by newly elected leader Stéphane Dion.

Cotler was re-elected to Parliament in the 2008 election to represent the Mount Royal riding in Quebec with 55% of the vote. In January 2009, Cotler was named Special Counsel on Human Rights and International Justice for the Liberal Party, under Michael Ignatieff, and subsequently Critic for Human Rights.

He was re-elected again in the 2011 election, fending off a serious challenge from former city councillor Saulie Zajdel, a longtime Liberal supporter running as a Conservative who lost by only 2,500 votes. It was only the third time that the Liberals had been seriously threatened in Mount Royal since 1940, and the closest that a centre-right party has come to winning anywhere in Montreal since 1993.

In May 2011, Cotler was named Justice and Human Rights critic by interim Liberal leader Bob Rae. Cotler also chaired the Inter-Parliamentary Group for Human Rights in Iran, the Inter-Parliamentary Group of Justice for Sergei Magnitsky, and the All-Party Save Darfur Coalition.

In 2013, Cotler was chosen to represent the Liberal Party of Canada at the funeral of Nelson Mandela in deference to the work he did for and with Mandela in fighting Apartheid. Party Leader Justin Trudeau gave up his seat for him.

On 5 February 2014, Cotler announced he was not running in the 42nd Canadian federal election. He said he would remain "active in public life, lecturing and writing on the issues of the day, advancing the causes of human rights and international justice, and advocating on behalf of political prisoners."

== Post-political career ==
Cotler was one of thirteen Canadians banned from traveling to Russia under retaliatory sanctions imposed by Russian president Vladimir Putin in March 2014. He replied through his official Twitter feed, "I see my travel ban from Russia as a badge of honour, not a mark of exclusion."

In November 2024, the Royal Canadian Mounted Police told Cotler that it had stopped an assassination attempt on him by the Iranian government the previous month. Cotler, a fierce critic of the Iranian government, confirmed that he had been under police protection for more than a year.

In 2025, Cotler endorsed the Bloc Québécois's Alexis Brunelle-Duceppe.

== Activism ==
=== Human rights ===
Cotler is on the Board of Advancing Human Rights. Cotler spoke at the Geneva Summit for Human Rights and Democracy on several occasions.

=== Jewish and Israel activism ===
Cotler is a past president of the Canadian Jewish Congress, a member of MEMRI's Board of Advisors, an Honorary Member of the International Raoul Wallenberg Foundation, serves as a member of the Advisory Board of the Genesis Prize Foundation and is a board member of the Israel Council on Foreign Relations. Studying antisemitism, Cotler separated it into six categories and found thirteen indices of discrimination against Jews that characterizes the "new anti-Jewishness".

In 1986 he was named chief counsel to the Canadian Jewish Congress at the Deschênes Commission of Inquiry on Nazi war criminals.

Cotler worked with a group of international jurists to indict Iranian president Ahmadinejad for incitement to genocide under the UN Charter and the Genocide Convention, saying that the Iranian government used anti-Jewish rhetoric similar to the Nazi Party. When asked how he would distinguish between hate speech and incitement to genocide, Cotler contended in 2009 that what he described as Ahmadinejad's calling for the "elimination of the Zionist regime" in 2006 amounted to advocating for "the extermination of a state and its people". In 2006, Ahmadinejad was reported as saying "The Zionist regime will disappear soon, the same way the Soviet Union disappeared”. The correct translation of a previous 2005 speech by Ahmadinejad on Israel's future has been the subject of considerable debate. He has been quoted as having called for Israel to be eliminated by MEMRI, an organization which was co-founded by a former Israeli intelligence officer., or by multiple news outlets as having called for Israel to be "wiped off the map" while many Persian speakers have stated this was a mistranslation. In a 2012 interview with Aljazeera, Israel’s then minister of intelligence and atomic energy suggested that neither Ahmadinejad nor Iran's ruling cleric Ali Khamenei had stated "We’ll wipe it out" but rather "It will not survive". Cotler chaired a commission called the "Responsibility to Prevent Coalition", which released a petition in 2009 entitled "The Danger of a Genocidal and Nuclear Iran: A Responsibility to Prevent Petition". The petition was signed by Elie Wiesel, Former UN High Commissioner for Human Rights Louise Arbour, and the former Swedish Deputy Prime Minister Per Ahlmark, and historian Yehuda Bauer. Cotler is an advisory board member of United Against Nuclear Iran and the Counter Extremism Project.

In 2012, Cotler advised Canadian foreign minister John Baird on rejecting the recognition of the State of Palestine during a United Nations meeting.

Cotler is a close friend of American lawyer Alan Dershowitz; the two met at Yale University in the 1960s. Dershowitz's book Abraham was dedicated to Cotler, who Dershowitz described as "a modern-day Abraham." In 2016, the two were named by The Jerusalem Post as "perhaps, the two most eloquent international advocates for Israel and human rights." Dershowitz nominated Cotler for the Nobel Peace Prize the same year.

In 2016, Irwin Cotler drafted the "'Never Again' Declaration", which has been signed by justice ministers, parliamentarians, jurists, and Luis Moreno Ocampo, former International Criminal Court prosecutor.

Cotler has been criticized as being anti-Palestinian, though he denied the description, saying he supports a two-state solution and criticized the Palestinian National Authority, saying "unfortunately, the Palestinian leadership has never missed an opportunity to miss an opportunity." Cotler was one of a group of legal scholars who unsuccessfully argued that the International Criminal Court should not have jurisdiction over crimes committed in the West Bank, Gaza and East Jerusalem because Palestine should not be understood as a "state" within the meaning of Article 12(2)(a) of the Court's Rome Statute or international law generally.

In January 2024, he criticized South Africa's ICJ genocide case against Israel, saying that "Israel consistently seeks to minimize harm to civilians [in Gaza] using measures including leaflets, messages and phone calls to urge civilians to evacuate targeted areas, creating humanitarian zones and corridors, and facilitating humanitarian aid."

=== Prisoner representation ===
Cotler began representing notable prisoners with the Natan Sharansky case, who was imprisoned in the Soviet gulag for Jewish activism. In 1977, Sharansky's wife asked Cotler to represent Natan when the two met in Israel. Cotler went to the Soviet Union in 1979 to represent Sharansky, though he was deported. Sharansky was released in 1986 by Mikhail Gorbachev and went on to become Israeli Deputy Prime Minister. According to Cotler, the case taught him that "[i]t was very important for mobilizing public opinion" and that "[t]he tipping point for the release of political prisoners is not necessarily the injustice of the case, ... It’s when you can make the case that it’s in their self-interest to release the prisoner because it’s costing them."

In 1981, Cotler visited South Africa after being invited by anti-apartheid activists, being detained after giving the speech titled "If Sharansky, Why Not Mandela?" At the request of Nelson Mandela's South African legal team, Cotler allegedly took on the role of "Canadian counsel" to Mandela at the end of the visit, participating in anti-apartheid activities in Canada and advocating on Mandela's behalf with Amnesty International. The claim that Cotler was arrested or ever represented Mandela in any capacity has been disputed by the Nelson Mandela Foundation and two prominent South African lawyers, including a surviving member of Mandela's legal team. However, in 1986, United Press International reported that Alan Dershowitz had claimed he, Cotler and an unnamed person were working on an attempt to negotiate Mandela's release through a prisoner exchange. Dershowitz has since written that on Thanksgiving Day 1985 he had "agreed on the parameters of an exchange of prisoners that also involved South Africa" during a meeting in Europe in a meeting with a Soviet "spy trader" but that Mandela had refused to participate in any prison exchange.

Cotler went on to represent other imprisoned individuals, including Jacobo Timmerman in Latin America, Muchtar Pakpahan in Asia. Saad Eddin Ibrahim, an Egyptian democracy activist imprisoned by the Egyptian government, was represented by Cotler and acquitted in 2003. He acted as counsel to Maher Arar during part of Arar's imprisonment and supported demands for a public inquiry. He has also defended both Palestinians and Israelis against their own governments, and participated in a minor role in the Camp David peace agreement between Israel and Egypt.

Imprisoned Venezuelan opposition politician Leopoldo López chose Cotler to serve as an attorney on his defense team in 2015. In 2017, Cotler was then asked to join a panel of independent international experts designated by Luis Almagro, the Secretary General of the Organization of American States, to determine whether there was reasonable ground to believe that crimes against humanity have been committed in Venezuela.

== Personal life ==
Cotler's wife, Ariela (née Ze'evi), is a native of Jerusalem and worked as a legislative assistant and parliamentary secretary to Menachem Begin and the GH”L party (and subsequently the Likud) from 1967-79. Cotler met Ariela at a lunch with the Knesset in 1977, the same year the Likud Party, which Begin co-founded, published its original party platform, which proclaimed that "Judea and Samaria [the West Bank] will not be handed to any foreign administration" and that "between the Sea and the Jordan there will only be Israeli sovereignty". Cotler was asked to deliver a letter from Egyptian president Anwar Sadat to the Israeli prime minister and former leader of the Irgun paramilitary organization, Menachem Begin, a letter that included peace negotiation proposals. The two married on 26 March 1979, the day that the Egypt–Israel peace treaty was signed. Cotler became a step-father to Ariela's daughter Michal Cotler-Wunsh, who he adopted when the couple moved to Montreal, and the two had three other children; Gila, Tanya and Jonathan. Cotler-Wunsh is an attorney and a PhD candidate in law at the Hebrew University of Jerusalem. She was a Member of the Knesset for the Blue and White alliance during the 23rd Knesset, from 2020 until 2021.

== Awards and achievements ==
Cotler was appointed in 1992 as an Officer of the Order of Canada. He received fifteen honorary doctorate degrees. Cotler received an honorary doctorate from McGill University on 30 May 2019, and gave the commencement address during the Faculty of Law's convocation ceremony. In 2022, he was profiled in the documentary film First to Stand: The Cases and Causes of Irwin Cotler. In 2023, he was awarded Israel's Presidential Medal of Honour by Israeli President Isaac Herzog. Also in 2023, he was awarded the Lantos Human Rights Prize.

27th Canadian Ministry (2003–2006) – Cabinet of Paul Martin
Cabinet post (1)
Predecessor	Office	Successor
Martin Cauchon	Minister of Justice; 2003–2006	Vic Toews
Parliament of Canada
Preceded by Sheila Finestone	Member of Parliament for Mount Royal; 1999–2015	Succeeded by Anthony Housefather
Other offices
Preceded by Gunther Plaut	President of the Canadian Jewish Congress; 1980–1983	Succeeded by Milton E. Harris
