= Shekinah Rising =

- Film poster
- Directed by: Abbey Jack Neidik
- Produced by: Abbey Jack Neidik; Irene Angelico; Ina Fichman
- Release date: October 24, 2013
- Country: Canada
- Language: English

Shekinah Rising, the sequel to Shekinah: The Intimate Life of Hasidic Women, is a Canadian documentary produced in 2013, which explores the lives and attitudes of young Hasidic women at a Chabad-run seminary in Ste Agathe, Quebec. The documentary covers the perspectives of the female students, as well as religious views of former students in Hasidic communities in London, Belgium and France. The film was directed by Abbey Jack Neidik and produced by Abbey Neidik and Irene Angelico of DLI Productions, and Ina Fichman of Intuitive Pictures.

The filming of the documentary took four years to complete. The film is described as an attempt to demonstrate how Hasidic women are not treated as "second-class citizens" in their community, and features Hasidic women pointing to customs that they would not agree to adhere to. One scene in the first Shekinah film captures the persistence of antisemitism in Sainte-Agathe-des-Monts and the Hasidic effort to respond with outreach efforts. One of the main characters in both films is Rebbetzin Chanie Carlebach, mother of twelve and the director of the Chabad seminary in Ste-Agathe.

== See also ==
- Chabad in film and television
- Kosher Love
- The Return of Sarah's Daughters
