= Mirror Mirror: A History of the Human Love Affair With Reflection =

2003 book by Mark Pendergrast

- Author: Mark Pendergrast
- Language: English
- Genre: Non-fiction
- Publisher: Basic Books
- Publication date: 2003
- Publication place: United States
- Pages: 404
- ISBN: 0-465-05470-6

Mirror Mirror: A History of the Human Love Affair With Reflection is a 2003 nonfiction book written by American investigative journalist Mark Pendergrast. It was widely reviewed.

== Synopsis ==
Pendergrast attempts to cover the history of mirrors and other reflective, refractive, or transparent materials and objects. He begins in antiquity, citing references as old as 6200 to 4500 BCE. He continues the thread to today, including space investigations, X-rays and kaleidoscopes.
