= Young Abraham =

- DVD cover
- Written by: Ron Mezey
- Produced by: Oliver Cohen; Charlie Cohen; Moshe Dayan; Sidney El Hadad; Janet Zucker
- Edited by: Todd Shaffer
- Production company: Big Bang Digital Studios
- Release date: April 2011
- Language: English
- Budget: 1.8 million

Young Abraham is a CGI animated film portraying the early years of biblical Abraham.

== Plot ==
The film opens with a portentous observation by King Nimrod's chief stargazer. He witnesses one star consuming four surrounding stars, after which an ethereal light emanating from the remaining star bathes one house in the city of Ur Kaśdim, the seat of Nimrod's kingdom. Inside this home, a baby has been born to Nimrod's general Terakh and his wife, Amaslei. Spurred by his stargazer's warnings of impending rebellion by this infant, Nimrod orders young Abraham put to death.

Terakh deceives Nimrod and furnishes the baby of his servant girl to take Abraham's place. Amaslei flees, and for the next several years she rears Avraham in hiding. Early on, Avraham displays high intelligence and he quickly arrives at the conclusion of a singular god. Emboldened by his discovery of God in a pervasively polytheistic land, he returns to Ur Kaśdim where he assumes a janitorial position at his father's idol shop. One day, Utz visits the shop to buy an idol. Abraham innocently asks Utz to explain how an inanimate idol of stone can provide for and he urges Utz to disavow idolatry. Then, after destroying all the idols in the shop, Avraham places the mallet into the hand of a stone likeliness of Nimrod, the largest idol in the shop and attempts to mollify his father Terakh, insisting that the idol of Nimrod was the perpetrator of the iconoclasm. Enraged by the carnage of his idols, Terakh permits Nimrod's men to frogmarch his son to Nimrod to be condemned for his blasphemous and treasonable actions.

Abraham breaks loose of the guard's grip en route the palace, and finds himself on the run once again. After a fortuitous encounter with an angel, who saves him from certain death in the desert, Abraham is led by the angel to the yeshiva of Noah. Noah takes Abraham under his wing and eventually instructs a now-matured and grown up Abraham to return to Ur Kaśdim and smash the pyramid of Mesopotamian idolatry.

The final scene of the film is a showdown in which Abraham defiantly refuses to acknowledge Nimrod's bald self-declaration as "God Supreme" of the world. An infuriated Nimrod hurls Abraham into a bonfire, but he miraculously survives before the eyes of a repentant Nimrod, who now recognizes the God of Abraham and instructs his people to convert to Abraham's monotheistic beliefs.

== Cast ==
- Adam Koren as Abraham
- Burney Lieberman as Nimrod
- Pichas Blitt as Noach

== Production ==
Drawing on the Bible, Midrash and numerous commentaries, Rabbis Yisroel Bernath and Zvi Hershcovich researched and wrote the first draft of the script.

A production of Bible Kids Club, the film was produced for direct-to-video release by Big Bang Digital Studios. The film was directed by Todd Shaffer and produced by Oliver Cohen, Charlie Cohen, Moshe Dayan and Sidney El Hadad. The four-year-long project was produced at a budget of $1.8 million. The film was released in 2011.

== Reception ==
Young Abraham has been well received by audiences and has garnered positive reviews. In a feature article for Lubavitch News Service/Lubavitch.com, Mendy Rimler wrote, "...the climax and message of the CGI (computer generated imagery) animated motion picture, a vivid and compelling retelling of the biblical and Midrashic story of Abraham’s discovery of God: At last, kosher entertainment with Jewish and visual depth."

The Dove Foundation awarded Young Abraham five doves, their highest rating.
