= Kosher Love =

2017 Canadian documentary film

- Directed by: Evan Beloff
- Written by: Evan Beloff
- Produced by: Frederic Bohbot
- Starring: Yisroel Bernath
- Distributed by: CBC Television
- Release date: 2017
- Country: Canada

Kosher Love is a 2017 Canadian documentary film of love as understood by Orthodox and Hasidic Jews. The documentary was directed by filmmaker Evan Beloff and aired on the CBC-TV television channel. The film was also entered into Jewish Film Festivals in Canada, the United States, and in Poland.

== Background ==
Kosher Love was commissioned by the Canadian Broadcasting Corporation, and notedly focuses on the advice and guidance offered by Rabbi Yisroel Bernath of the Chabad Hasidic community. Bernath serves as the spiritual director of a Chabad House in Notre-Dame-de-Grâce and as the chaplain at Concordia University (Loyola Campus). Prior to the making of Kosher Love, Bernath received public attention for his matchmaking service known as "JMontreal" which represent an attempt to offer formal matchmaking services in addition to more common pastoral care offered by rabbis. While Bernath is portrayed in the film as a friendly and affable, he is viewed somewhat critically in the Jewish community press for a perceived dismissiveness of all non-Orthodox religious denominations.

The film was written and directed by Evan Beloff and produced by Frederic Bohbot. Both Beloff and Bohbot are secular Jewish filmmakers from Montreal but have turned to the Hasidic Bernath for guidance. The film was noted for offering an engaging and friendly introduction to religious Jewish perspectives on the subjects of love and marriage. The documentary is described as offering an intriguing yet whimsical view of religious approaches to the quest for love, and of an interweaving of a complex religious narrative involving the exploration of love as both an object of fear and of sacredness. The film purports to explore the challenges facing secular Jews who attempt to reconcile religious views of marriage as an imperative to unmarried Jews, in particular, the challenge concerns Hasidic approaches to marriage which may involve notions of arranged-marriages. Subsequently, the film was nominated as a finalist for the Canadian Screen Award for Best Documentary Program at the 6th Canadian Screen Awards in 2018.

== See also ==
- Shekinah Rising
- The Return of Sarah's Daughters
