= Mark Pendergrast =

American scholar and writer (born 1948)

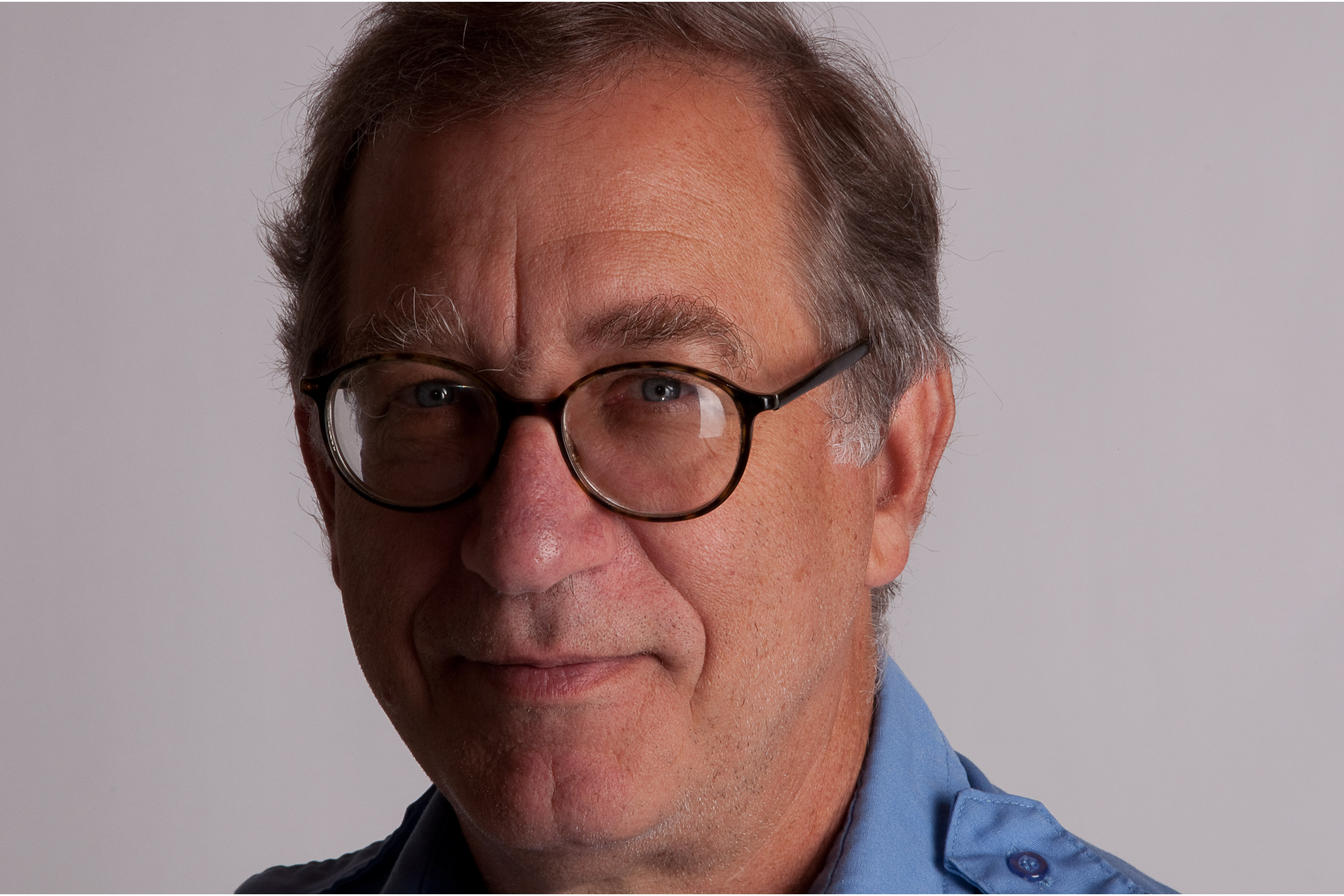
- Born: 1948 (age 77–78); Atlanta, Georgia
- Education: Harvard College and Simmons College in Boston
- Occupation: Author
- Notable work: The Most Hated Man in America: Jerry Sandusky and the Rush to Judgement

Mark Pendergrast (born 1948) is an American independent scholar and author of fourteen books, including three children's books. His books are mainly non-fiction and cover a wide range of topics, most notably repressed memories. He is a volunteer with the National Center for Reason and Justice, a non-profit organization that advocates for people who are falsely accused or convicted of crimes.

== Early life and education ==
Pendergrast was born in 1948 to Nan and Britt Pendergrast, the fourth of seven children. He was raised in Atlanta, Georgia. He earned a Bachelor of Arts degree in English Literature from Harvard College, after which he taught for several years in public schools. Pendergrast later attended Simmons College in Boston, where he obtained a Master of Arts degree in Library Science. He worked as an academic librarian and freelance writer until becoming a full-time writer in 1991. Pendergrast lives in Colchester, Vermont.

As a child during road trips with his family, Pendergrast would sing Broadway tunes harmonizing along with his older brother. Pendergrast currently sings in a Vermont choral group called Social Band. He puts poetry to music for concerts with the group and has written songs including "Donald Trump Satirical Song" which Pendergrast wrote several months before Donald Trump's election.

== Career ==
=== Author ===
Pendergrast has published fourteen books on various topics.

Two are histories of caffeinated beverages: Coca-Cola (For God, Country and Coca-Cola) and coffee (Uncommon Grounds). Pendergrast states that he wrote For God, Country and Coca-Cola after literary agents moved to Vermont and wrote a letter to the League of Vermont Writers for book ideas. He also states that growing up in Atlanta, GA influenced his decision to write the book. His grandfather was a pharmacist who served some of the original Coca-Cola, which was originally sold as a health elixir.

He has written extensively on the malleability of human memory in his books Memory Warp, The Repressed Memory Epidemic, Victims of Memory, and The Most Hated Man in America. Pendergrast states his most important work is Victims of Memory, which is about recovered memory therapy, a pseudoscientific therapeutic method that has resulted in false accusations of child sexual abuse. He wrote Memory Warp, written twenty years after Victims of Memory, to document the continuation of recovered memory therapy beyond the 80s and 90s for new generations of journalists, therapists, and patients. He is highly critical of Freud's methods in developing his theories in Memory Warp.

His book on the Jerry Sandusky case, The Most Hated Man in America, was prompted by a 2013 email from an Oregon woman, named Glenna Kerker, who told him that the case had a lot of testimony based on repressed memory therapy. Pendergrast wrote his original arguments for Sandusky's innocence in The Crime Report in 2016 while working on The Most Hated Man in America. Freudian psychoanalysis critic, Frederick Crews, wrote an article in Skeptic magazine detailing the Sandusky case, primarily using arguments from The Most Hated Man in America.

Joseph Stains reviews Pendergrast's 2017 book The Most Hated Man in America: Jerry Sandusky and the Rush to Judgement. Stain says it is "probably the most evenhanded and thoroughly documented volume on the topic". Pendergrast detailed the trial and did extensive research on the subject of Jerry Sandusky's 2012 guilty verdict for sexual abuse of young men at Penn State. Stains writes that Pendergrast made a compelling case that the small-town lawyer Sandusky chose to represent him and a prosecution that relied on repressed memories, no physical evidence and possible financial motives may have been the factors that led to the court finding him guilty. Stains states that Pendergrast "has done meticulous background work... and he provides material background for answering any question one may pose to him".

Inside the Outbreaks is about the Epidemic Intelligence Service (EIS), which is part of the Centers for Disease Control and Prevention (CDC). Beth E. Meyerson describes the book as "a series of investigations presented in a rapid succession, bespeaking the range and pace of public health challenges facing this elite scientific corps of men and women," in a Environmental Health Perspectives book review article. The book is divided into three sections, each of which covers a period of time in EIS history in chronological order.

City of the Verge is a book about his hometown of Atlanta, GA. He named the book City on the Verge because of the anticipated influx of people into the city of Atlanta. According to Pendergrast, in 2017, the population within the city is expected to triple in the next 30 years.

Japan’s Tipping Point investigates Japan's renewable energy policies after the Fukushima nuclear disaster. Pendergrast spent six weeks in Japan for the book.

Mirror, Mirror covers a wide range of subjects ranging from astronomy to human sexuality and vanity.

Beyond Fair Trade is a book about the Akha hill tribe in Thailand that grows coffee rather than opium poppies after opium raids forced them to relocate in 1985. It also examines the history of the specialty coffee movement.

His three children's books are Jack and the Bean Soup; Silly Sadie; and The Godfool. He has also appeared in several documentaries, including Black Coffee and Cola Conquest, which were in part inspired by his books. Pendergrast also helped to edit and publish The Aftermath: A Survivor’s Odyssey Through War-Torn Europe, a Holocaust memoir by Henry Lilienheim, Shift, poems by Marylen Grigas; Neighborhood Naturalist, by Nan Pendergrast; and For Love of the British Isles, by Nan Pendergrast.

=== Book reviewer ===
Pendergrast has also reviewed books for The Philadelphia Inquirer and The Atlanta Journal-Constitution. He has contributed articles to The Wall Street Journal, The New York Times, the Financial Analyst, The Sun, Vermont Life Magazine, Burlington Free Press, Vanguard, Sea History, Library Journal, Atlanta Magazine, Vermont Digger, Saporta Report, Fresh Cup, Tea & Coffee Trade Journal, Business People, Professional Psychology, Wine Spectator, and other publications.

=== Public appearances ===
He has spoken at scientific and journalism seminars, book festivals, public events, and on college campuses and has appeared on various television and radio programs, including The Today Show, All Things Considered, Marketplace, and Fresh Air. He writes a semi-regular column about coffee for the Wine Spectator.

=== Documentary appearances ===
He has been the featured interviewee in two documentary series inspired by his books, The Cola Conquest, directed by Irene Angelico and produced by Angelico and Abbey Jack Neidik of DLI Productions, and Black Coffee, also directed by Irene Angelico.

=== Organizational affiliations ===
Pendergrast is a member of the National Association of Science Writers, the League of Vermont Writers, and the Authors Guild. He is a volunteer for the National Center for Reason and Justice, a nonprofit organization which works with innocent people falsely accused or convicted of child abuse (related to the subject of his book Memory Warp).

== Published works ==
=== Non-fiction ===
- Pendergrast, Mark (1996). Victims of Memory: Sex Abuse Accusations and Shattered Lives (2nd ed.). Upper Access. ISBN 0-942679-18-0.
- Pendergrast, Mark (2003). Mirror Mirror: A History of the Human Love Affair With Reflection. Basic Books. ISBN 0-465-05470-6.
- Pendergrast, Mark (2010). Uncommon Grounds: The History of Coffee and How It Transformed Our World (2nd ed.). Basic Books. ISBN 978-0-465-05467-1.
- Pendergrast, Mark (2010). Inside the Outbreaks: The Elite Medical Detectives of the Epidemic Intelligence Service. Houghton Mifflin Harcourt. ISBN 978-0-15-101120-9.
- Pendergrast, Mark (2011). Japan's Tipping Point: Crucial Choices in the Post-Fukushima World. Nature's Face Publications. ISBN 978-0982900437.
- Pendergrast, Mark (2013). For God, Country, and Coca-Cola: The Definitive History of the Great American Soft Drink and the Company That Makes It (3rd ed.). Basic Books. ISBN 978-0-465-05468-8.
- Pendergrast, Mark (2015). Beyond Fair Trade: How One Small Coffee Company Helped Transform a Hillside Village in Thailand. Greystone Books. ISBN 978-1771640473.
- Pendergrast, Mark (2017). City on the Verge: Atlanta and the Fight for America's Urban Future. Basic Books. ISBN 978-0465054732.
- Pendergrast, Mark (2017). Memory Warp: How the Myth of Repressed Memories Arose and Refuses to Die. Upper Access. ISBN 978-0-942679-41-0.
- Pendergrast, Mark (2017). The Repressed Memory Epidemic: How It Happened and What We Need to Learn from It. Springer. ISBN 978-3319633749.
- Pendergrast, Mark (2017). The Most Hated Man in America: Jerry Sandusky and the Rush to Judgement. Sunbury. ISBN 978-1620067659.

=== Children's literature ===
- Pendergrast, Mark (2010). Jack and the Bean Soup. Nature's Face Publications. ISBN 978-0982900406.
- Pendergrast, Mark (2013). Silly Sadie. Nature's Face Publications. ISBN 978-0982900451.
- Pendergrast, Mark (2015). The Godfool. Nature's Face Publications. ISBN 978-0982900475.
