= The Return of Sarah's Daughters =

1997 documentary film by Marcia Jarmel

- Directed by: Marcia Jarmel
- Distributed by: PBS
- Release date: 1997
- Country: United States

The Return of Sarah's Daughters is a 1997 documentary film exploring the lives of three American Jewish women and their relationships with Judaism. The documentary was directed by filmmaker Marcia Jarmel and was aired on PBS. The film explores the autobiographical account of a Jewish feminist and her decision to join the Chabad Hasidic community.

== See also ==
- Chabad in film and television
- Kosher Love
- Shekinah Rising
