= Speaking in Tongues (speech) =

Essay by Gloria E. Anzaldúa

Title of Gloria Anzaldúa's speech

Speaking in Tongues: A Letter to 3rd World Women Writers is a letter written by Gloria E. Anzaldúa. The letter was drafted in 1979 and was published in Anzaldúa’s feminist anthology This Bridge Called My Back: Writings by Radical Women of Color (1981). Writing this essay in the format of a letter, Anzaldua urges the reader to “write from the body” and she connects her body to other bodies, creating a community of embodied people. This essay is addressed to women of color as she shows sympathy, encouragement, and words of wisdom towards them. The essay addresses women of color and encourages these women to make their personal, embodied experiences visible in the text. The reader must also allow the text to enter herself, if the reader chooses to enter the text.

== Impact ==
The essay encourages women of color to write and theorize about their lives, and allowing women to think about their race, sex, gender, class realities and histories, and reclaiming their right to write. She also wants women to reclaim themselves since mainstream society has made women of color the ‘other’, and writing takes on that task that which society alienated them from. Anzaldúa even says in her speech that writing keeps her spirit alive and revolt, and writing compensates for what the real world of her time deprives her from. She states that writing allows her to accept who she is and reclaiming that for herself.

Writing introduces at power that when women of color write, it gives them power, and a woman with power is feared. And when women come together and share their writing with one another, a community is created. This community dispels all loneliness and sense of powerlessness, but Anzaldúa explains that it, “…propels [her] to leap into a timeless, spaceless no place where [she] can forget [herself] and feel [she’s] the universe. This is power”. She closes her essay saying to ignore the rules and the ways of society and to allow the voice that lies within yourself to come out and sell it.

Anzaldúa’s speech received responses from people of different sexualities, rape survivors, and people of color. Her speech opened up the eyes of African American and Latina professors who suffered from self-doubt and self-hate caused by racism and sexism. Anzaldúa’s style of writing and speech was used to describe Linda Kerber’s keynote address to the American Studies Association. Kerber addressed the rise of a new disciplinary identity which was founded upon the paradigm of diversity. Her work became the path for those who needed the guidance.
