= Evan Beloff =

Canadian film writer, producer and director

- Born: Montreal, Quebec, Canada
- Occupations: Film director, writer, producer
- Known for: Once a Nazi

Evan Beloff is a Canadian film writer, producer, and director. He is known for his documentary films Bigfoot's Reflection (2007), Daughters of the Voice (2018), and A People's Soundtrack (2019). Many of his films are focused on Jewish people and culture, in particular music.

== Early life and education ==
A Montreal native, Evan Beloff holds a double major in creative writing and theatre. While a student at Concordia University, Beloff was a member of a group of students who called themselves the "Sofar Poets".

== Career ==
=== 1990s ===
In 1998, he and an associate organized Montreal's first Radical Jewish Arts and Performance Festival, which they called Chutzpah. It was inspired by the Radical Jewish Festival in New York. It was held on the McGill University campus and included music, spoken word and a walking tour. After a brief spell in Montreal's underground, Anglo theatre scene, he found work writing and researching IMAX documentaries for renowned producer Pietro Serapiglia.

=== 2000s ===
In 2000–2001, Beloff co-founded the Montreal film house Diversus Productions and served as the Producer and Second Unit Director for the Gemini Award-nominated documentary Too Colorful for the League: A History of Blacks in Hockey for the CBC.

In 2002, he produced, starred in and narrated the festival hit mockumentary Schmelvis: Searching for the King's Jewish Roots (Nodance, HBO Comedy Arts Fest). The film is about a camp Jewish character called Schmelvis created by a Montreal singer-songwriter earth citizen named Dan Hartal. His costume comprises a rhinestone-studded white jumpsuit with a large Star of David wrestling-style belt-buckle and a red star-covered cape.

In 2002 and 2003, Beloff produced, wrote, and directed the 19-part documentary series (two seasons) Women Warriors for WTSN, SCN, CBC, Radio Canada, and CFCF12/CTV. He also produced an episode of Life & Times for CBC on Canadian poet Irving Layton.

In 2003, Beloff co-produced the reality comedy-documentary Cruising Quebec for Global. He produced, co-wrote and co-directed the mockumentary The Legend of Memphre for Space and City TV.

In 2004, he co-produced Being Osama for CBC's Passionate Eye, RDI and Al Arabiya.

His final documentary project at Diversus was an architecture and travel documentary for Global titled Winter Wonderland: The Making of the Ice Hotel. Beloff wrote, directed and produced the film which is distributed by the National Film Board of Canada and broadcast internationally on such channels as: HBO Europe, Spektrum TV RT Hungary, CPS Czech Republic, TVC Spain, NHK Japan and TV2 in France.

In 2005, Beloff relinquished partnership in Diversus Productions to establish his own company, Ontic Media, and has since written, directed and produced (in collaboration with Bunbury Film's, Academy Award-winning producer Frederic Bohbot) the prize-winning, biopic thriller, Once a Nazi on former Waffen SS soldier turned professor Adalbert Lallier for SCN, CTV, Canal D, CLT, American Public Television/PBS and distributed internationally by the National Film Board of Canada. Once a Nazi was awarded the 2006 J. I Segal Award for Canadian, Jewish-Themed Film of the Year.

In 2007, he co-wrote, produced, and directed an update of the Bigfoot/Sasquatch legend titled "Bigfoot's Reflection" for CHUM, City TV, CLT, Space, and SCN.

In 2008, he produced the documentary Quitter le Bercail (Leaving the Fold) by acclaimed director Eric Scott for Radio Canada, Documentary Channel Canada, ABC Australia. It is about two brothers who leave the Montreal Hasidic community.

=== 2010s ===
In 2010, Beloff produced the access documentary Burning Water along with Frederic Bohbot's Bunbury Films for CBC's The Lens. The film is directed by Cameron Esler and Tadzio Richards.

In 2010, Beloff also returned to directing with the documentary Underdog Plaza on Quebec Super Welterweight Boxing Champion Dierry Jean for OMNI Television Canada and PBS' World Compass.

In 2013 he covered the story of eight-year-old Sandra Cantu, who was abducted, sexually assaulted and murdered next to her trailer park home in Tracy, California. Heaven Beside Us (aka The Disappearance of Sandra Cantu) was produced by SLV Films and is distributed by Films Transit International.

On January 25, 2014, Beloff visited Washington, D.C., to document Dierry Jean's IBF Junior welterweight title fight against Lamont Peterson. The events surrounding the fight would become the central narrative to Beloff's boxing sequel on Jean. Underdog Rises premiered in 2015 on Omni Television in Canada.

In October 2016, he partnered again with producer Frederic Bohbot and his company Bunbury Films to write and direct Kosher Love, a feature documentary exploring orthodox and Hassidic relationships in a wired, modern world. Kosher Love premiered on CBC's new documentary strand FIRSTHAND on February 16, 2017. Kosher Love was a finalist for Best Canadian Documentary at the 2018 Canadian Screen Awards, March 11, 2018, in Toronto.

On September 1, 2018, Beloff's film Daughters of the Voice premiered on the CBC film series Absolutely Canadian.

On March 5, 2019, his feature documentary A People's Soundtrack, which explores the rich history of Jewish cantorial music in Montreal, premiered on PBS. A People's Soundtrack had its US theatrical premiere in February 2020 at the Miami Jewish Film Festival.

=== 2020s ===
Beloff again partnered with CBC on his documentary, Just As I Am, a film which explores the founding of a special needs musical group called the Shira Choir, while the COVID-19 pandemic challenged their collective will to stay connected. Just As I Am highlights the power of music as it shatters judgement and celebrates the passion and well-being of those with disabilities. The film had its small screen premiere on September 25, 2021 Just As I Am had its US theatrical premiere in January 2022 at the Miami Jewish Film Festival.

On April 15, 2021, he was commissioned to write and direct a follow-up to his documentary Kosher Love. Meet. Pray. Love: Return of The Love Rabbi premiered September 24, 2022 on CBC. The film had its first US screening at the 26th Annual Miami Jewish Film Festival which took place from January 12–26, 2023.

Beloff began preliminary development on the documentary Rip It Up & Start Again: Jews, The Holocaust & Punk, based on Steven Lee Beeber's influential, multi-biography The Heebie-Jeebies at CBGB's: A Secret History of Jewish Punk.

During the filming of Just As I Am, Evan met autistic artist Benjamin Lachapelle and in February 2024 CBC agreed to license his feature documentary on Ben's art, environmentalism and the story of unpaid caregivers fighting for equal rights in Canada. Ben's Animals was broadcast on June 28, 2025 on CBC. Ben's Animals made its US premiere in New York City during International Autism Month at the Culture Lab LIC in Queens on Saturday, April 4. https://pagesix.com/2026/04/03/entertainment/bens-animals-documentary-to-make-us-premiere-in-nyc/

Beloff subsequently began production on Women of Substance, a documentary about photographer Patricia Schwarz and her portrait series of the same name. The film is being produced for CBC, with Filmoption International handling distribution. https://sodec.gouv.qc.ca/aide-a-la-production-11-documentaires-soutenus-par-la-sodec-2026/?fbclid=IwY2xjawTUa-1leHRuA2FlbQIxMQBicmlkETE1cGJ6RVNwTU9sVjlrOVNvc3J0YwZhcHBfaWQQMjIyMDM5MTc4ODIwMDg5MgABHhUpgUF8Eut2KqmGJRinJxZJqDuoEk7u3e3Ie-WFoHwlYfCEigbfhVR7bGBh_aem_4eURUk-wbqtfYOkX1soKiA

== Awards and honors ==
Beloff is the recipient of a CTV Producer's Fellowship from the 2000 Banff International Television Festival. as well as a Gemini nomination for best sports documentary- Too Colourful for the league: a history of Black hockey players (2001), a JI Segal Award for Canadian Jewish-themed film of the year - Once a Nazi (2006), and a Canadian Screen Award nomination for Best Canadian Documentary - Kosher Love (2018)

== Podcast ==
Beloff hosts a podcast with his doc collaborator Noah Leon. "Let's Not Be Lazy Filmmakers" is available on multiple platforms including Spotify and Acast.

== Personal life ==
Beloff is a strict vegetarian.

== Credits ==
=== Plays ===
- The Wait, produced by Vilna Players (1997)
- Never, by Rightime Productions
- Natural Times, produced by the OK Theatre

=== Films ===
- Too Colorful for the League: A History of Blacks in Hockey (2001)
- A Red Carpet for the Sun: The Life & Times of Irving Layton (2002)
- Schmelvis: Searching for the King's Jewish Roots (2002)
- Winter Wonderland: Making of the Ice Hotel (2003)
- Being Osama (2004)
- Cruising Quebec (2004)
- The Legend of Memphre (2004)
- Once a Nazi... (Nazi un Jour...) (2006)
- Bigfoot's Reflection (2007)
- Quitter le Bercail (Leaving the Fold) (2008)
- Burning Water (2010)
- Underdog Plaza (2011)
- Heaven Beside Us (aka The Disappearance of Sandra Cantu) (2013)
- Underdog Rises (2015)
- Kosher Love (2017)
- Daughters of the Voice (2018)
- A People's Soundtrack (2019)
- Just As I Am: The Shira Choir (2021)
- Meet Pray Love: Return of The Love Rabbi (2022)
- Ben's Animals (2025)
- Women Of Substance: The Legacy Of Patricia Schwarz (2027)

== Television ==
- Life & Times: Irving Layton (2002)
- Women Warriors (2002–2003)

== Music videos ==
- La Vie est Laide (1998)
