= Marcia Jarmel =

American director and producer

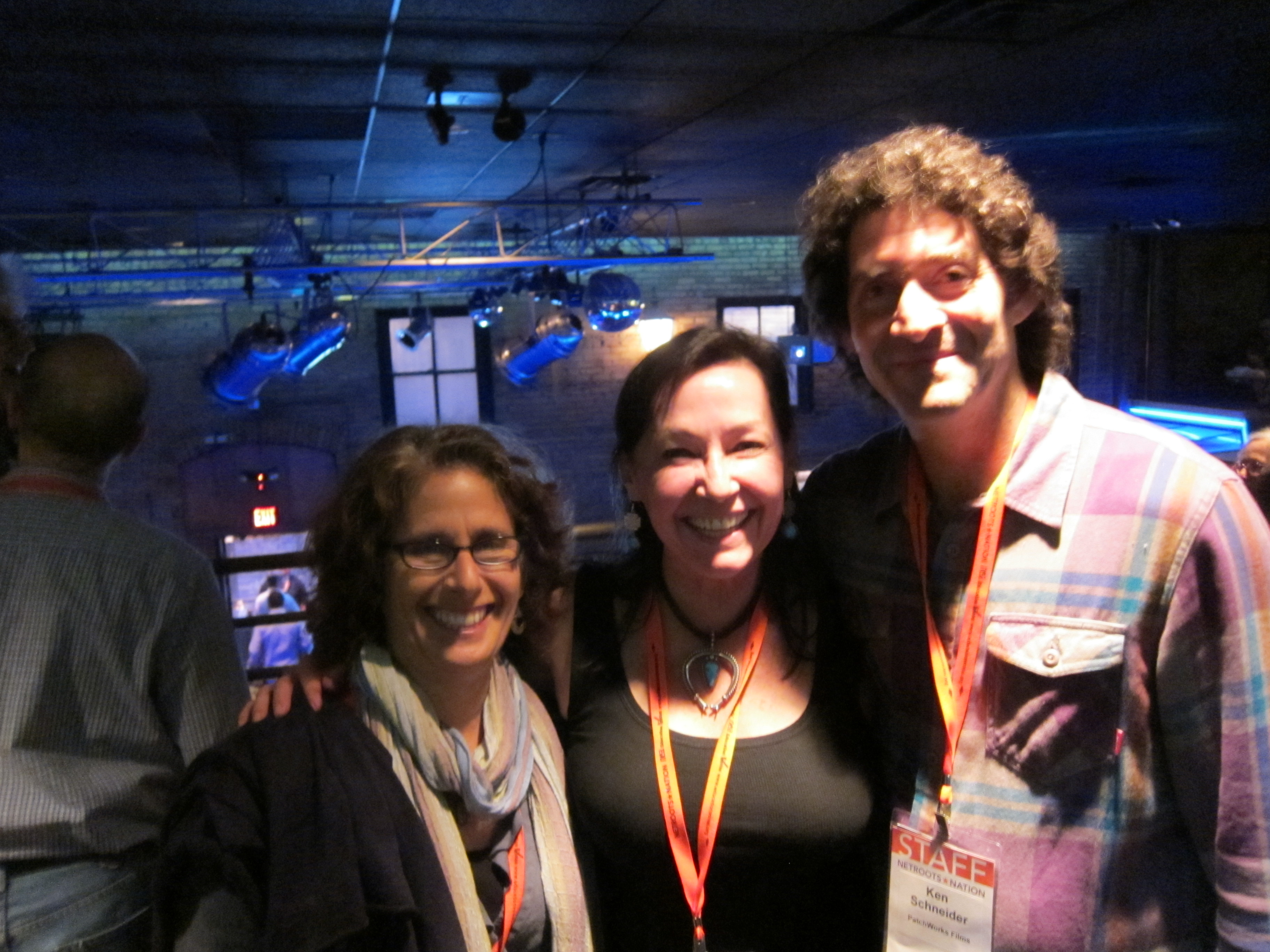
Jarmel (on left) in 2011

Marcia Jarmel is a director, producer, and long-standing member of the Bay Area documentary community. She was born and raised in suburban New Jersey and attended high school and college in Boulder, Colorado, where she studied journalism. She learned filmmaking through hands-on experience working on others people's projects. She moved to the Bay Area in 1988 and six years later, co-founded the San Francisco-based production company, PatchWorks Films, with husband-collaborator Ken Schneider. She has directed, produced, and managed impact for their films ever since.

== Filmography ==
Year	Title	Role
1990	Berkeley in the Sixties (documentary)	Assistant producer
1997	The Return of Sarah's Daughters (documentary)	Director, screenwriter, producer
2000	Born in the U.S.A. (documentary)	Director, producer
2009	Speaking in Tongues (documentary)	Director, producer
2013	50 Children: The Rescue Mission of Mr. and Mrs. Kraus (documentary)	Consulting producer
2013	Open the Classroom Door (documentary short)	Director
2014	Havana Curveball (documentary)	Director, producer
2016	The Wheel of Life (documentary short)	Director, producer
2019	It's Only Rock n' Roll (documentary short)	Director, producer
2021	What You'll Remember (documentary short)	Producer
2021	Los Hermanos/The Brothers (documentary)	Director, producer

== Awards and fellowships ==
Marcia Jarmel has been honored with residencies with BAVC Media Maker, Working Films, SFFilmm, and Kopkind Colony. Her films have broadcast on PBS and won numerous awards in the festival circuit. She most recently co-directed and co-produced, Los Hermanos/The Brothers, which won Best Documentary at the WoodStock Film Festival and was nominated for an Imagen Award.
