= Speaking in Tongues (2009 film) =

2009 documentary film

Speaking in Tongues is a 2009 documentary film that focuses on the language barrier within society. Spanning 60 minutes this documentary is programmed by California Visions. It included languages of English, Mandarin, Cantonese and Spanish. Directed by Marcia Jarmel and Ken Schneider it was released April 2009 in the United States but has languages such as English, Mandarin, Cantonese, and Spanish.

The documentary spans inside American Immersion school systems. This film illustrates Americans in the 21st Century and the growth of bilingualism.

Speaking in Tongues begins in a public kindergarten classroom made up of white students and Asian American students. What is different about this traditional American classroom is the teacher only speaks Mandarin, Cantonese, or Spanish to her students. Because these children are so young they are not becoming frustrated by the language barrier instead they are interested and fascinated by something they are not used to. This process takes time but teaches the children to remember and focus on signals and speech repetition to eventually comprehend what language is being taught to them. By only hearing a language they are not accustomed to, they have no opportunity to confide in English, their first language. The ideal time to become bilingual is before the age of 13. Within the film, every student was immersed before this age. Learning more than one language benefits the brain by increasing the flexibility of one's brain.

Immersion, which also called Language immersion is known as teaching a new language to a group of students solely through that language. Language Immersion is currently being used across the United States but has yet been shown on films other than "Speaking in Tongues".

== Plot ==
This concept of Immersion is used within Speaking Tongues by following the four main characters. Durrell, Kelly, Jason, and Julian. Durrell, an African American kindergartener, is attending a Mandarin Immersion school where he is surrounded by his peers who can read and write Chinese. His mother thinks this will be a benefit for Durrell due to the injustice for African American males growing up in this country. Within the film, Durrell is able to order a meal using strictly Mandarin. Julian, a Caucasian 8th grader where immersion has brought him to excel in Chinese within school and eventually travel to China. He began studying immersion 9 years prior to 8th grade. Kelly is Asian American and attends a Cantonese Immersion School. She originally spoke no Chinese prior to this schooling. Kelly’s mom was only able to speak minimal words in Chinese while growing up, the same with her father. Jason does not focus on Chinese but instead the bilingualism of being a Mexican American immigrant, he attends an English/Spanish Immersion school where he is expected to speak and work on both languages. The film's journey examines all four students and how immersion affected and impacted their lives and futures.

While parts of the documentary show these young students excelling in learning a second language, Speaking Tongues also explores the side of being in America that necessitates needing English instead of a second language. Ling- chi Wang an Asian American Professor from the University of California Berkeley appears in the film to advocate bilingualism and immersion instead of keeping the United States monolinguals. Wang explains that this country is in need of more bilingualism than monolinguals due to the wide array of races within this country. He proposes the idea that within San Francisco every school system should teach another language. Within the film, videos are shown of current Americans that feel as though people are fine just knowing English within America. But due to the changing of people living within the country, times are changing and so are people.

== Reception ==
It was awarded “2009 San Francisco International Film Festival-Audience Award Best Documentary Feature”. This is the only film globally that has documented immersion programs within school systems. Speaking in Tongues was shown at The Central Arts Festival in Pennsylvania and hosted by Penn State in July 2015.

== Directors ==
PatchWork Films created in 1994 by Marcia Jarmel and Ken Schneider. Marcia Jarmel is known for work such as Born in the USA, Collateral Damage, Return of Sarah’s Daughter, and The F Word. Ken Schneider is known for work such as Regret to Inform which was nominated for an Academy Award, also Boliano 52, An American Journey, and The Good War (San Joaquin Film Society). Ken Schneider and Marcia Jarmel spoke on camera discussing the making on Speaking in Tongues. They spoke on the emphasis of America being a monolingual (English) and that only speaking one language is barricading people as far as to different countries but also within their own streets. Speaking in Tongues was produced in 2006 and 2007 to later be published in 2009.
