= Abbey Jack Neidik =

Canadian film director (born 1947)

Abbey Jack Neidik (born 1947 in Montreal) is a Canadian film director, producer, writer, picture editor, sound editor and cinematographer. He is known for socially engaged films about issues from human rights and cultural identity to mental health and international relations. He has directed, produced, and edited over 70 films, including works that have been recognized with major international awards, broadcasts and screenings. Neidik and his partner Irene Angelico co-founded DLI Productions, a documentary production company based in Montreal.

== Career ==
In 1980, Neidik co-produced and directed Dark Lullabies about the effects of the Holocaust on the next generations of Jews and Germans. Dark Lullabies was the inaugural film at the Stratford Festival Forum, screened at the Berlin Arsenal 70th anniversary of the Holocaust, the Inconvenient Films: International Human Rights Festival in Vilnius, and was selected as one of the 250 greatest films of all times at the National Film Board of Canada’s Salute to the Documentary. .

Neidik next directed Between The Solitudes/Entre Solitudes, about the Anglo community in Quebec., followed by The Love Prophet and the Children of God, a look at a controversial religious cult. A Song for Tibet about Tibetans in exile; The Cola Conquest, produced by Neidik, is a three-part series about Coca-Cola as a metaphor for American influence worldwide. Neidik co-produced and directed The Journey Home: A Romanian Adoption, a film about Romanian orphans a decade after the fall of Ceausescu. He co-produced and co-directed She Got Game, a behind-the-scenes look at women’s tennis; Vendetta Song, which examines the tradition of honour killings in rural Kurdish tribes in Turkey; co-produced and directed Unbreakable Minds, which aims to de-stigmatize mental illness; co-produced and co-directed Inside the Great Magazines, a three-part series about the inner workings of the magazine industry; and co-produced and directed Canadaville, USA, about billionaire Frank Stronach's social experiment in rural Louisiana.

In 2013, Neidik co-produced and directed Beyond Earth: the Beginning of NewSpace; Shekinah: the Intimate Lives of Hasidic Women; in 2015 Big Wind, about the effects of industrial wind turbines; and, in 2018, the sequel Shekinah Rising.

Most recently, Neidik co-directed, wrote and produced First to Stand: The Cases and Causes of Irwin Cotler, a documentary about former Attorney General and Minister of Justice of Canada and international human rights lawyer, Irwin Cotler and the Raoul Wallenberg Centre for Human Rights. The film premiered on Human Rights Day, December 10, 2022 at the Cinéma du Musée in Montreal, Quebec. The film was screened for the U.S. Congress on the occasion of Cotler receiving the Lantos Human Rights Award.

== Books ==
Neidik was co-editor in the publication of The Aftermath: A Survivor's Odyssey Through War-Torn Europe.

== Awards ==
First to Stand (2022)

Producer, Director, Cinematographer

Nominee. Barcelona Indie Awards, 2025.Awards:

Honorable Mention. Los Angeles Film and Documentary Awards. 2024.

Best Feature Length Documentary, Goldstar Movie Awards, 2023.

Honorable Mention, Mannheim Arts and Film Festival, 2023.

Nominee, Festival des Libertés (Brussels), 2023.

Beyond Earth: the Beginning of NewSpace (2016)

Producer, Director, Editor, Writer, Cinematographer

Award Winner - Hollywood Independent Documentary Awards (2017)

Jury’s Special Mention - Beyond Earth Film Festival (2019)

Shekinah: The Intimate Life of Hasidic Women (2013)

Producer, Director, Editor, Writer, Cinematographer

Best Documentary - Crown Heights Film Festival, New York (2013)

Canadaville, USA (2008)

Producer, Director, Editor, Writer, Cinematographer

Merit Prize for Social Political Documentary - Hugo Television Awards Chicago Film Festival (2008)

Vendetta Song (2005)

Producer

Best Canadian Documentary on International Development – Hot Docs (2005)

Top Ten Audience Favourites - Hot Docs (2005)

Best Canadian Documentary - Calgary International Festival (2005)

Best Medium Length Documentary, Québécois, Quebec Film Critics Association - Rendez-vous du Cinéma Québécois (2005)

People’s Choice Award - Rendez-vous du Cinéma Québécois (2005)

Best Documentary Award - Female Eye Film Festival (2005)

Bronze Plaque, Humanities – Columbus International Film and Video Festival (2006)

3rd prize - International Women’s Film Festival, Torino (2006)

She Got Game (2003)

Producer, Director, Cinematographer

Aurora Awards - Gold Awards (2004)

Guirlande d'Honneur - Sports Movies & TV Int. Festival, Milan (2003)

Best Documentary - Temecula Valley Int. Film and Music Festival (2003)

Chris Statuette – Columbus International Film Festival (2003)

The Cola Conquest; A Trilogy (1998)

Producer

Best Documentary Series by an Independent - Hot Docs )1999)

Gold Apple - National Education Media Network (1999)

Silver Hugo - Chicago international Television Competition (1999)

Best Writing in a Documentary or Series - Gemini Awards (1999)

Best Documentary Series Nominee - Gemini Awards (1999)

Encounter Internacionais de Cinema Documentale, Vila Franca de Xira (1998)

The Love Prophet and the Children of God (1998)

Producer, Director, Editor, Writer

Gold Plaque, Best Biography of the Year - Chicago International Television Competition, (1998)

Golden Sheaf Award - Yorktown Short Film and Video Festival (1999)

Best Biography Nominee - Hot Docs (1999)

A Song For Tibet (1993)

Producer

Best Short Documentary - Genie Awards (1992)

Best Documentary of the Year - Yorkton Film Festival(1992)

People’s Choice, Best Documentary Film – Hawaii Film Festival (1992)

Blue Ribbon - American Film Festival (1992)

Entre Solitudes / Between the Solitudes (1992)

Producer, Director, Editor

Best Documentary Nomination - Les Prix Gémeaux (1993)

Best Editing Nomination - Les Prix Gémeaux (1993)

Diplôme de participation – FIPA at Cannes, Les Grands Reportages Faits de Societé (1994)

Certificate of Appreciation - Earth Peace International Festival (1983)

Falling Over Backwards (1990)

Sound Editor

Best Sound Editing - Genie Nomination (1991)

Dark Lullabies / Berceuse pour des Ombres (1985)

Producer, Director, Editor

Special Prize, Most Socially, Politically Engaging Film, International Film Festival of Mannheim (1985)

First Prize, Interfilm Jury Award - International film Festival of Mannheim (1985)

Educational Jury Award, International film Festival of Mannheim (1985)

Most Memorable Film - World Television Festival, Tokyo (1986)

Red Ribbon - American Film Festival (1986)

Best Feature Film Nominee - Torino International Festival of Young Cinema, Prize of the City of Torino (1986)

Selected, “The 250 Best Ever Documentaries from Around the World) NFB's "Salute to the Documentary (1989)

Volcano: An Inquiry into the Life and Death of Malcolm Lowry (1976) Sound Editor

Canadian Film Awards, Etrog - Best Sound Editing (1976)

Academy Award – Best Documentary Nomination (1977)

== See also ==
- List of Holocaust films
- Space's Deepest Secrets
- Yisroel Bernath
- Mark Pendergrast
- 14th Gemini Awards
